= Valencian Figurita =

Breed of pigeon

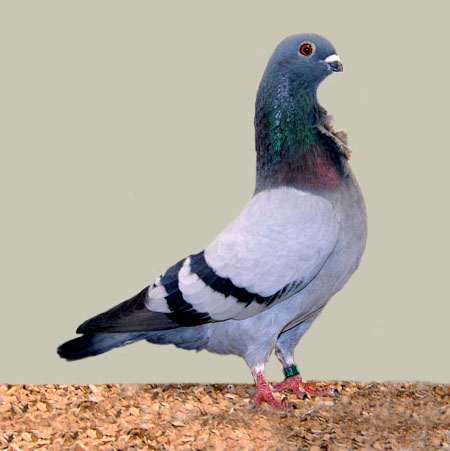
- Figurita Blue bar
- Conservation status: Common
- Other names: Figurita
- Distribution: Europe, US
- Type: Show

Traits
- Weight: Male: 9 oz; Female: 8 oz
- Crest type: None
- Feather ornamentation: Jabot
- Color: black, blue, silver, red, yellow, grizzle
- Lifespan: 12 years

Classification

Notes
- One of the smallest pigeon breeds

The Valencian Figurita is a breed of fancy pigeon developed over many years of selective breeding. It originated in Valencia, Spain hundreds of years ago and is the smallest (4-6 ounces) of the many fancy pigeon breeds. The breed is promoted by the Valencian Figurita and Italian Owl Club in the United States, by the Figurita Club Nederland in the Netherlands, and by the Figurita-Movchen-Club Deutschland in Germany. Valencian Figuritas are bred in the colors black, red, yellow, silver, blue, white, dun, ash-red, and blue and red grizzle. It also appears in the patterns bar, check, and spread.

Valencian Figuritas, along with other varieties of domesticated pigeons, are all descendants of the rock pigeon (Columba livia). The Figurita is known for its small size, angular-shaped head, frilled chest feathers, and perky disposition.

== Origin ==
This ancient breed originated in Valencia, Spain.

== Gallery ==
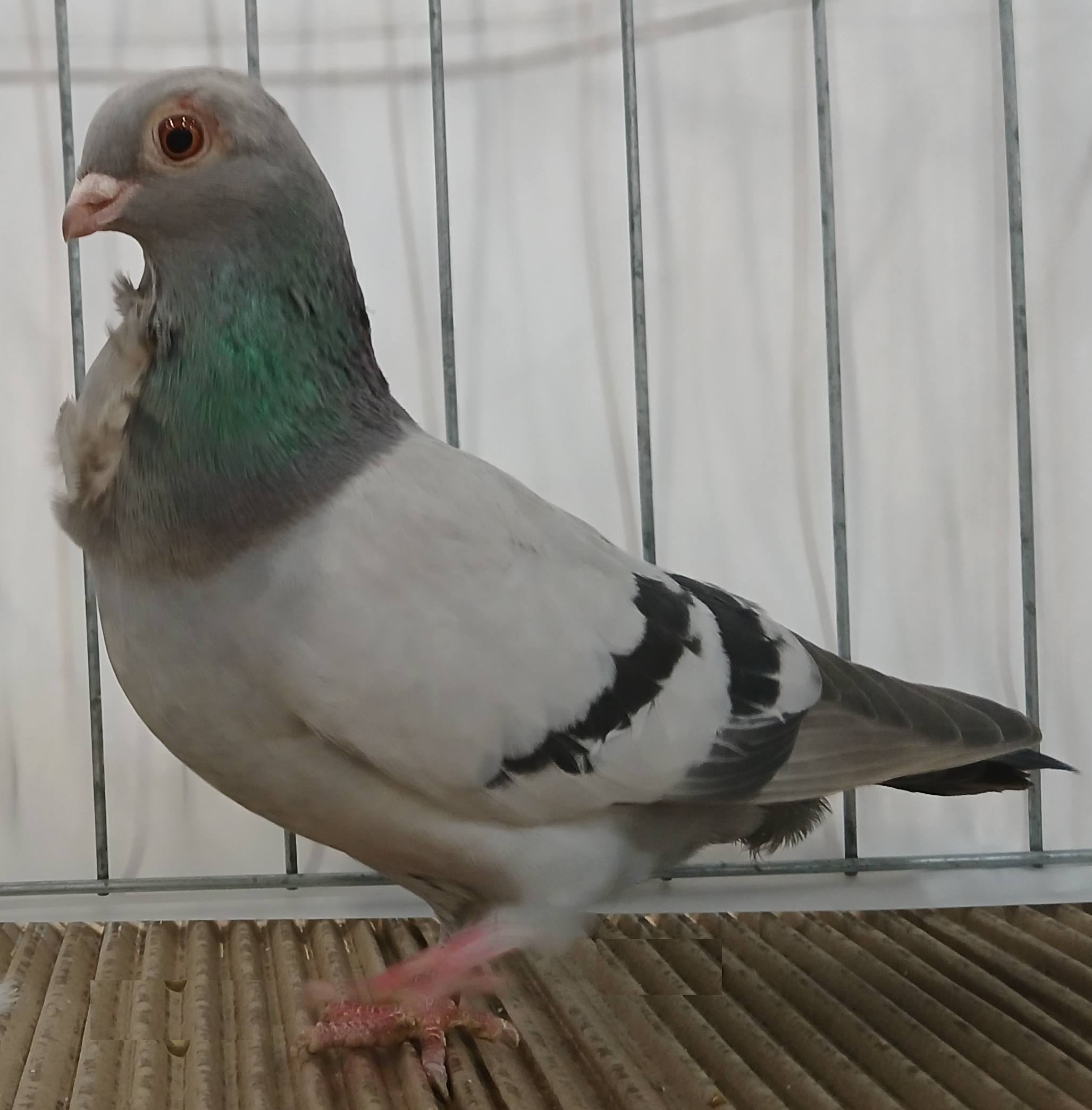
Blue bar

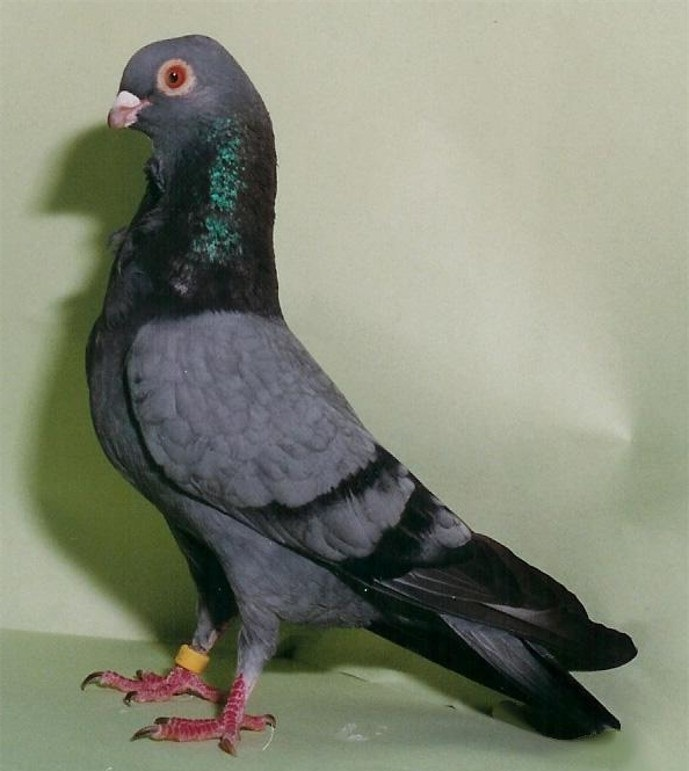
Dusty blue bar

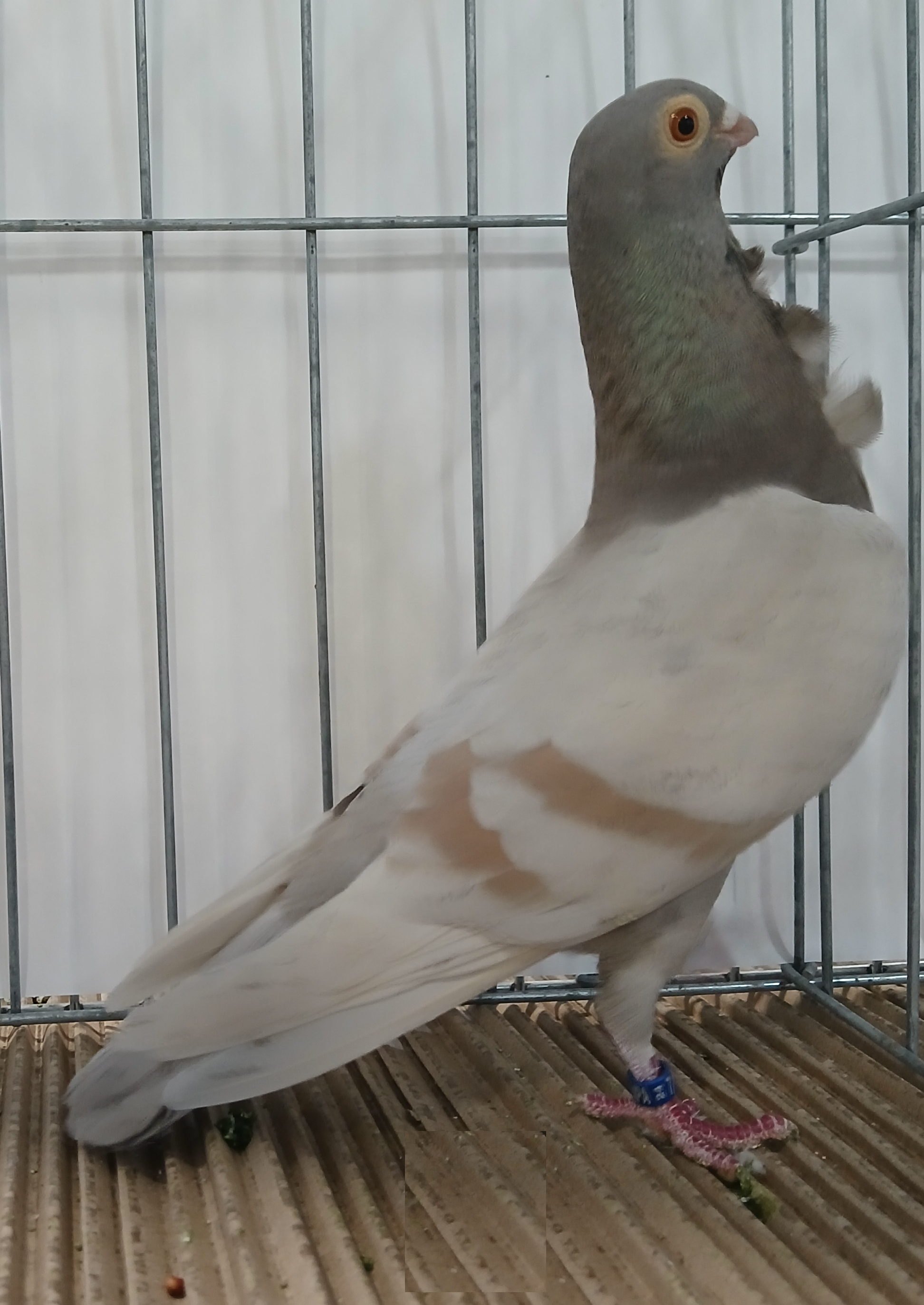
Cream bar

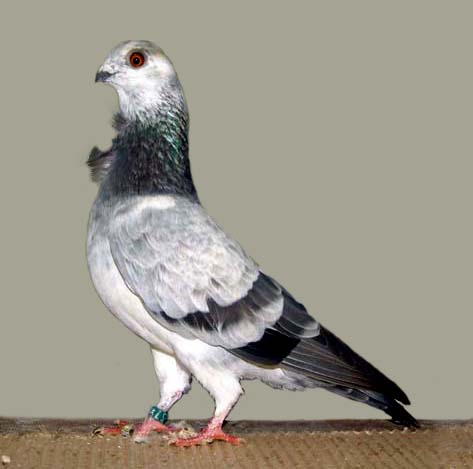
Blue grizzle

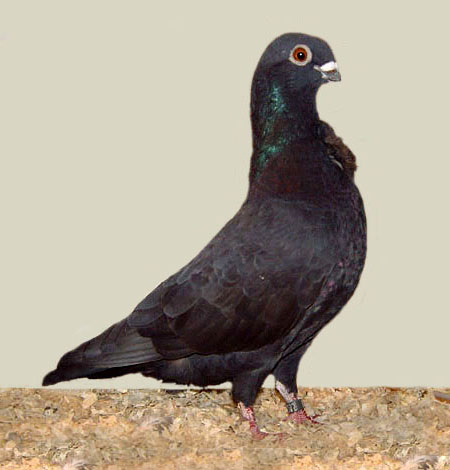
Black

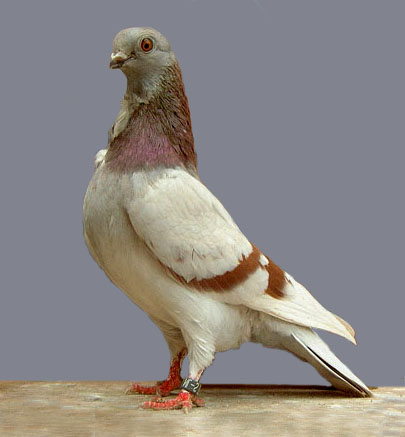
Red bar

== See also ==
- Pigeon Diet
- Pigeon Housing
- List of pigeon breeds
