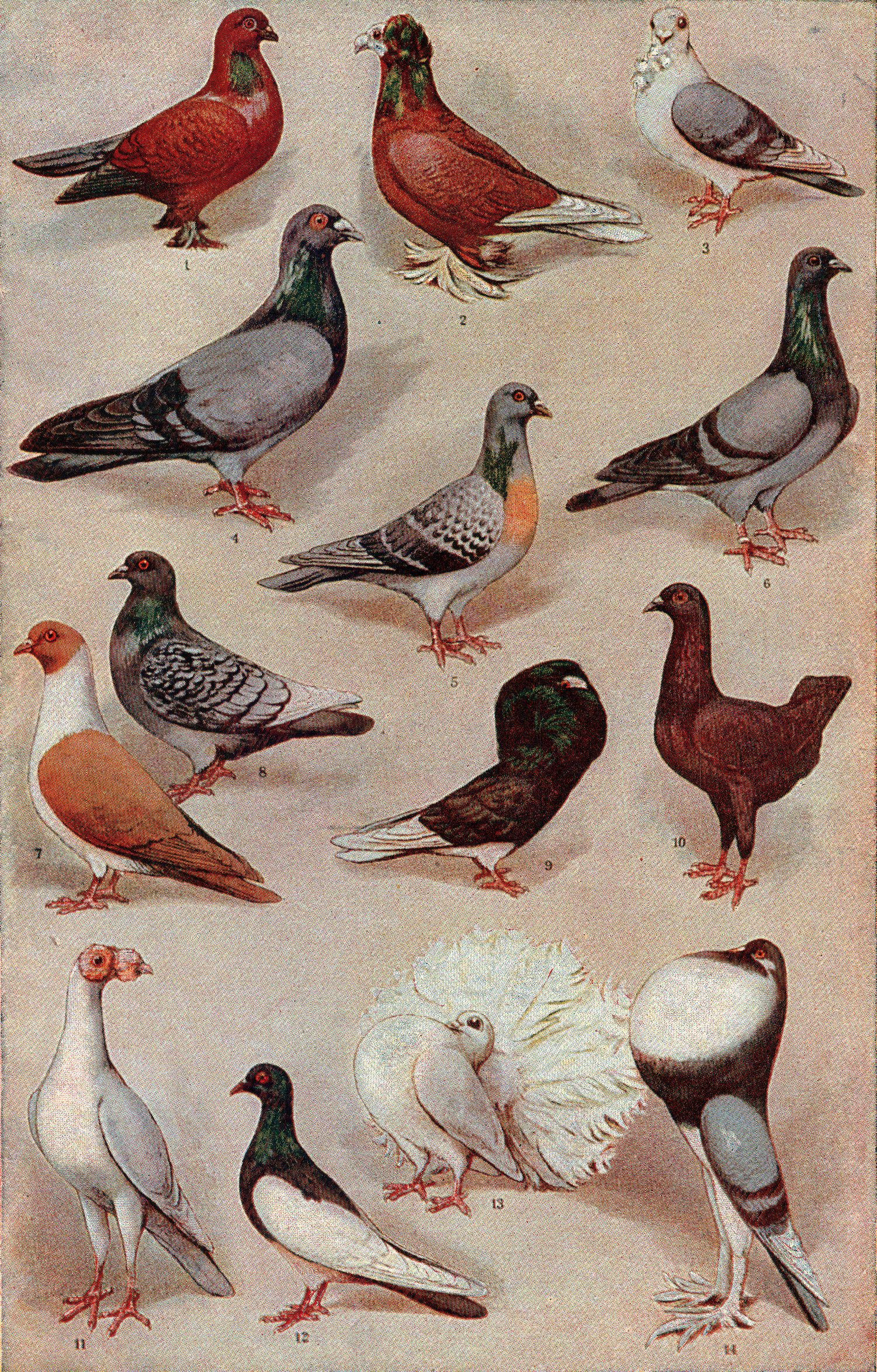
- A selection of domestic pigeon breeds and colors, the result of centuries of selective breeding (Note: Breeds depicted are: Middle-billed Tumbler; German Drum; Anatolian Turbit; Roman; Coburg Lark; Antwerp Carrier; Strasser; Lynx; Nun; Maltese; Carrier; Long-billed Tumbler; Fantail; English Pouter)

Conservation status
- Domesticated

Scientific classification
- Kingdom: Animalia
- Phylum: Chordata
- Class: Aves
- Order: Columbiformes
- Family: Columbidae
- Genus: Columba
- Species: C. livia
- Subspecies: C. l. domestica

Trinomial name
- Columba livia domestica Gmelin, 1789

Synonyms
- Columba domestica; Columba livia rustica

= Domestic pigeon =

Small domesticated bird

The domestic pigeon (Columba livia "domestica" or Columba livia forma domestica) is a domesticated bird derived from the rock dove (Columba livia), of which it is also a subspecies. Although often termed a "subspecies", the domesticated pigeon does not constitute an accepted zoological subspecies of the rock dove, but a collection of over 350 breeds. The rock dove is among the world's first birds to be domesticated; Mesopotamian cuneiform tablets mention the domestication of pigeons more than 5,000 years ago, as do Egyptian hieroglyphs.

Pigeons have held historical importance to humans as food, pets, symbolic animals, and messengers. Due to their homing ability, pigeons have been used to deliver messages, including war pigeons during the two world wars. City pigeons, which are feral birds, are generally seen as pests, mainly due to their droppings and a reputation for spreading disease.

== History of domestication ==
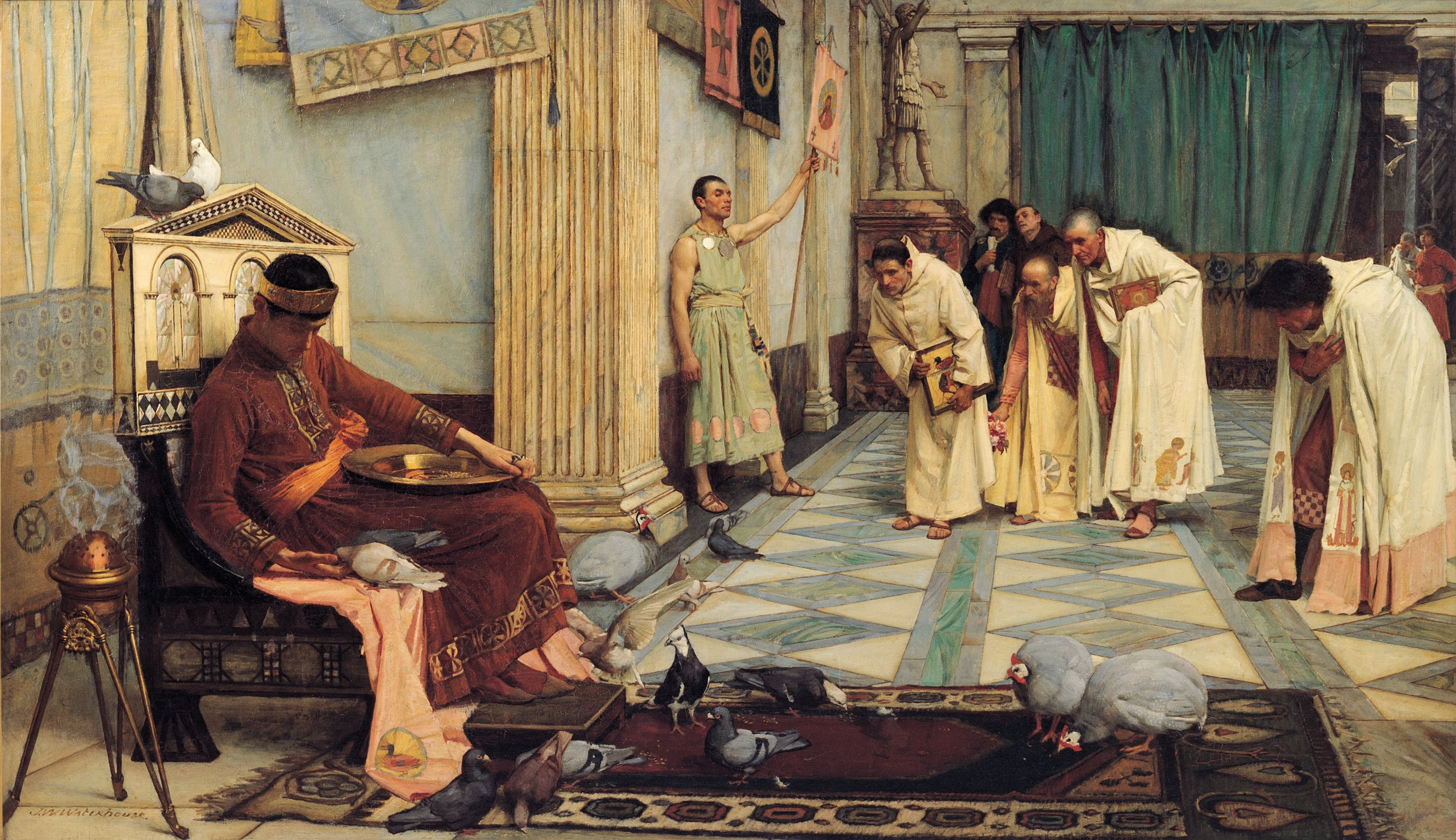
Emperor Honorius is a historically prominent individual who kept pigeons as pets.

Which subspecies of C. livia was the progenitor of domestics, exactly when, how many times, where and how they were domesticated, and how they spread, remains poorly known; despite the long history of pigeons, little is known about the specifics of their initial domestication. Genetically, domesticated pigeons are closest to a cluster of origins of rock dove in the Middle East, particularly in the Syria – Jordan – Iraq – Arabian Peninsula region but also eastern Sudan, thus encompassing all or parts of the ranges of C. l. gaddi, C. l. palaestinae, and C. l. butleri.

Their fragile bones and similarity to wild birds make the fossil record a poor tool for their study. Thus most of what is known comes from written accounts, which almost certainly do not cover the first stages of domestication.

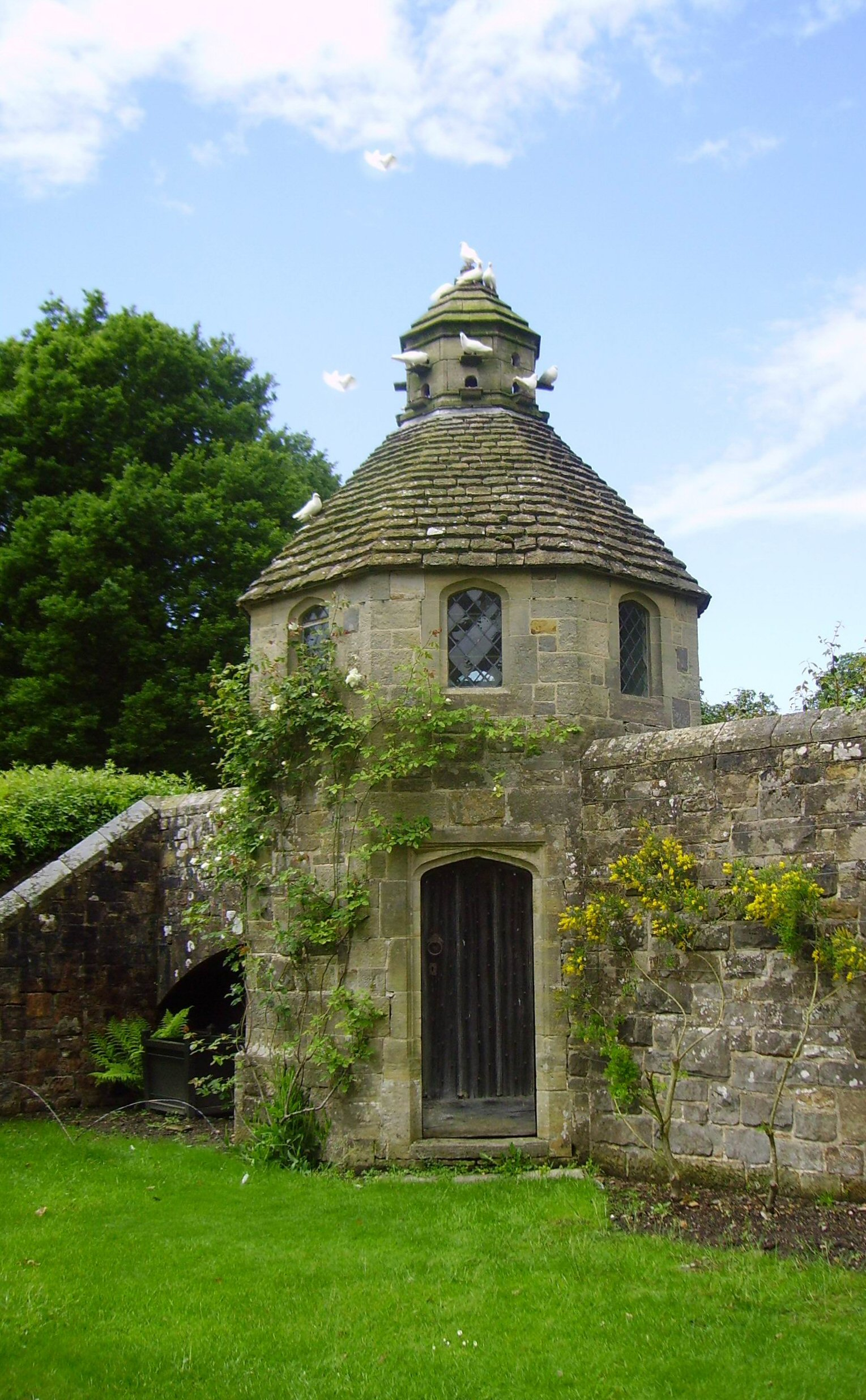
Dovecote at Nymans Gardens, West Sussex, England

Pigeons were most likely domesticated at least 2000–5000 years ago, and may have been domesticated earlier as a food source. Some research suggests that domestication occurred as early as 10,000 years ago. The earliest recorded mention of pigeons comes from Mesopotamia some 5,000 years ago. Pigeon Valley in Cappadocia has rock formations that were carved into ancient dovecotes. Ancient Egyptians kept them. Akbar the Great traveled with a coterie of thousands of pigeons.

Because domestic and feral pigeons have extensively interbred with wild rock doves, genetically pure wild-type rock doves are now rare and endangered, confined to remote regions such as the oceanic fringes of the species' natural range, in particular the Outer Hebrides off western Scotland. This frequent admixture further muddies the true origins of pigeons.

The domestic pigeon was brought to the Americas by European colonists as an easy source of food and as messengers. Some sources state the species was first introduced to North America in 1606 at Port Royal, Nova Scotia, although other sources cite Plymouth and Jamestown settlements in the early 17th century as the first place for species introduction in North America.

Around the 18th century, European interest in fancy pigeons began, and breeders there greatly expanded the variety of pigeons, importing birds from the Middle East and South Asia and mixing different breeds to create new ones. Among these European fanciers was Charles Darwin, who was famously requested to write a book on pigeons during the process of writing On the Origin of Species. His own experiences with pigeon fancying would ultimately lead to another book; The Variation of Animals and Plants Under Domestication.

== Genetics ==
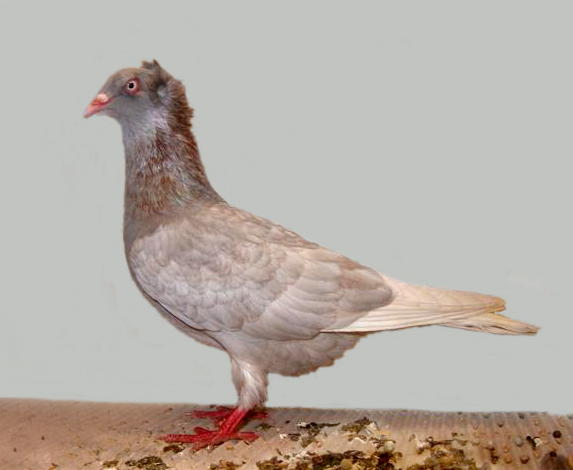
A Spread Ash Pomeranian show crest pigeon, showing one of the forms of feather crest that pigeons may possess

From a genetic perspective, there are two loose ancestral clades of pigeons, but there is striking genetic homogeneity due to frequent interbreeding and human directed cross-breeding; pigeon fanciers often do not enforce breed standards, unlike with dogs. The first ancestral clade contains pigeons with exaggerated crops, tails, and manes; the second contains tumblers (the most diverse group), homing pigeons, owl pigeons, and those with exaggerated wattles. Over the millennia of human interaction with pigeons, a multitude of pigeon breeds have been created, which differ in either plumage or body structure.

Some varieties of domestic pigeon have modified feathers called "fat quills". These feathers contain yellow, oil-like fat that derives from the same cells as powder down. This is used while preening and helps reduce bacterial degradation of feathers by feather bacilli.

=== Markings ===
A "wild-type" pigeon is closest in markings to the rock dove, which possesses a grading, slate-grey head and body with a green-purple iridescent neck, and ash-grey wings and tail with dark, often black, barring. They also differ structurally, with a thicker bill, a larger cere at the base of the bill compared to wild birds, a more flattened (less rounded) head profile, and a paler eye-ring. Due to millennia of selective breeding, including crossing with other Columba species, domestic pigeons possess major variations in plumage; often two birds from the same clutch may be of different colour. The domestic pigeon possesses 3 main colours; the wild-type blue, brown, and ash-red. This variation in colour is linked to the parent's sex chromosomes; as animals with the ZW chromosome system, cockbirds possess the colour genes from both parents, while hens only inherit their father's colour and patterns. Additionally, there is some dominance observed; ash-red is dominant over the other two base colours, while blue is dominant over brown. Recessive red is a unique colour which is inherited differently from the three base ones; it is distinct from ash-red in that the bird always is a uniform chestnut colour.

Another important aspect of pigeon markings is the pattern on the wing coverts, which exists in four variants; wild-type bar, check, T-check, and barless. T-check is the most dominant pattern, followed by check, barred, and the least dominant barless pattern. Additionally, the modifiers spread and dilute affects the expression of the colour; the spread gene spreads the colour of the bird's tail to its entire body, while dilute lightens the bird's overall colour, as if were a dye being diluted to reduce its saturation.

There are many other markings present in pigeons; among them are milky, almond, opal, dirty, indigo, grizzle, and various "stencil" and "bronzing" factors; all of which further modify the base markings of a bird. Conversely, pigeons possess multiple genetic pathways that can produce a completely white bird.

=== Crest ===
A recessive allele in the EphB2 gene controls the crested-feather mutation in domestic pigeons. Pigeons with two copies of the crest allele grow neck and head feathers that point towards the top of the head, unlike other feathers that point towards the tail. Additionally, bacterial growth analysis suggests that crested pigeons have reduced bacterial-killing abilities due to reduced kinase activity. Pigeons may express the crest gene differently depending on its genetic heritage; two squabs from the same brood descending from the same pair may have one bird develop a peak crest, and the other a wild-type smooth head.

=== Foot feathering ===
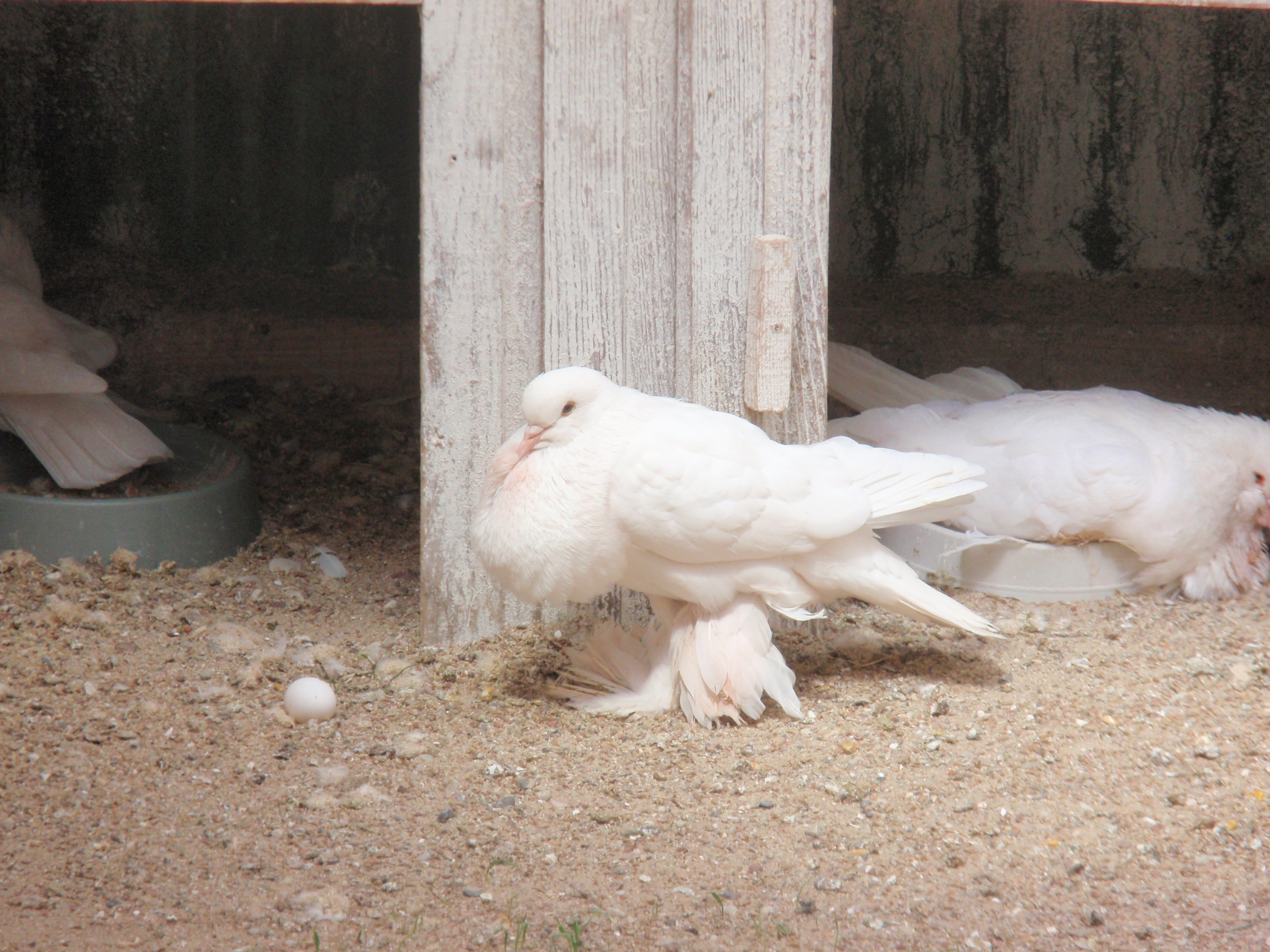
White Cropper pigeon with feathered feet

Pigeons with feathers growing on their feet have differently expressed genes: a hindlimb-development gene called PITX1 is less active than normal, and a forelimb-development gene called Tbx5 that normally develops the wings is also active in the feet, causing both feather growth and larger leg bones. The cause of these changes is a change in the regulatory sequences of DNA that control the expression of the Pitx1 and the Tbx5 genes, rather than mutations in the genes themselves. Pigeon foot feathering has been studied as a potential model for the transition from feathered to "scaled" feet in non-avian dinosaurs. It is thought that large feathers, especially flight feathers on the feet were lost in all living birds as it was too inefficient in powered flight. Domestic pigeons quickly overheated when flying with their scaled feet covered, and it is thought that the loss of microraptorian-like hind-wings allowed for more efficient powered flight.

=== Crop inflation ===
Pouter- or cropper breeds exhibit the trait of inflating their crops with air, producing their signature "globe". This trait is inheritable and partially dominant, though cockbirds tend to exhibit this trait more than females. Some cropper breeds may have issues with passing food and water through their crops, though this problem isn't universal and can be treated by owners.

=== Hybridisation ===
There is strong evidence that some divergences in appearance between the wild-type rock dove and domestic pigeons, such as checkered wing patterns and red/brown colour, may be due to introgression by cross-breeding with the speckled pigeon C. guinea. However, there is little evidence of this in their genetic structure, with C. guinea instead being sister to the common wood pigeon C. palumbus.

Domestic pigeons may be crossed with the barbary dove (Streptopelia risoria) to create offspring, but the offspring are not fertile.

== Life history ==
=== Reproduction ===
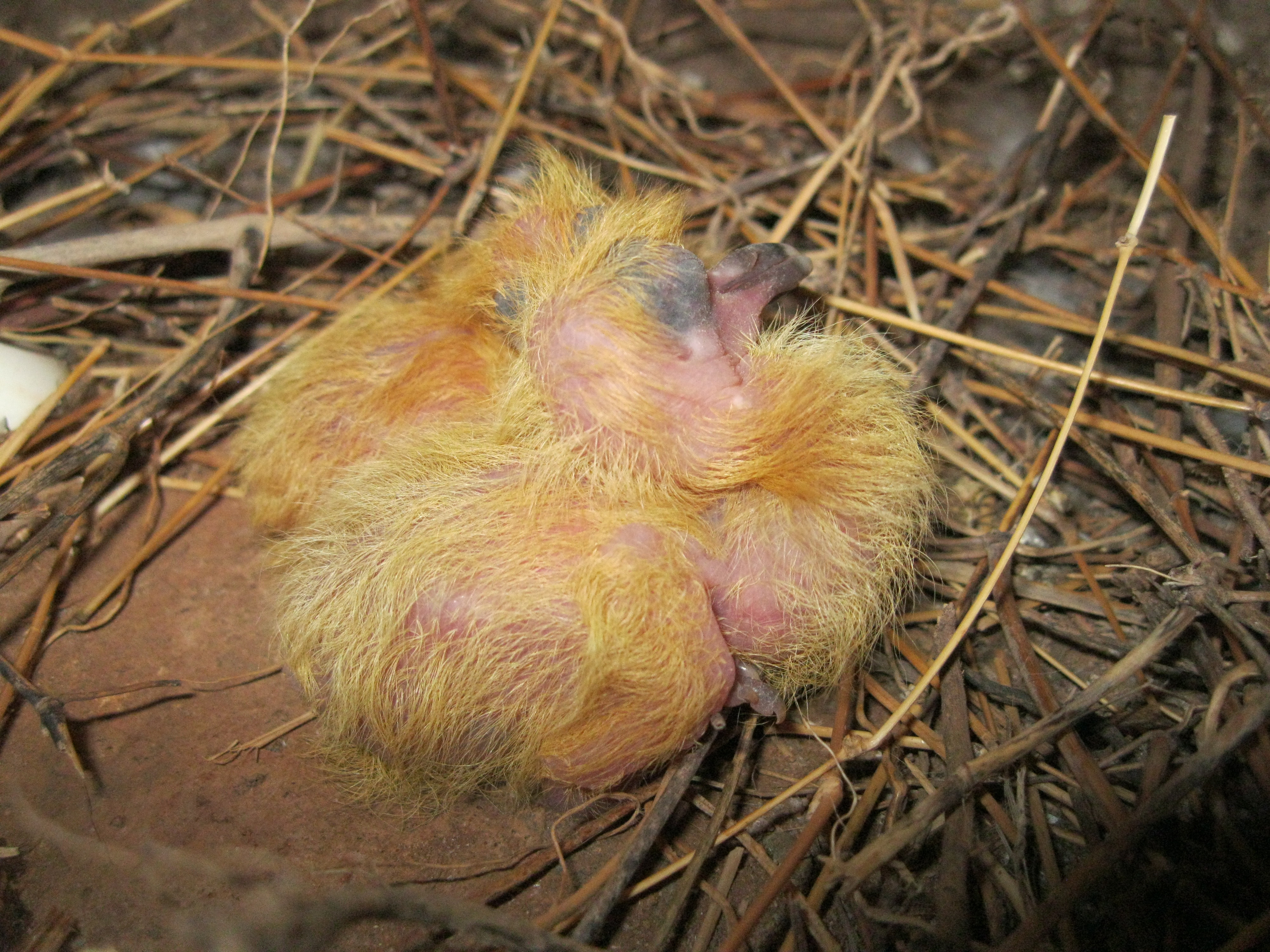
Two very young pigeon chicks, perhaps a few hours old. Domestic pigeons hatch out blind, immobile, and covered in down.

Domestic pigeons reproduce exactly as wild rock doves do; settling in a safe, cool nook, building a flimsy stick nest, and laying two eggs that are incubated for a little longer than two weeks, usually 17 to 19 days. A pigeon keeper may select breeding partners, but in an open loft the birds choose their own mate. Both sexes of pigeons are extremely protective of their eggs and young, and often defend them vigorously from nest predators, including their human keepers; they are defensive of their personal space, and see their nests as extensions of said space.

Baby pigeons are called squabs, squeakers, or peepers, the latter two being a reference to their cry when begging for food. Initially, the squabs are fed by their parents with crop milk, which contains high amounts of protein and fat, some breeds are bred into such debilitating forms that they may require human intervention to produce squabs successfully, which necessitates the owner to raise them themselves by feeding the chicks with special squab formula (similar to infant formula) or by fostering them under another pair of pigeons. This may also be necessary if the parents are unable or unwilling to raise the squab. When fed by their parents, the squabs develop much faster than other species of poultry, such as quail, and fostering in human care may be more effective than using a surrogate pair of pigeons.

As the chicks grow and become more mobile and alert, their parents transition them to their adult food of seeds and grains. A pigeon hen may start a new clutch before her previous one has fledged, in which case her mate raises the previous clutch on his own. Pigeons reach their adult size around four weeks of age, and after fledging the chicks will follow their parents to the communal feeding ground; areas with plentiful forage that a pigeon flock uses. Here the chicks gain their independence and integrate into pigeon society.

Domestic pigeons were selected to breed faster than their wild ancestors; a lack of a breeding season, abundance of food in a domestic setting, and swift maturity (squabs fledge in about a month, and often have already bred and fledged a few clutches of their own before reaching a year in age) leads to swift population growth of pigeons in the flock. This fact, and the number of pigeons lost in races or intentionally released, leads to exponential growth in free-living, feral populations.

==== Life stages ====
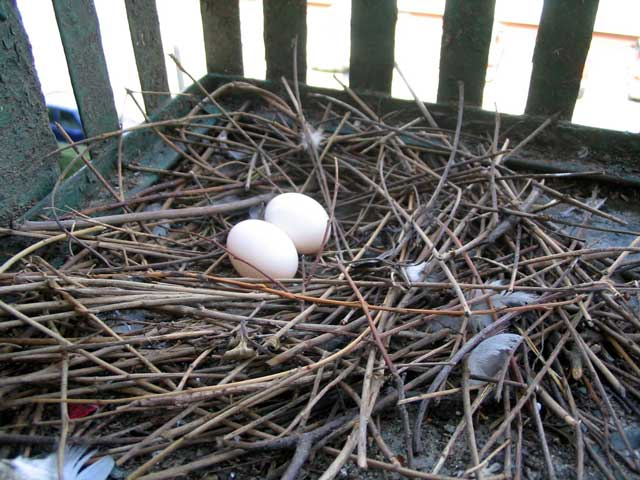
Feral pigeon nest with two eggs

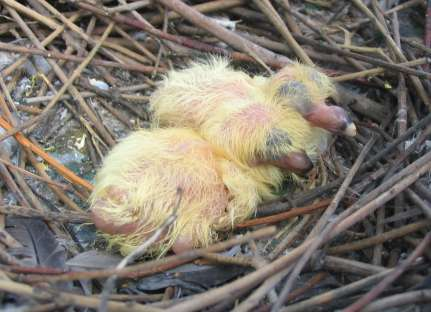
Nestlings, one day

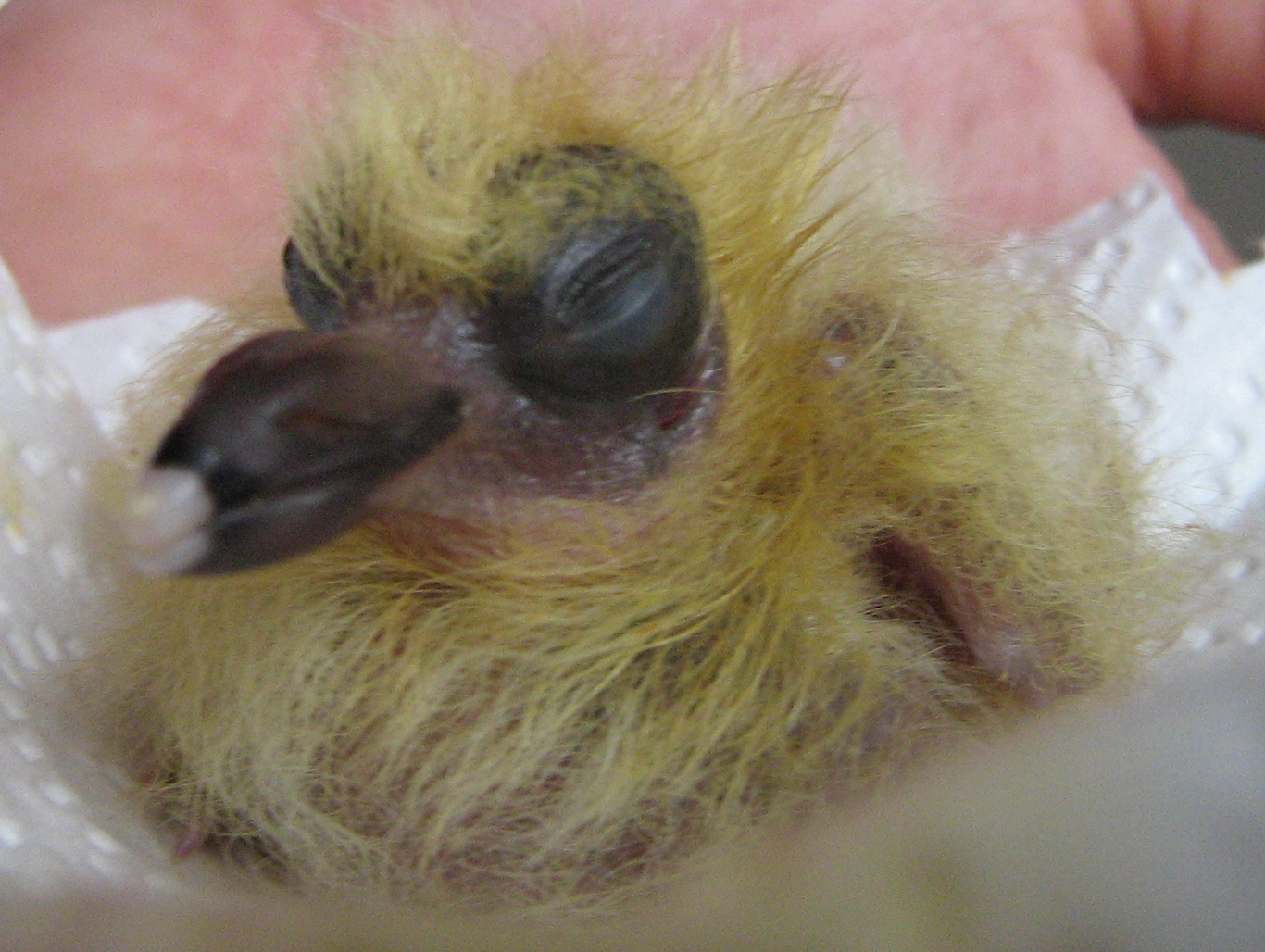
Nestling, five days

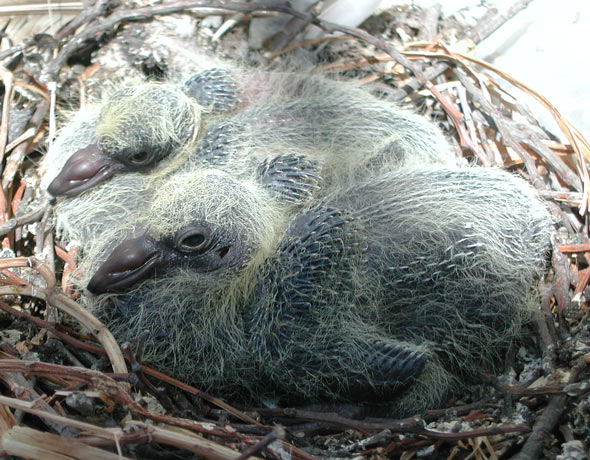
Nestlings, about 10 days

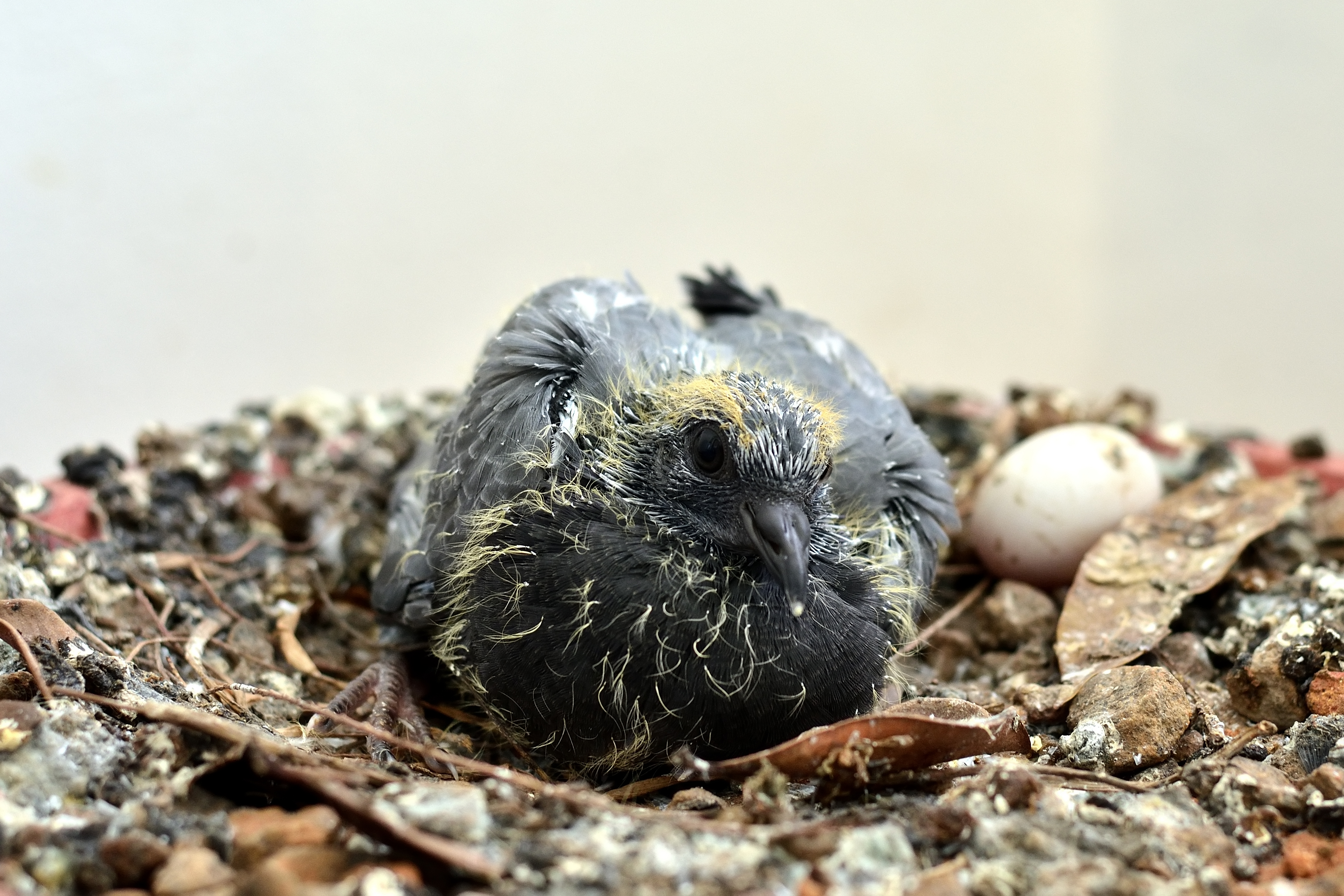
18 days old

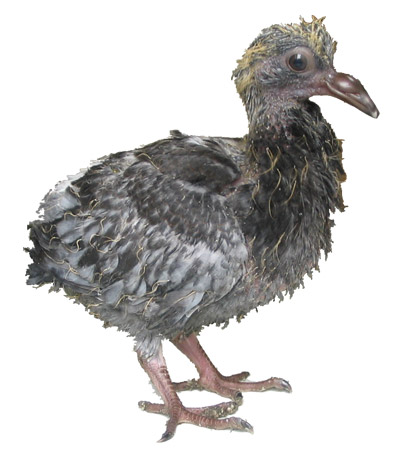
Young bird, 22 days

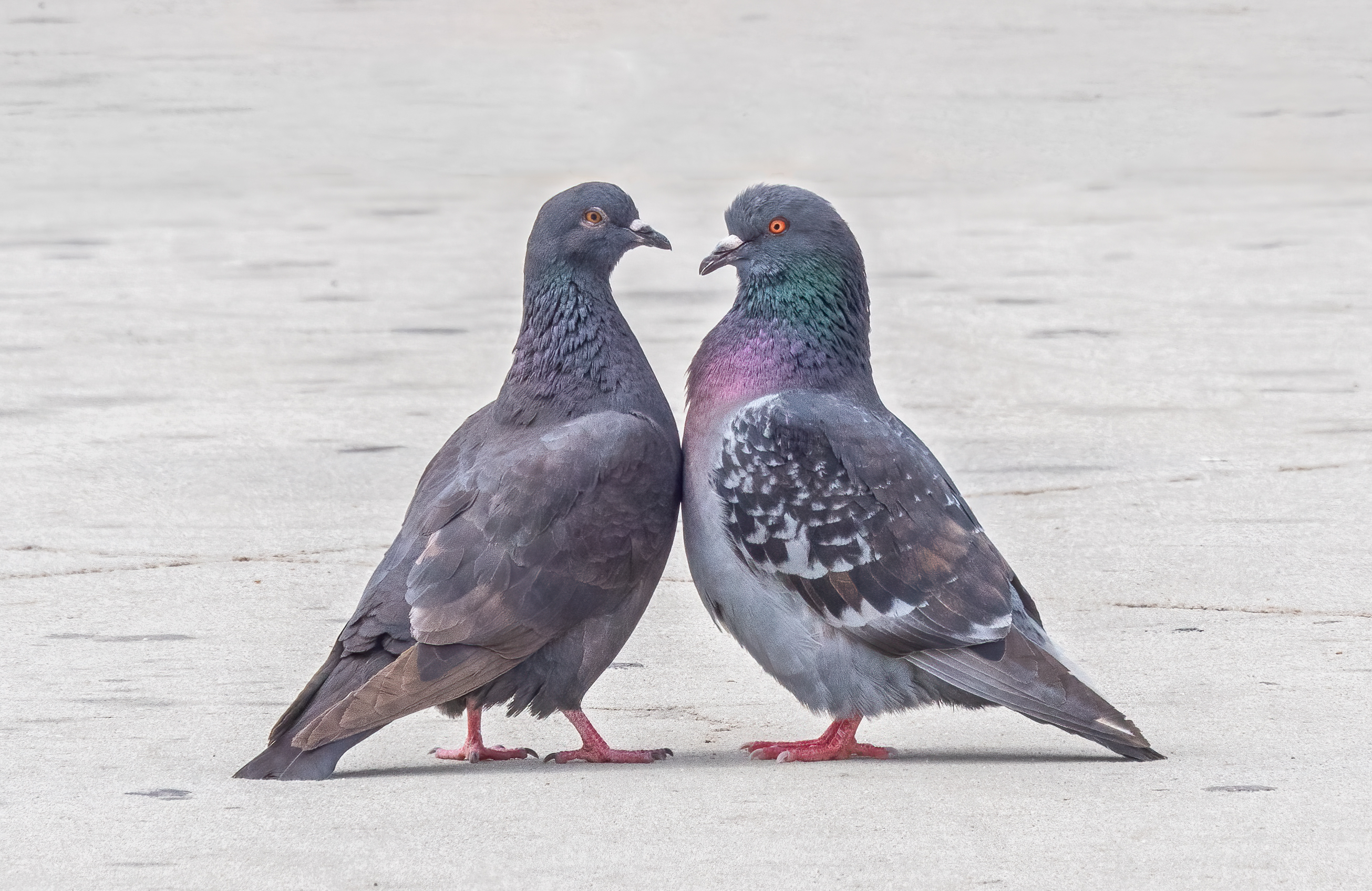
Feral pigeons in courtship

=== Pigeon related illness ===
Pigeon breeders sometimes suffer from an ailment known as bird fancier's lung or pigeon lung. A form of hypersensitivity pneumonitis, pigeon lung is caused by the inhalation of the avian proteins found in feathers and dung. It can sometimes be combated by wearing a filtered mask. Other pigeon related pathogens causing lung disease are Chlamydophila psittaci (which causes psittacosis), Histoplasma capsulatum (which causes histoplasmosis) and Cryptococcus neoformans, which causes cryptococcosis. Avian paramyxovirus is virus carried by pigeons causing lesions and swelling in unvaccinated birds.

Avian mites may infest domestic pigeons and cause gamasoidosis in humans. There are several methods to treat birds infested with mites or louse, including external insecticides and oral medicine.

== Uses ==
=== For food ===
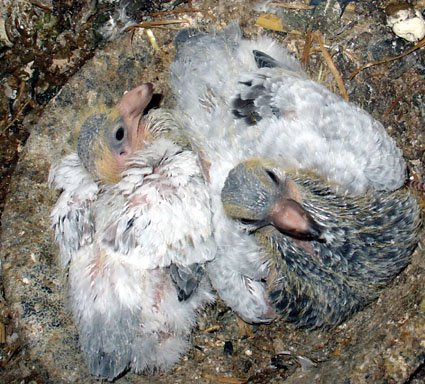
Two squabs in their nest. Sharing this trait with many columbids, a domestic pigeon hen has a maximum clutch size of two.

Pigeons bred for meat are generally referred to as a meat or utility breed. The term "squab" can either refer to young birds or the meat harvested from them; these birds grow to a very large size in the nest before they fledge and are able to fly; during this stage of development they are often fattier and seen as being tastier than the fully-flighted adults. Squabs during this stage are valued as food; in Neolithic and early agricultural communities they were an easy and reliable source of protein, the birds requiring only reliable sources of grains and water (which they independently foraged for) to enter breeding condition, and the rock formations they nested in would have made for attractive dwellings for early humans.

Pigeon meat, both from squabs and from adult birds, are still a source of protein for people worldwide. Breeds of pigeons harvested for their meat during adulthood are collectively known as utility pigeons. For commercial meat production a breed of large white pigeon, the King pigeon, has been developed by selective breeding.

=== Homing pigeons ===
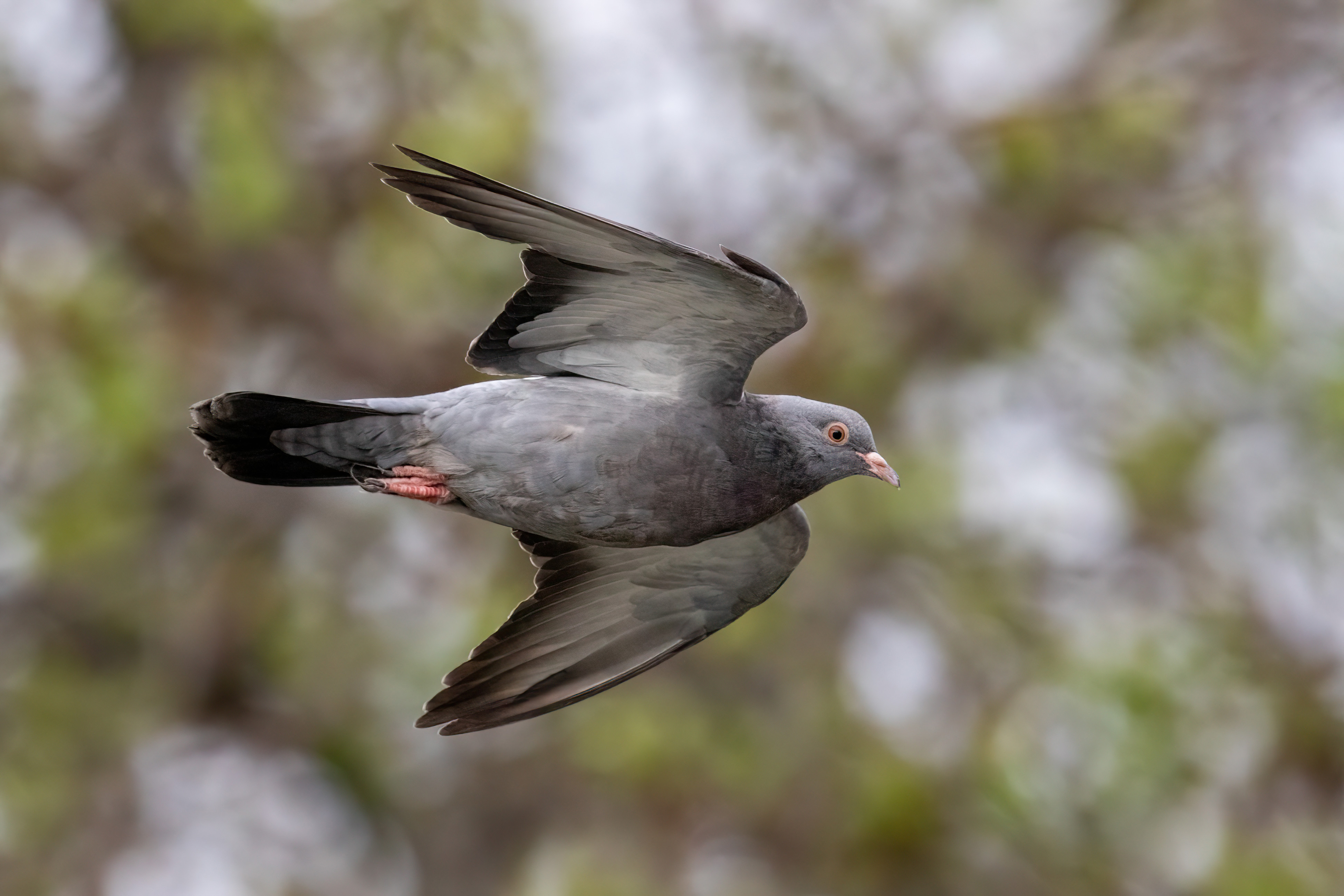
Pigeon in flight. Coupled with their honed sense of direction, the flight speed of a homing pigeon made them a reliable, sometimes the only, method of sending small objects over long distances.

Homing pigeons are a specialised type of pigeon bred for navigation and speed. Originally developed through selective breeding to carry messages, most notably during warfare, members of this variety of pigeon are still being used in the sport of pigeon racing and the ceremony of releasing white doves at social events.

These breeds of domestic pigeons, especially when trained are able to return to the home loft if released at a location that they have never visited before and that may be up to 1,000 km (620 mi) away. This ability of a pigeon to return home from a foreign location necessitates two sorts of information. The first, called "map sense" is their geographic location. The second, "compass sense" is the bearing they need to fly from their new location to reach their home. Both of these senses, however, respond to a number of different cues in different situations. The most popular conception of how pigeons are able to do this is that they are able to sense the Earth's magnetic field with tiny magnetic tissues in their head (magnetoception), though the exact location of the magnetoception organ is still being researched; Areas of the pigeon brain that respond with increased activity to magnetic fields are the posterior vestibular nuclei, dorsal thalamus, hippocampus, and visual hyperpallium. Wherever the organ is, pigeons can detect magnetic anomalies as weak as 1.86 gauss.

Another theory is that pigeons have compass sense, which uses the position of the sun, along with an internal clock, to work out direction. However, studies have shown that if magnetic disruption or clock changes disrupt these senses, the pigeon can still manage to get home. The variability in the effects of manipulations to these sense of the pigeons indicates that there is more than one cue on which navigation is based and that map sense appears to rely on a comparison of available cues.

Other potential cues used include

- The use of a sun compass
- Nocturnal navigation by stars
- Visual landmark map
- Navigation by infrasound map
- Polarised light compass
- Olfactory stimuli (see also olfactory navigation)

=== Display ===
==== Flying/sporting ====
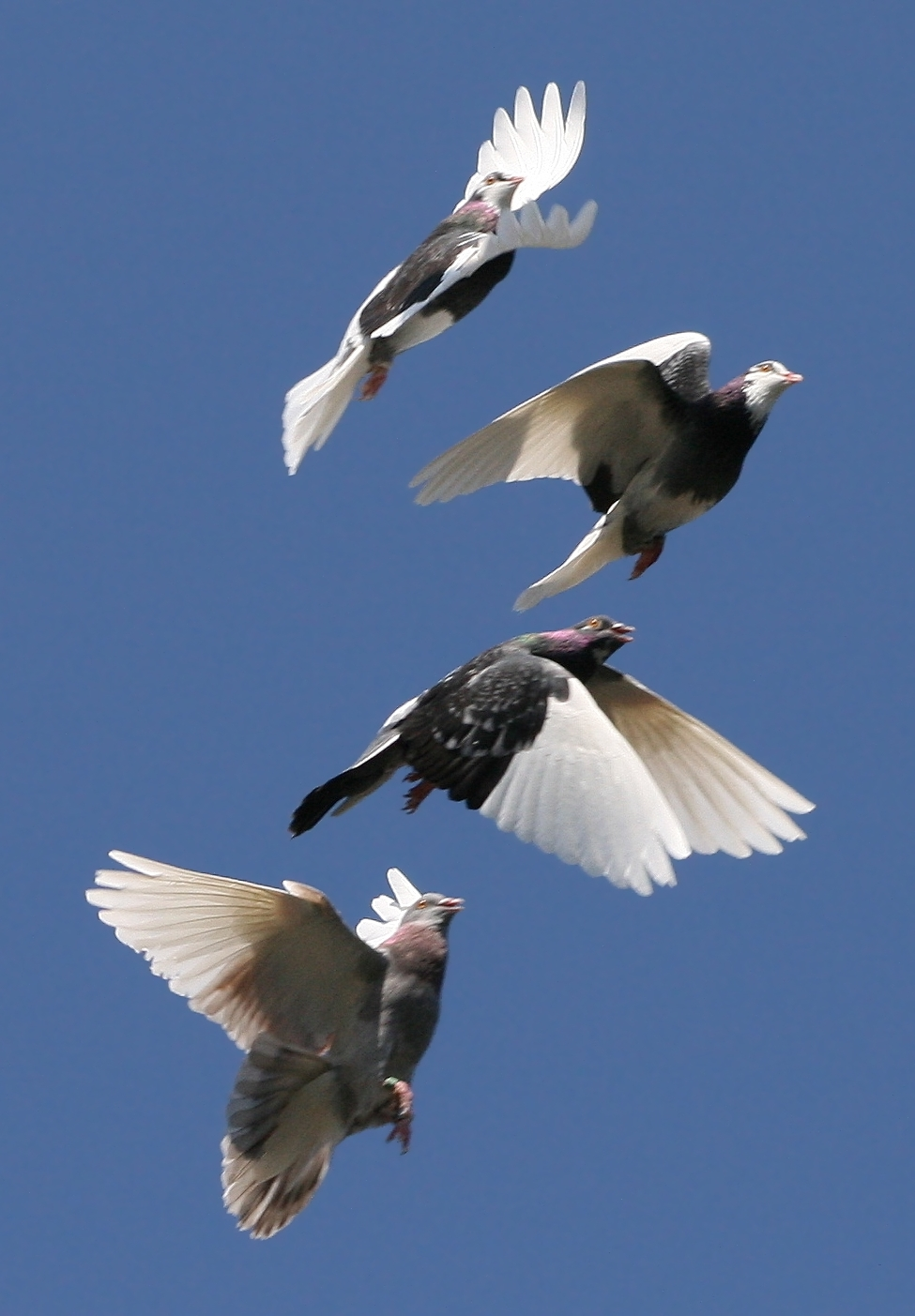
Pigeons of different plumage in flight

Pigeons are also kept by enthusiasts for the enjoyment of Flying/Sporting competitions. Unlike racers, these birds are not released far from their home lofts; breeds such as tipplers are bred for the ability to hover above the loft for hours at a time. Their ability to hover for a long time shows the ability of the keeper to select for endurance.

Wild pigeons naturally flip or somersault when evading aerial predators such as large-bodied falcons; they are naturally selected by the extreme speeds that some stooping falcons reach (over 320 km/h (200 mph)), being able to dodge this attack at the last second. Tumbler and roller pigeons are bred to enhance this ability; some birds have been recorded to be able to somersault on the ground and land on its feet, and some breeds are even deliberately bred to a point where the rolling ability is debilitative, being wholly unable to fly due to it.

A breed called the zurito, bred for its speed, may be used in live pigeon shooting.

==== Exhibition breeds ====
Pigeon fanciers developed many exotic forms of pigeon through selective breeding.

As pigeonkeepers accrued more experience, they started selecting for increasingly more unusual features in their birds; features such as unusual plumage patterns and colours, various crests, foot feathering, altered stance and proportion, or unusual behaviour, are well represented in extant pigeon breeds. These birds are generally classed as fancy pigeons.

Pigeon shows are conventions where pigeon fanciers and breeders meet to compete and trade their fancy pigeons. The various pigeon breeds dubbed "American show" were developed specifically by pigeon show frequenters pursuing a certain show standard determined by the National Pigeon Association. Fanciers compete against each other at exhibitions or shows and the different forms or breeds are judged to a standard to decide who has the best bird.

There are many fancy or ornamental breeds of pigeons; among them are the English carrier pigeons, a variety of pigeon with prominent wattles and an almost vertical stance, the Duchess breed, which has as a prominent characteristic feet that are completely covered by a sort of fan of feathers, the fantails with a fan of tail feathers like a peacock, and the Voorburg Shield Cropper which are bred to inflate their crops.

Variety of fancy pigeons

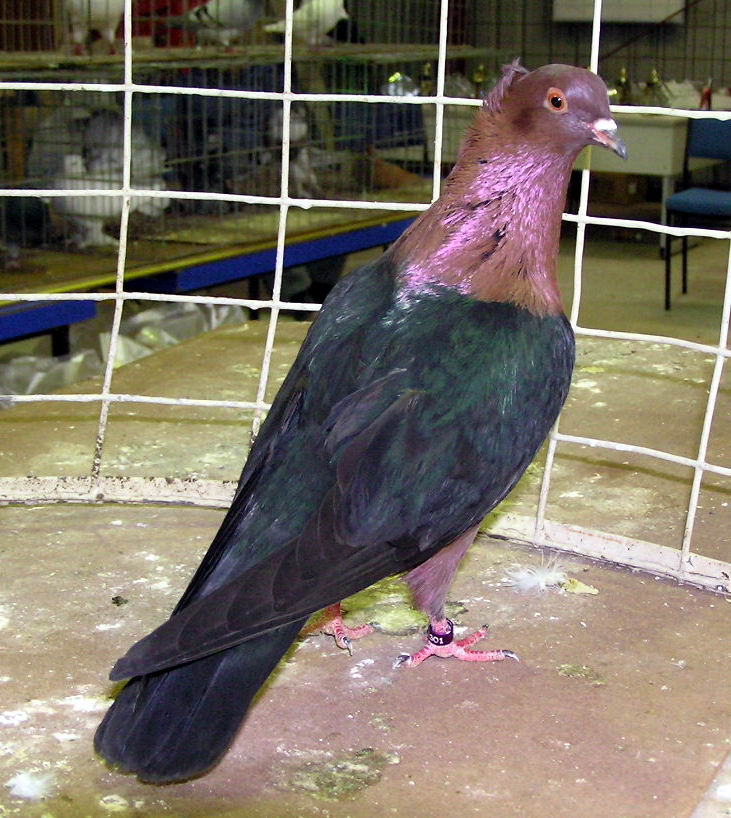
Archangel showing its extensive iridescence

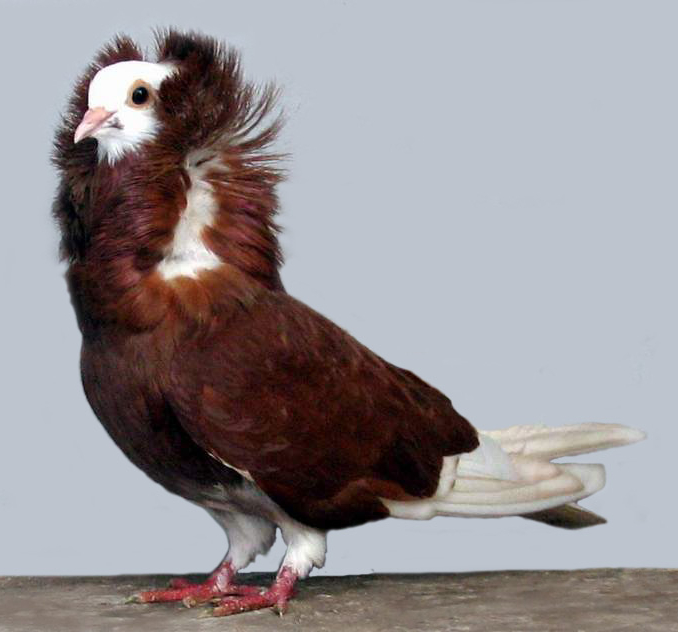
Old Dutch Capuchine

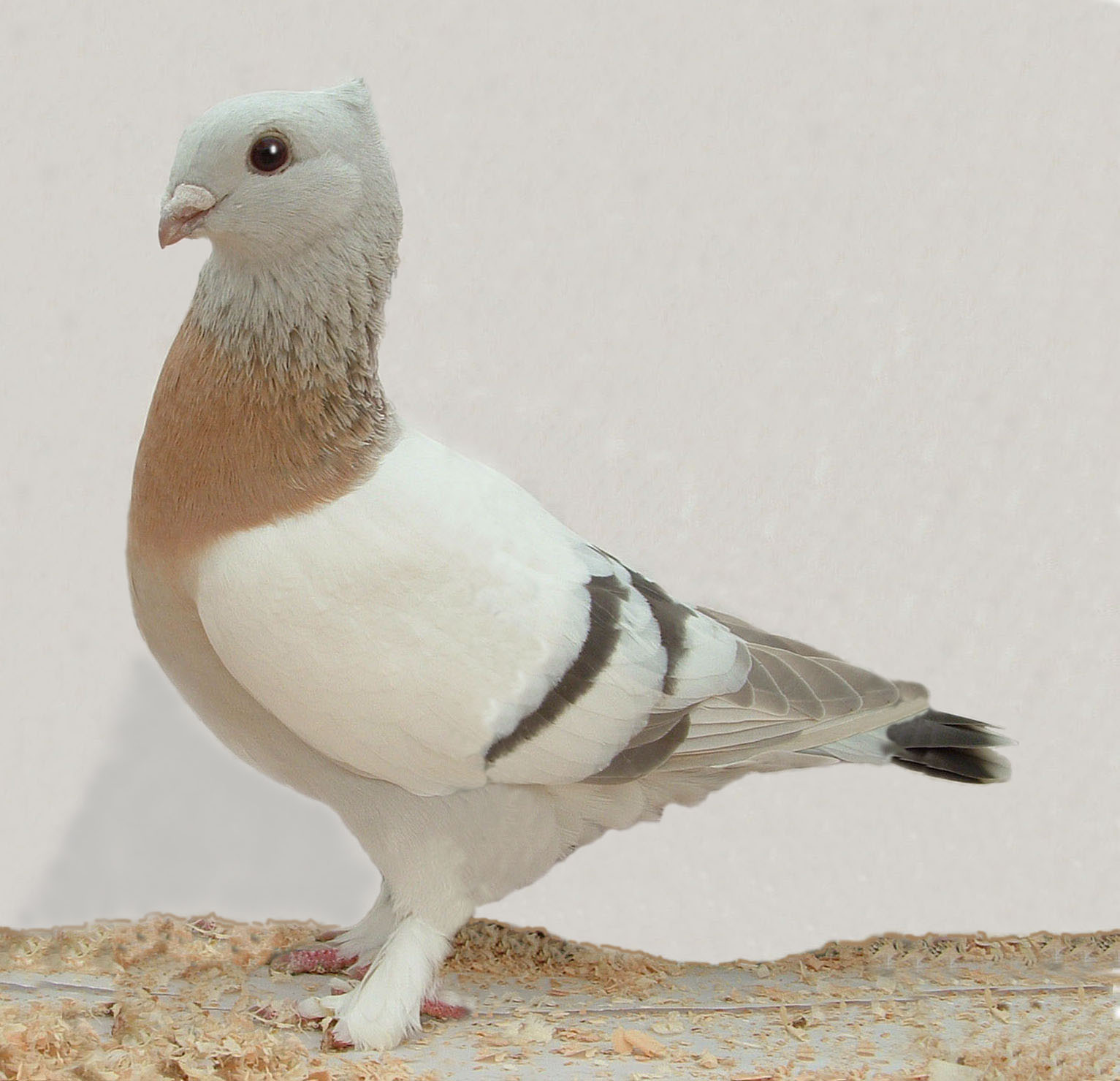
Lucerne Gold Collar

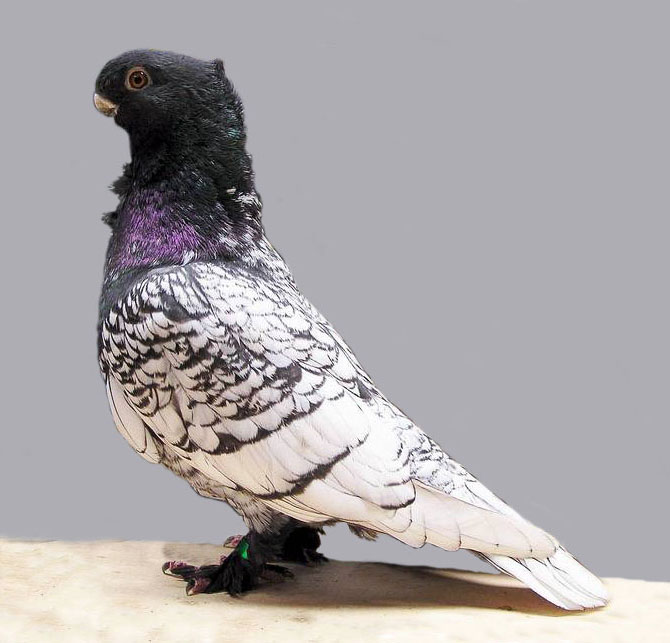
Oriental Frill

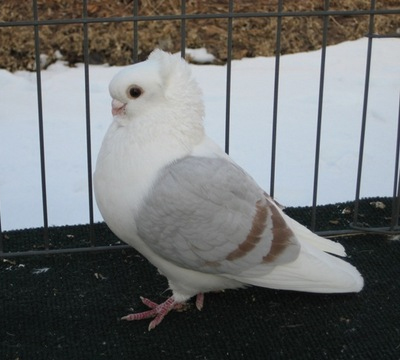
Old German Owl

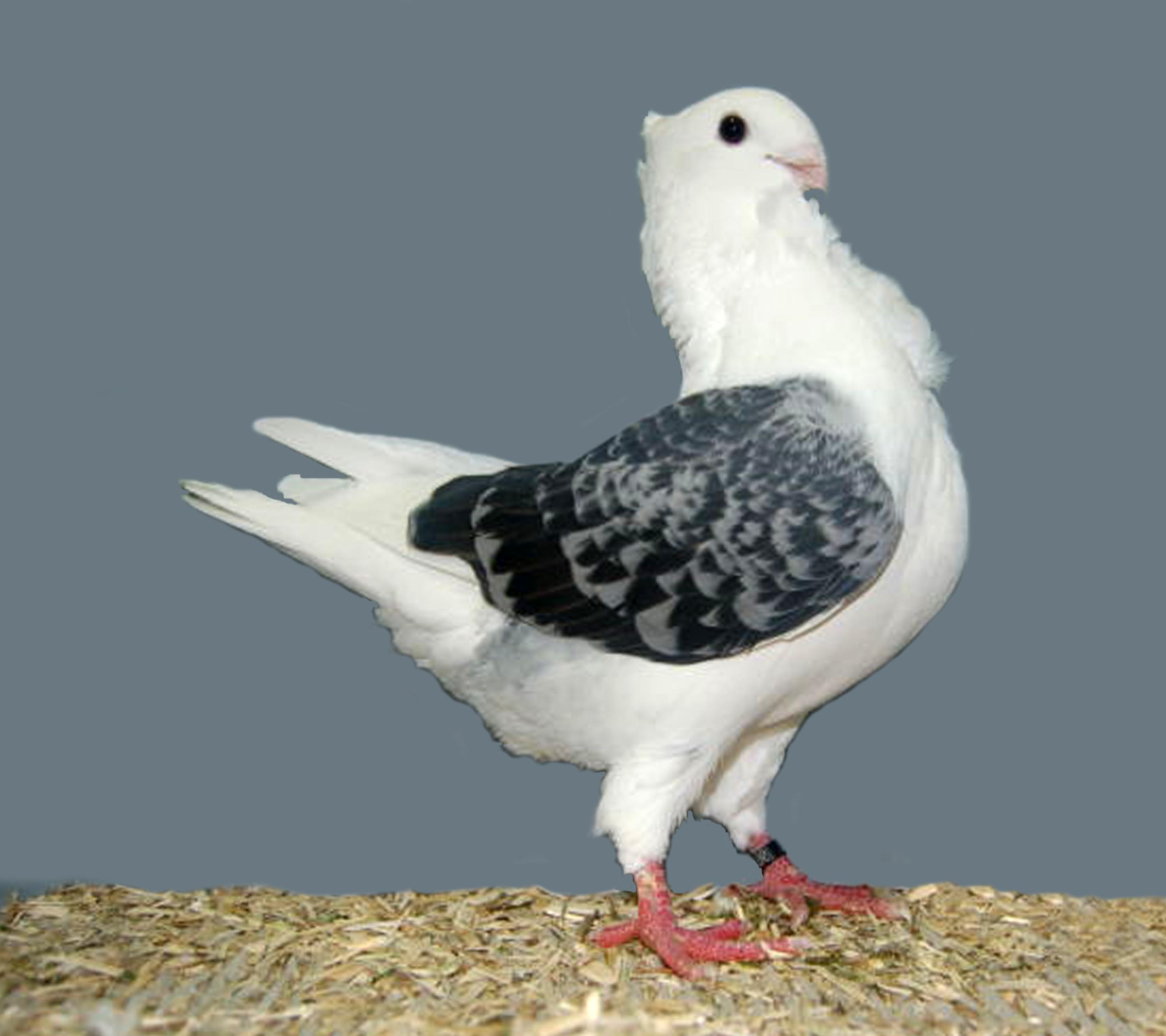
Old Dutch Owl

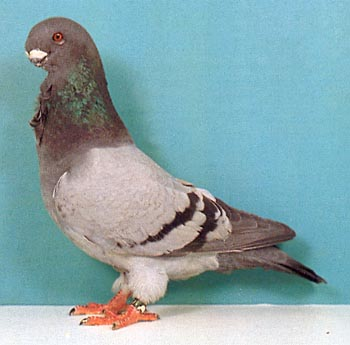
English Owl

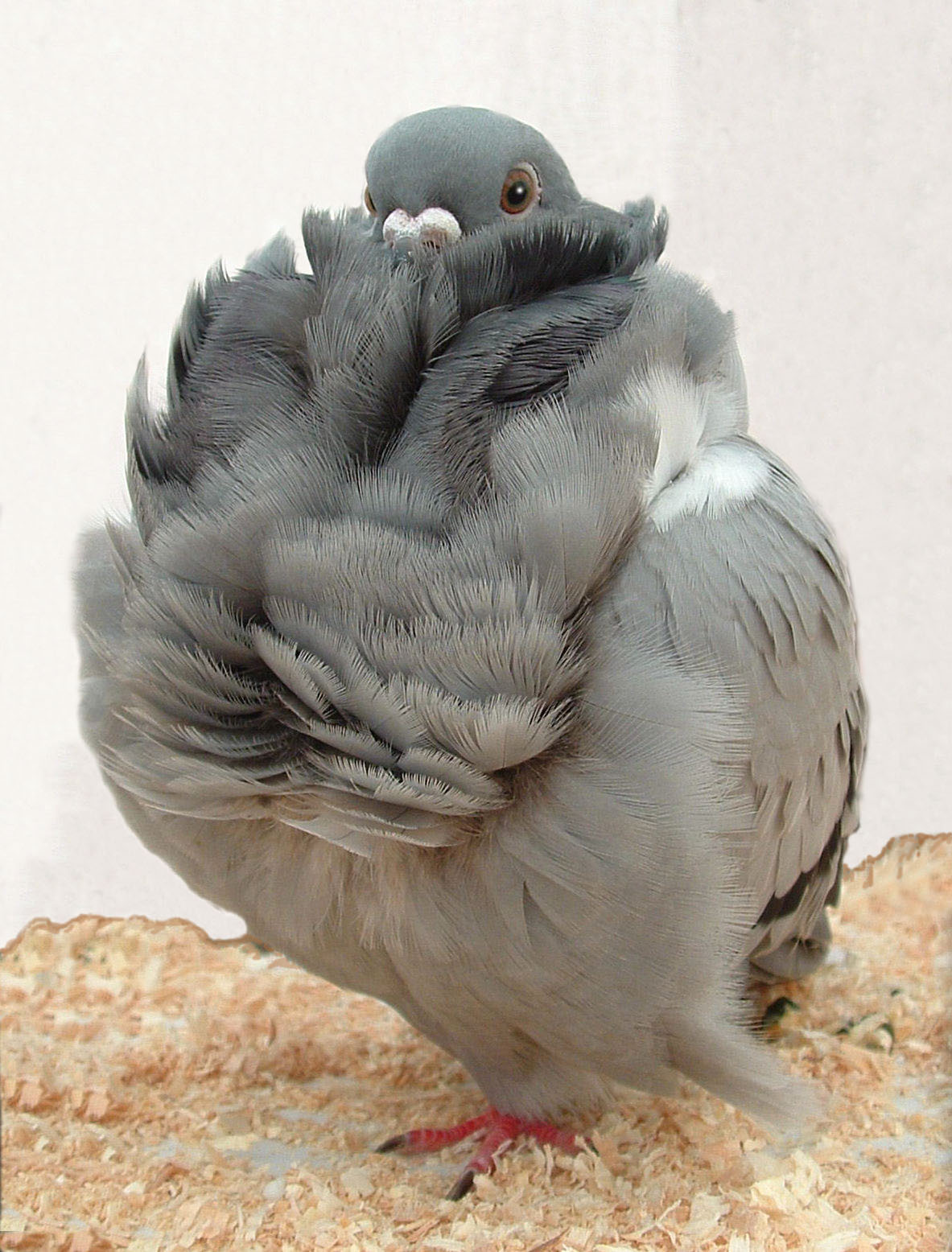
Chinese Owl

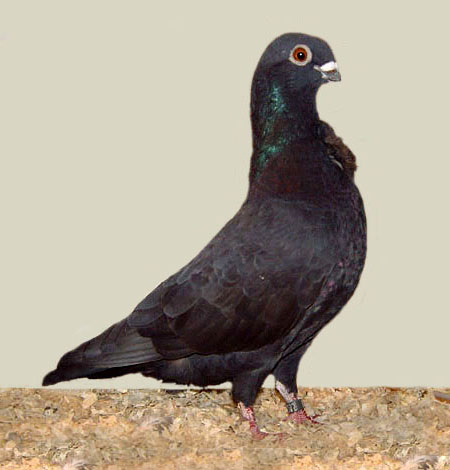
Valencian Figurita, one of the smallest breeds of pigeon

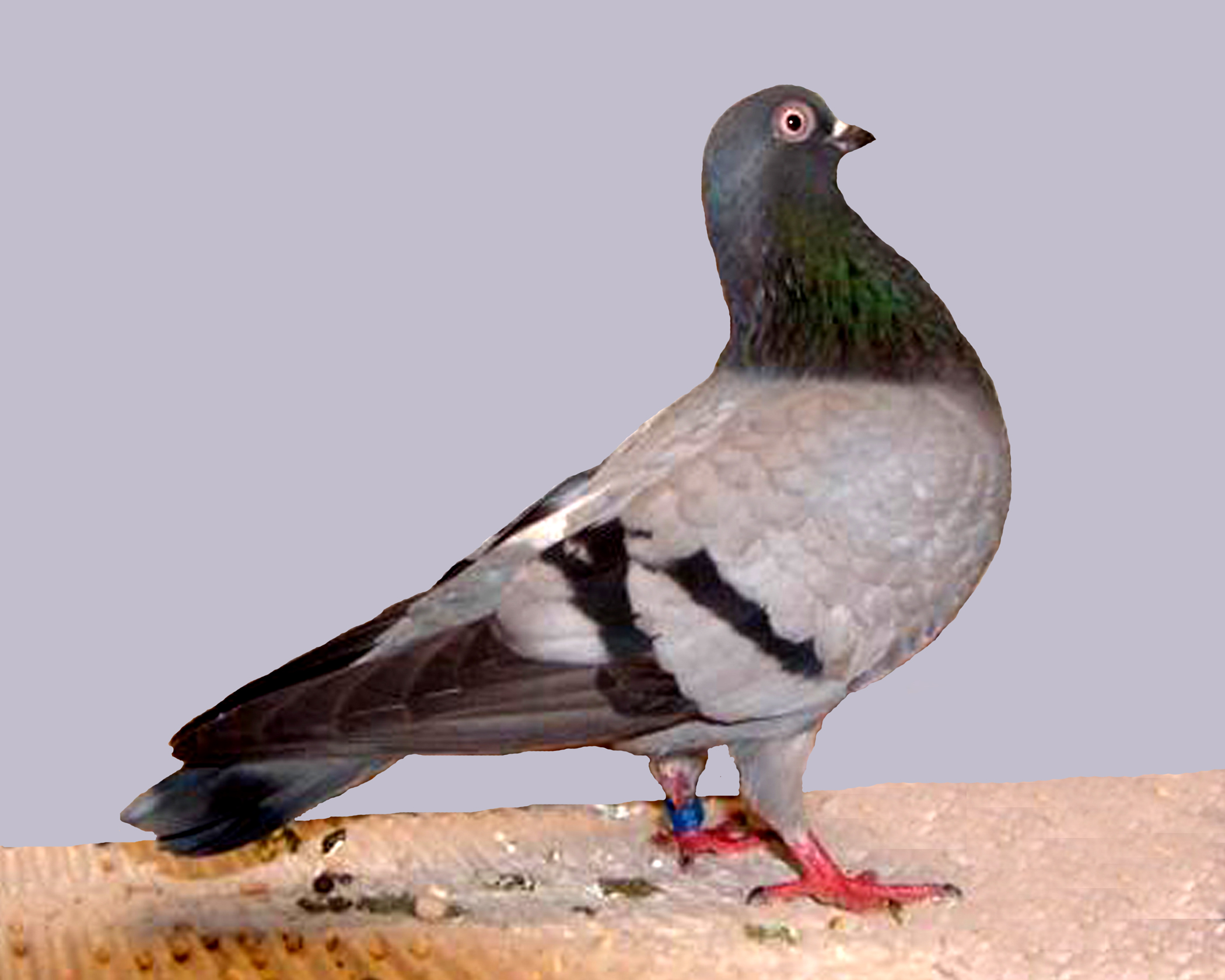
Portuguese tumbler, another small breed of pigeon

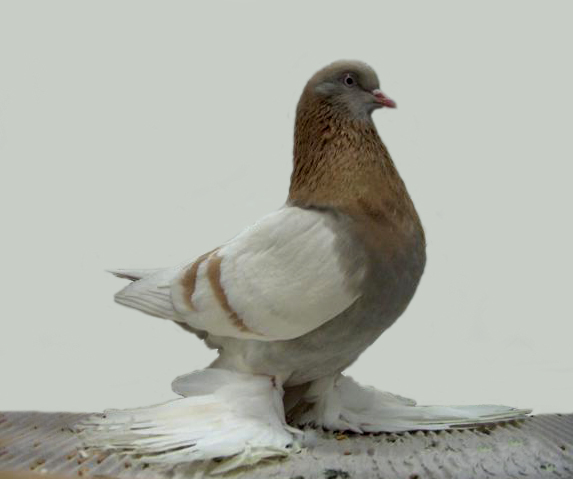
Old Dutch Tumbler

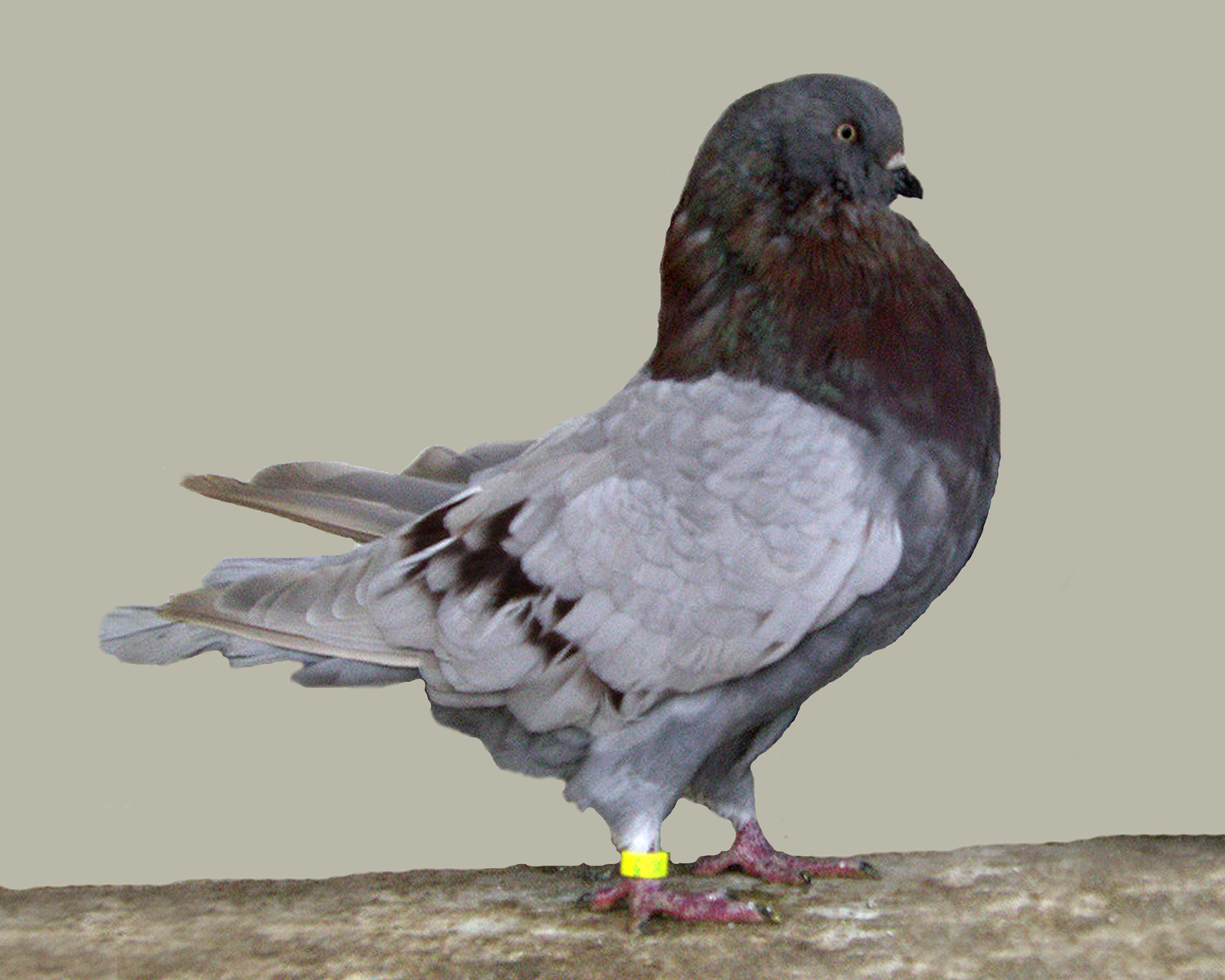
The Giant Runt, one of the largest pigeon breeds

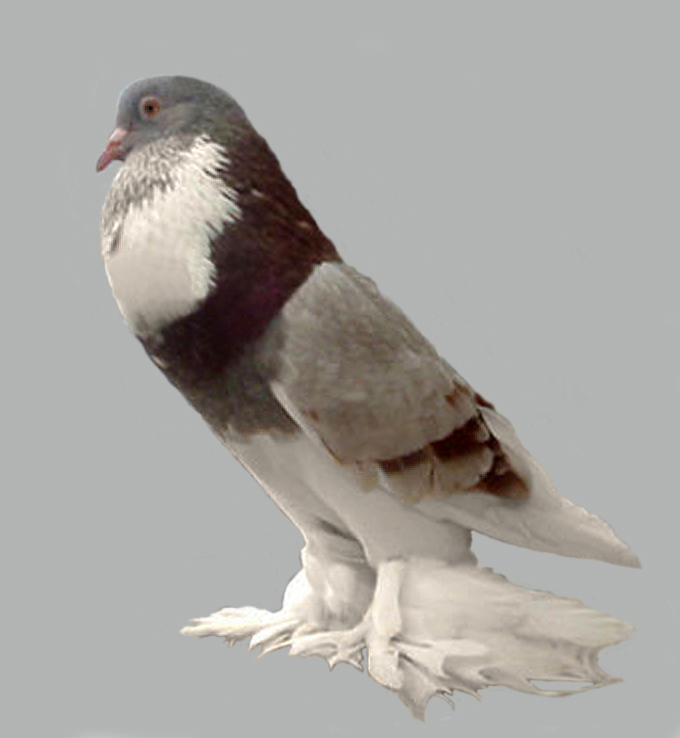
Ghent Cropper

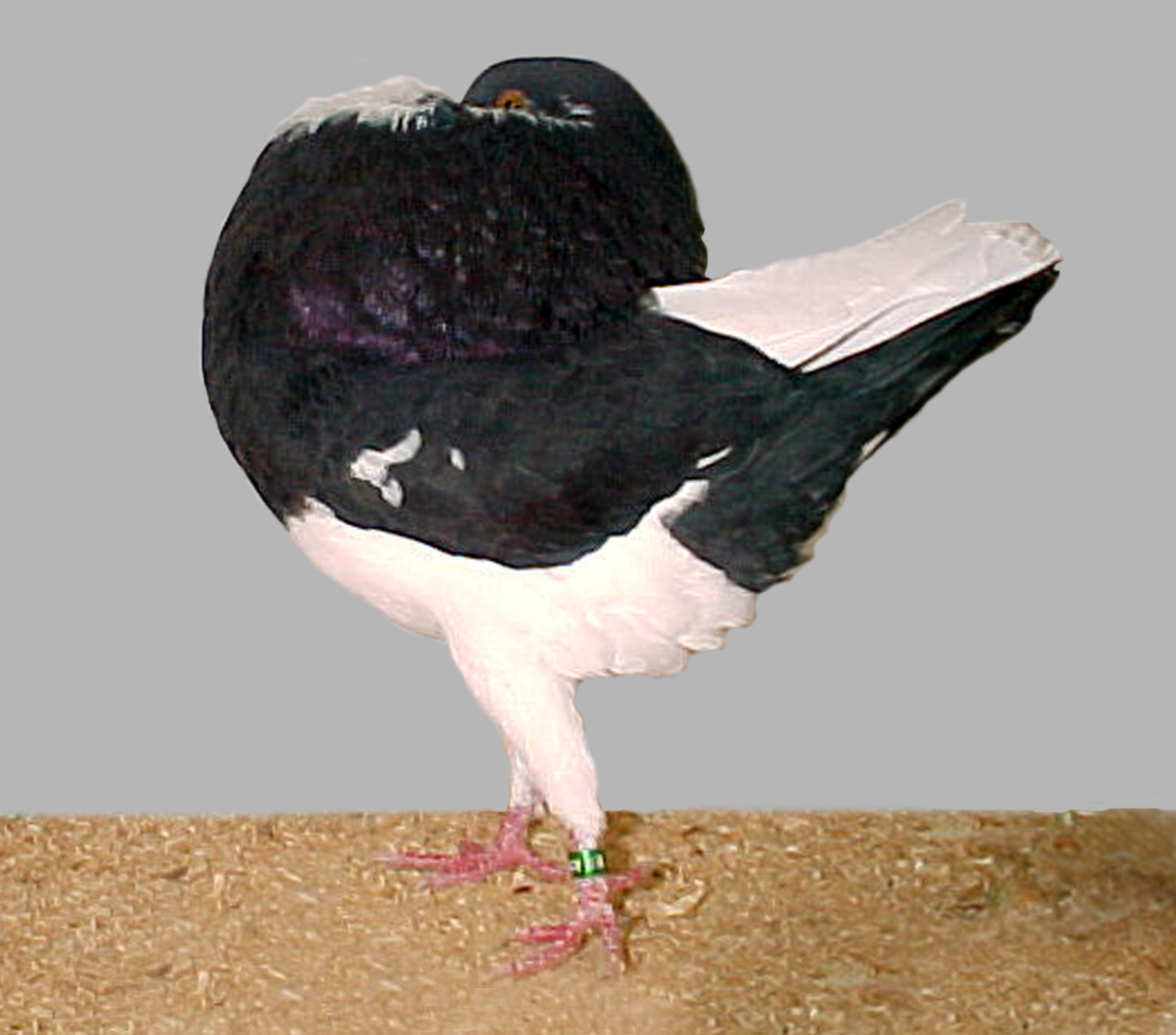
Holle Cropper

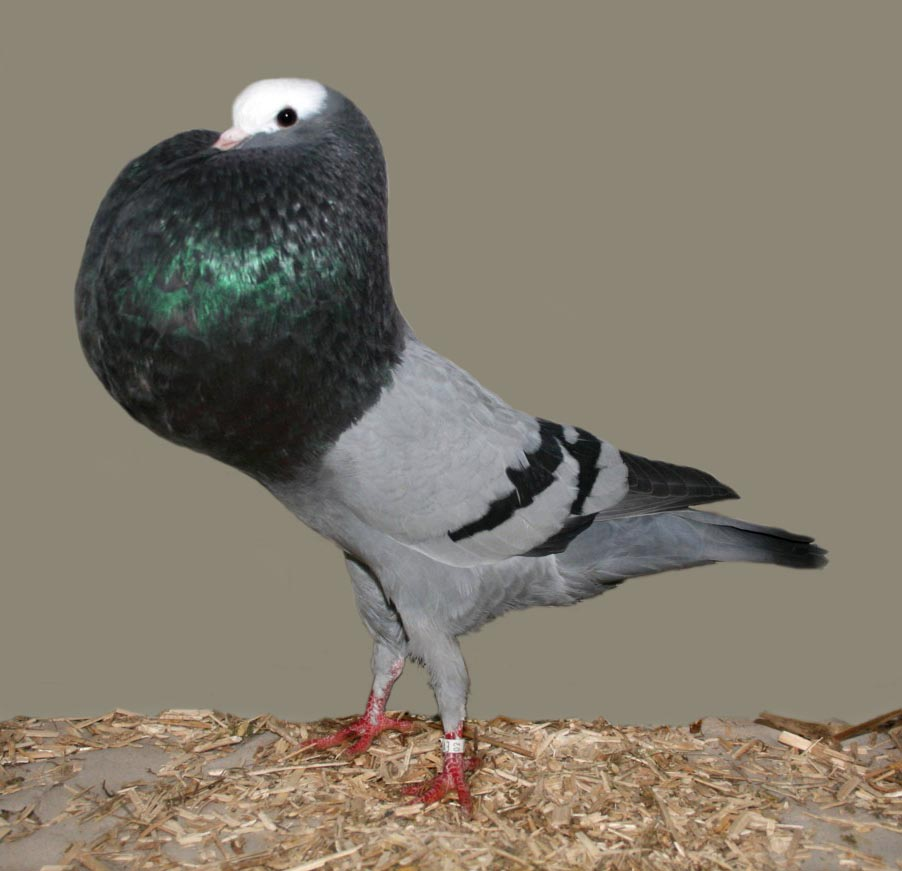
Silesian Cropper

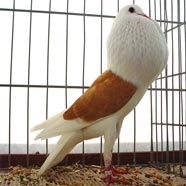
Voorburg Shield Cropper

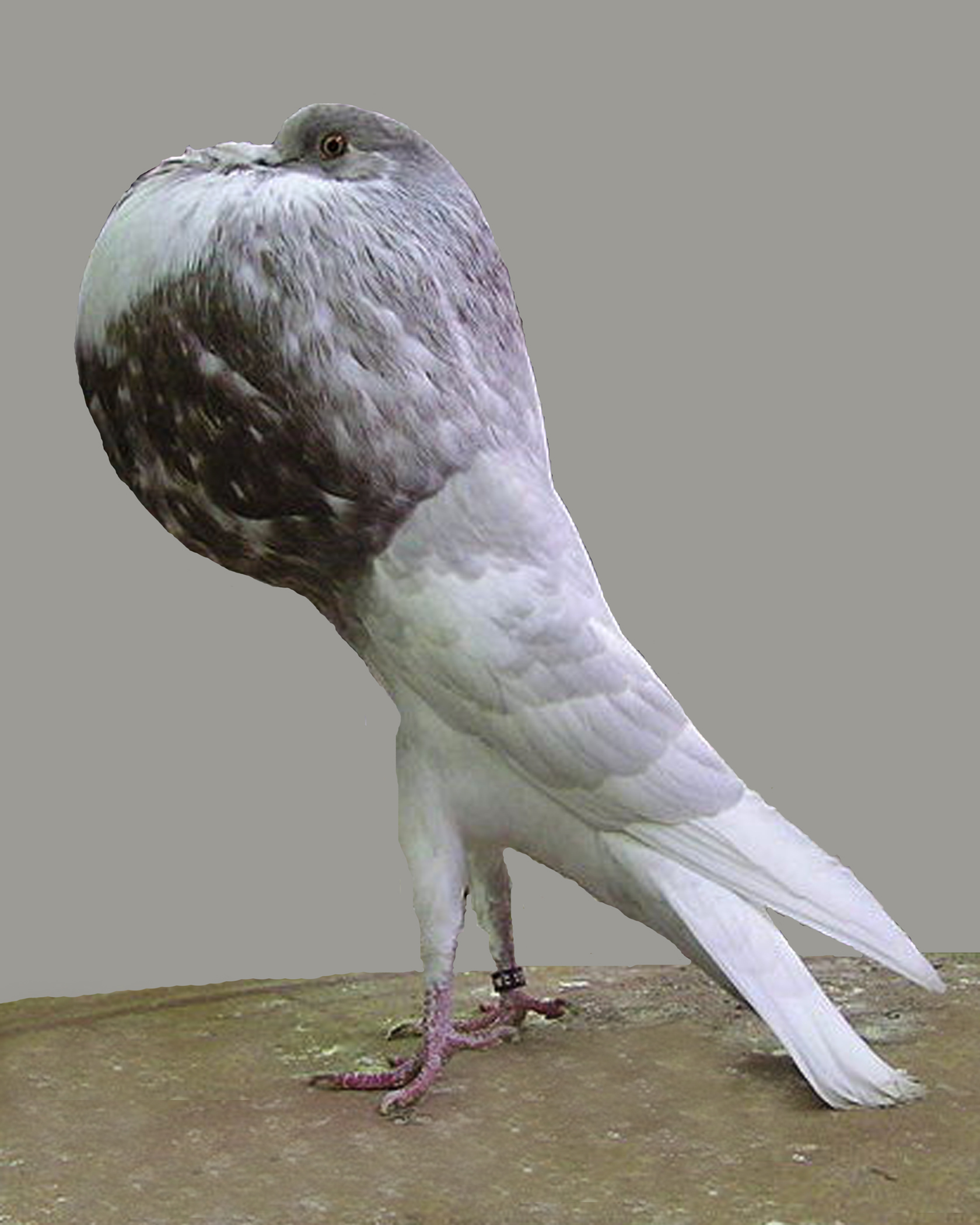
Norwich Cropper

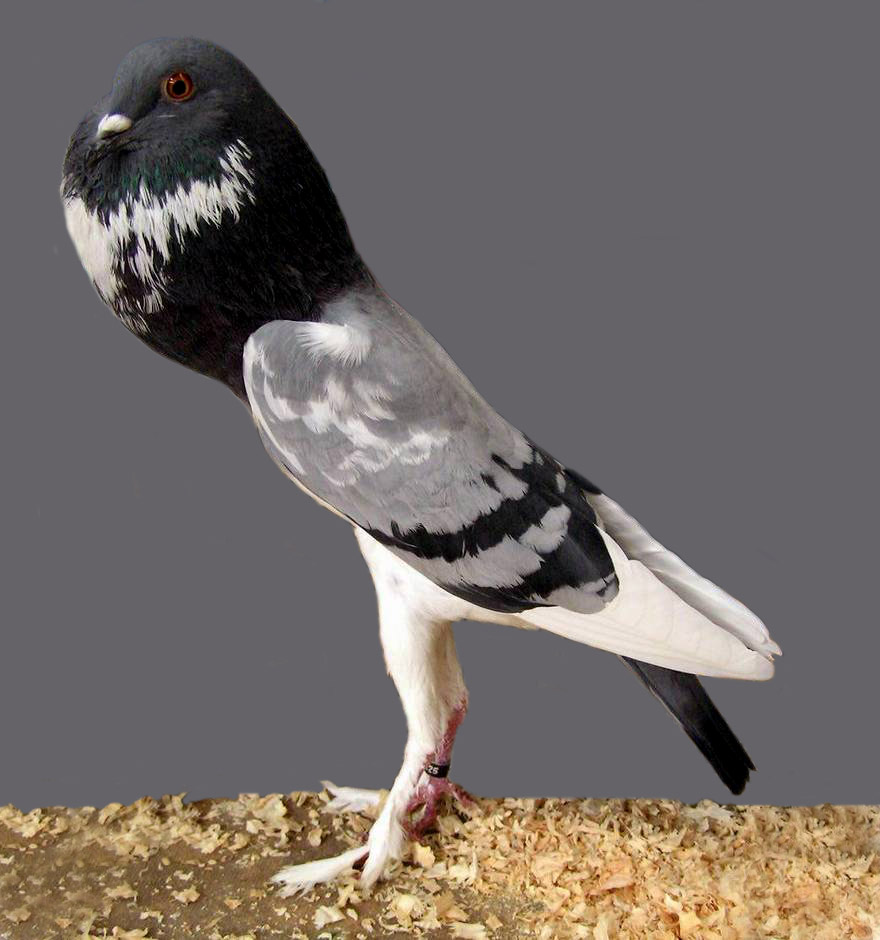
Pygmy pouter

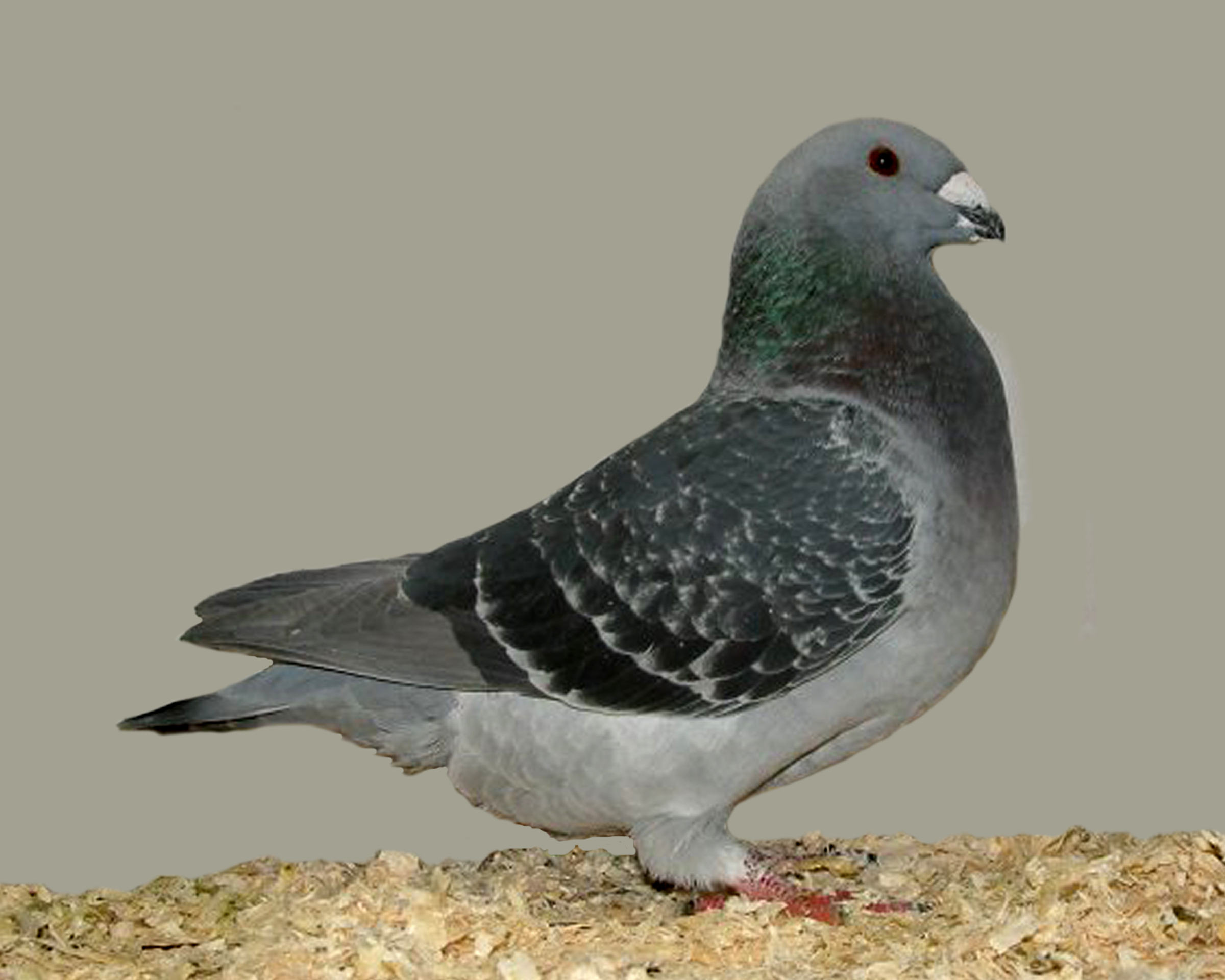
American Show Racer

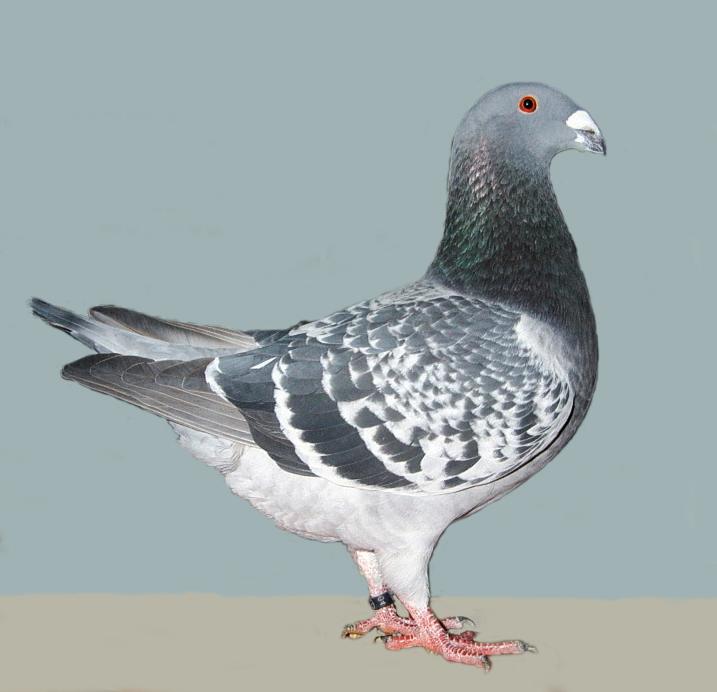
Dutch Beauty Homer

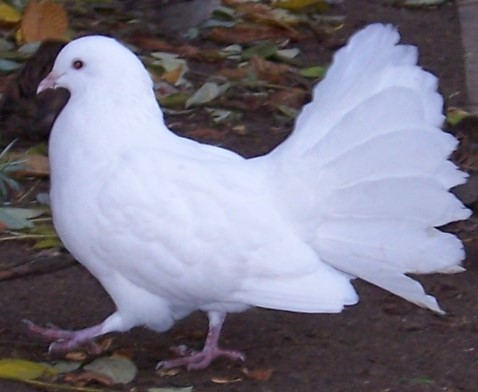
Garden or English Fantail

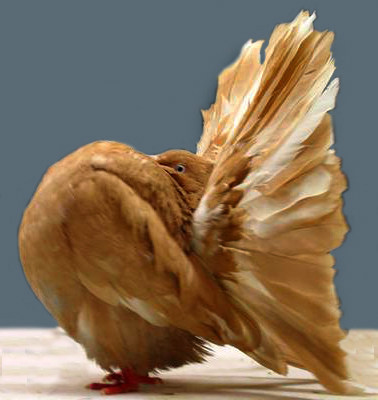
American Fantail

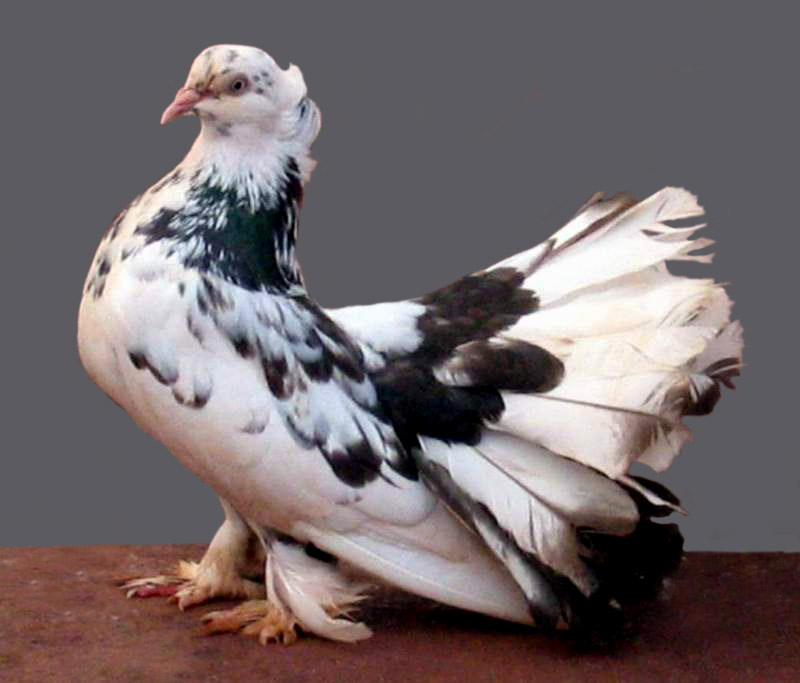
Indian Fantail

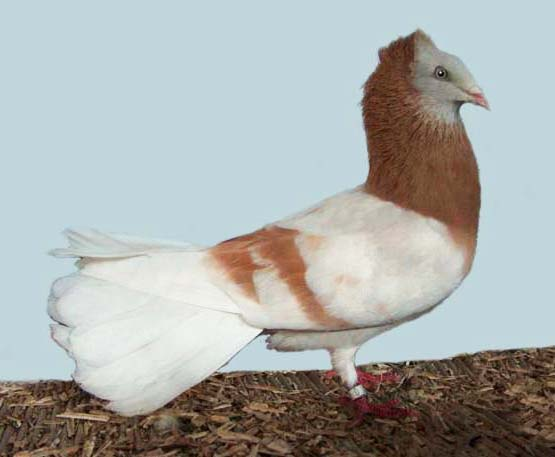
Danzig Highflyer

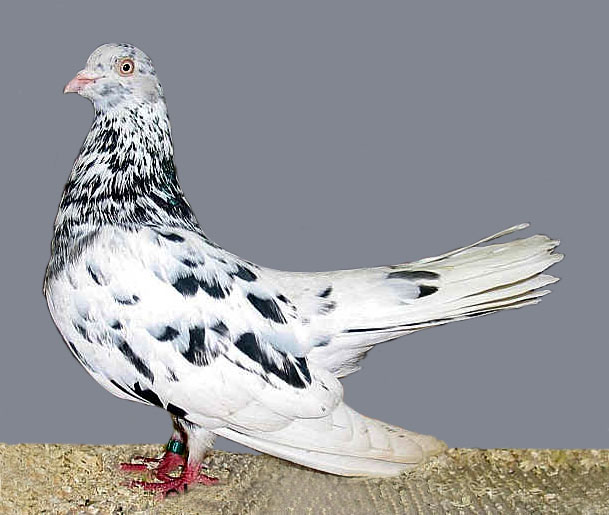
Oriental Roller

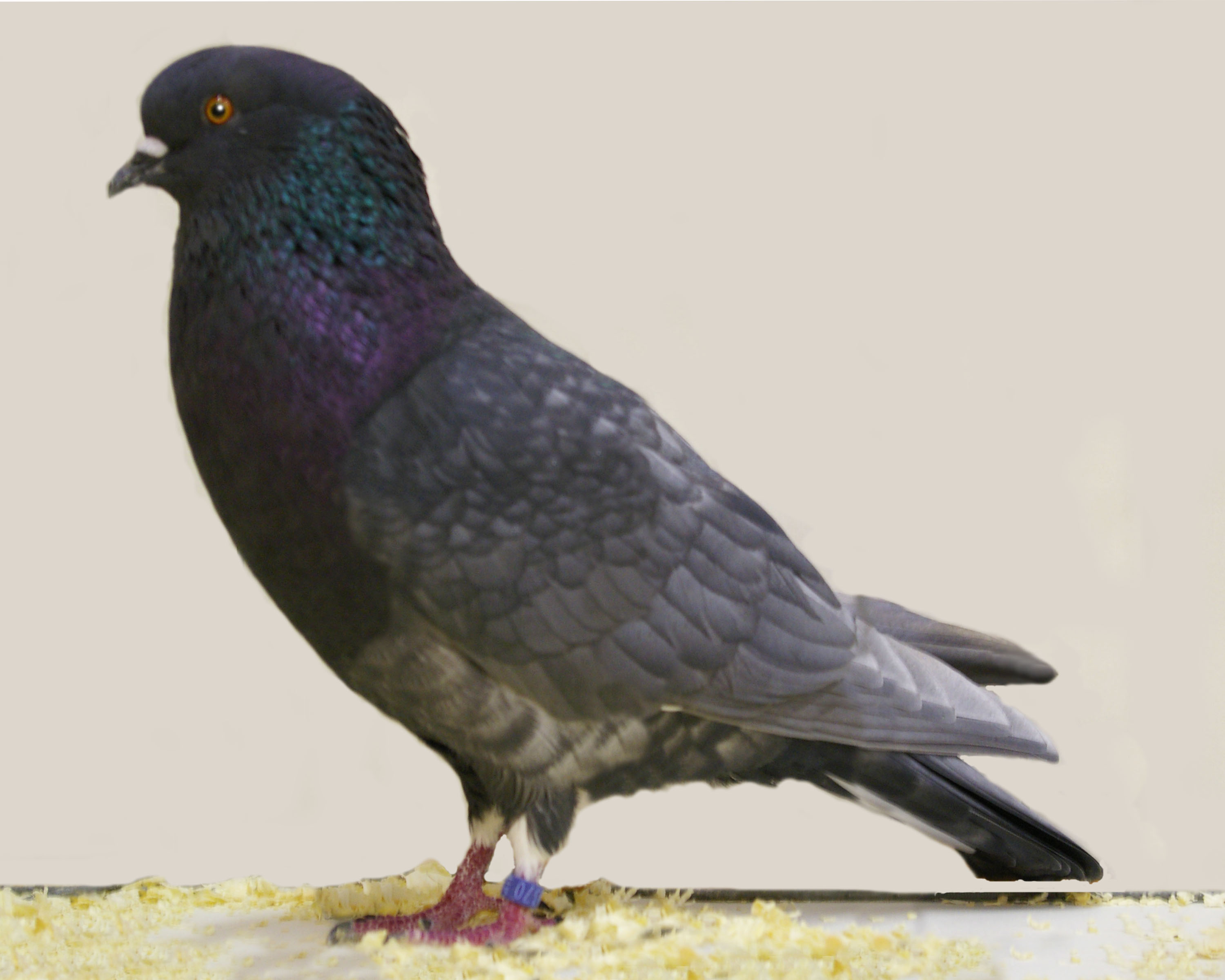
Birmingham Roller

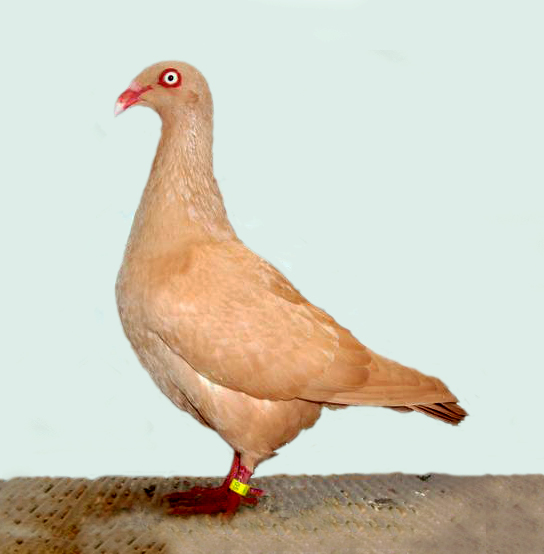
Danish Tumbler

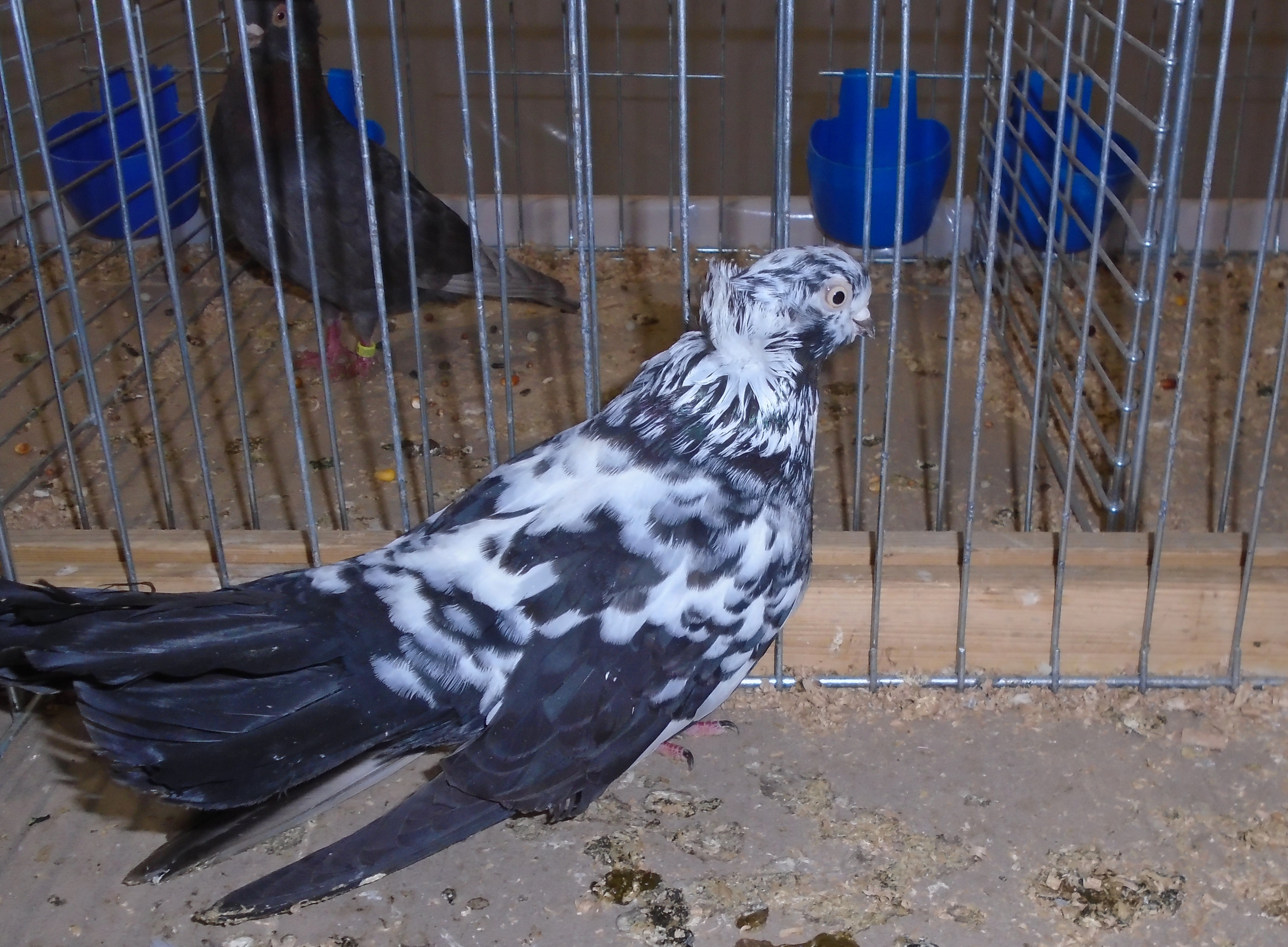
Zagreb Tumbler

=== Experimentation ===
Domestic pigeons are model organisms commonly used in laboratory experiments relating to biology; often to test medicines and chemical substances, or in cognitive sciences. Research in pigeons is widespread, encompassing shape and texture perception, exemplar and prototype memory, category-based and associative concepts.

Pigeons have been trained to distinguish between cubist and impressionist paintings.

In Project Sea Hunt, a US Coast Guard search and rescue project in the 1970s and 1980s, pigeons were shown to be more effective than humans in spotting shipwreck victims at sea.

Pigeons are able to acquire orthographic processing skills, which form part of the ability to read, and basic numerical skills equivalent to those shown in primates.

Pigeons have been used as medical imaging data sorters. They have been successfully trained under research conditions to examine data on a screen for the purposes of detecting breast cancer. They appear to use their innate visual navigation skills to do so.

=== Pets ===
Pigeons are sometimes kept as indoor pets, with the practice's popularity growing over recent years. These pet pigeons may be outfitted with "pigeon pants" (a diaper-like garment) to maintain cleanliness, and some birds may be "potty trained".

== Other relation to humans ==
Domestic pigeons, especially the leucistic and albinistic specimens commonly referred to as "white doves", have had a long history in symbolism.

=== Illegal predator killing ===
In the United States, some pigeon keepers illegally trap and kill hawks and falcons to protect their pigeons. In the West Midlands region of the United Kingdom pigeon fanciers have been blamed for a trap campaign to kill peregrine falcons. Eight illegal spring-loaded traps were found close to peregrine nests and at least one of the birds died. The steel traps are thought to have been set as part of a "concerted campaign" to kill as many of the birds as possible in the West Midlands.

=== Feral pigeons ===
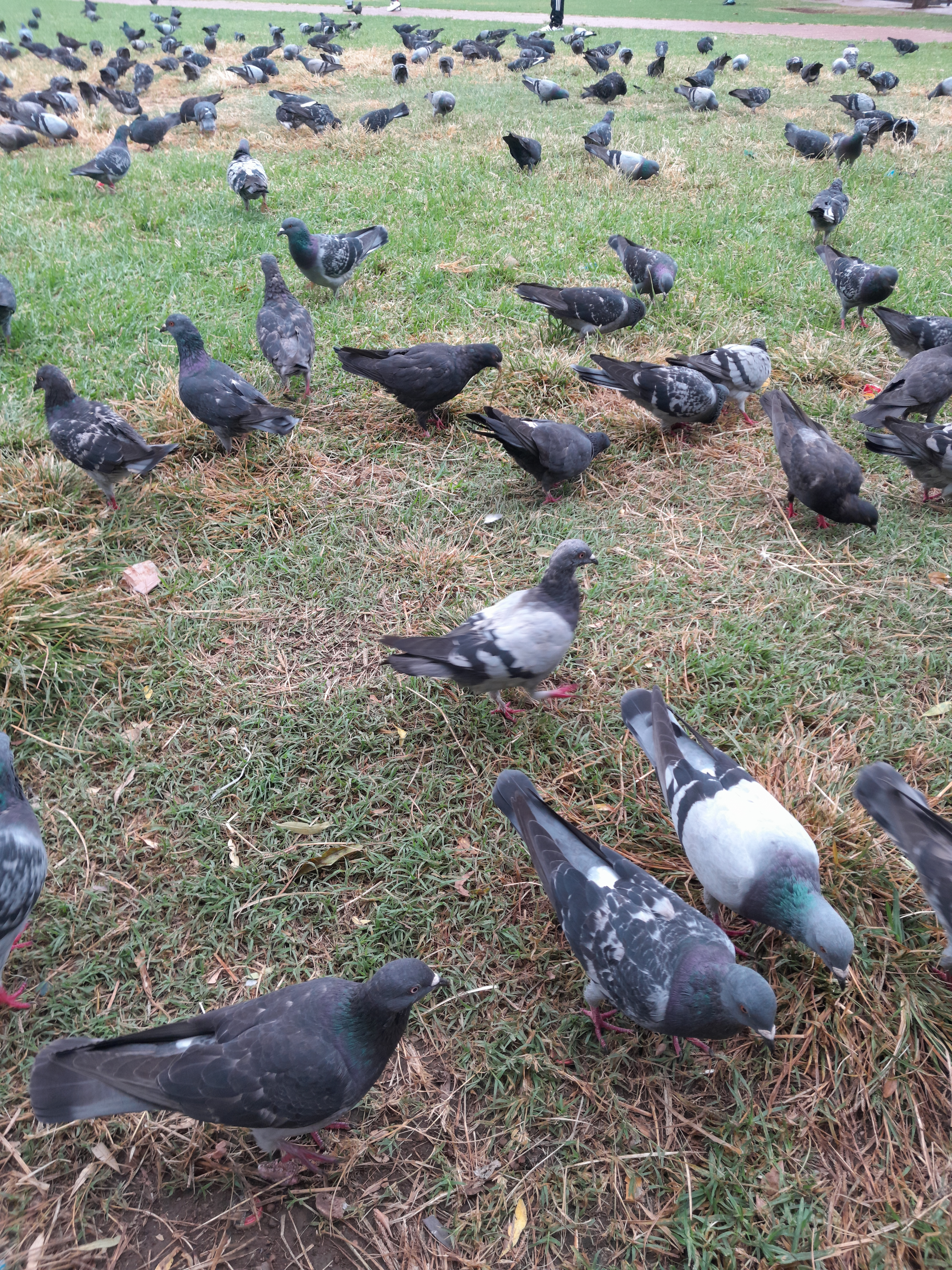
A large flock of feral pigeons.

Many domestic birds have escaped or been released over the years, and have given rise to the feral pigeon. As a result of inherited genetic variation, feral pigeons demonstrate a wide variety of plumage patterns and colours, ranging from closely resembling wild rock doves, to patterns directly inherited from their domestic ancestors. Over time a population tends to homogenise and adopt a plumage that suits their environment, such as camouflaging against black asphalt, and birds that have distinct plumage patterns from flockmates are more often targeted by predators. The scarcity of the pure wild species is partly due to interbreeding with feral birds. Domestic pigeons can often be distinguished from feral pigeons because they usually have a numbered metal or plastic ring around one, or sometimes both, legs which shows that they are registered to an owner.

Feral pigeons bear close genetic resemblance to homing pigeons, supporting the idea that most feral pigeons trace their origins to homing pigeons who did not find their way home, or were otherwise sired by homing pigeons. The large numbers of birds released in pigeon races and loft owners breaking down their lofts and leaving the pigeons to fend for themselves may be a significant factor in the persistence of urban pigeons. Ferals started to become maligned in the 1930s-40s, culminating when New York City parks commissioner Thomas coined the term "rats with wings" in June 1966.
