= Danish Tumbler =

Breed of pigeon

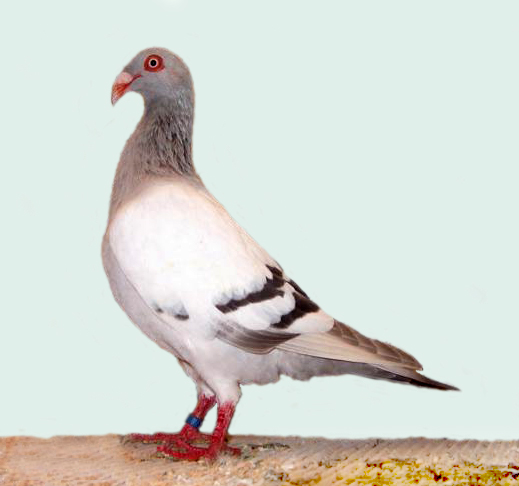
silver barred

The Danish Tumbler is a breed of fancy pigeon. Along with all other varieties of domesticated pigeons, Danish tumblers are rock pigeons (Columba livia). They can be dated as a specific domesticated breed back to 1764 in the city of Copenhagen. They were originally noted as flying performers, but now as known as show breeds. Apart from Denmark the Danish Tumbler is bred in good quality and large numbers in Norway, Germany and the Netherlands. It is virtually unknown in America. The standard of the Danish Tumbler: Figure: Elegant, slender and rather strong with highly carried, full breast; The neck: comparatively long. The throat well undercut; The uppermost part of the neck slender and thin, evenly growing in thickness down towards breast and back; The back: suitably broad-shouldered, in parade position sloping (ab. 50° with horizontal) down towards the narrow, not too long tail; The wings shall be fit closely to the body, rest upon the tail and almost reach the tip of the tail without crossing each other; The tail shall consist of 12 feathers, be narrow and tight fitting and must not reach the floor in parade position; The legs shall be red, comparatively long, not coarse, not too close, slightly bent in the heel. The lower legs shall be comparatively long; The plumage shall be thick and firm; the wing feathers strong;

The form of the head seen from the side, shall shape a regular evenly curved line, which without breaking or contraction at the root of the beak passes into the strongly set, slightly downwards turned, cone shaped beak; The front of the head must not be too short; the back of the head shall be shortly rounded; The head in front view, shall be wedge-shaped, without edges and contractions and evenly curved to the sides.

The beak: the upper mandible as well as the lower mandible shall be strongly set, evenly falling off in thickness from root to tip; Too strongly pronounced "hook" (tip of the mandible) not desirable. The line through the corner of the mouth shall have direction towards the center of the eye; The color of the beak shall be bright, lightly rose pink and without "grain". For blacks and blues, however, a not too strongly pronounced "grain" on the upper mandible is allowed; The beak warts shall be prettily reddish-white and not coarse.

When viewed from the side, the eyes should be positioned centrally on the head. They should be large, bright, and lively, with a clear, milky-white appearance, free from any visible red veins. The pupils should be small, round, and black, while the eye rims should be narrow, vibrant, and reddish in colour.

The color:

- The black shall be deep with reddish metallic luster on the cheeks, neck and upper breast
- The red color shall be deep, with reddish metallic luster on cheeks, neck and upper breast
- The yellow color shall be bright, with faintly reddish silky metallic luster on neck and breast
- The blue color shall be deep and bright, with greenish metallic luster on neck and breast
- The pearl color (pearl blue) shall be light and bright mother-of-pearl color (silver white), with faintly greenish metallic luster on neck and breast

The markings:

- Self in black, white, red, yellow, blue barless
- Self groused in black, white, red, yellow and blue barless
- Barred in blue, red, yellow and pearl
- Barred grouse in blue and pearl
- Chequered in blue
- Magpie in black, red, yellow, blue and pearl
- Tigered in black, red, yellow, blue and pearl
- White flighted in black, red, yellow, blue and pearl
- White tailed in black, red, yellow, blue and pearl
- White flighted white tailed in black, red, yellow, blue and pearl
- Helmet in black, red, yellow, blue and pearl
- Stipper in grey, yellow and brown
- Groused Stipper in grey, yellow and brown
- Branders in dark and tigered
- White shield in red and yellow
- Colour shield in black

== See also ==
- List of pigeon breeds
