= Ghent Cropper =

Breed of pigeon

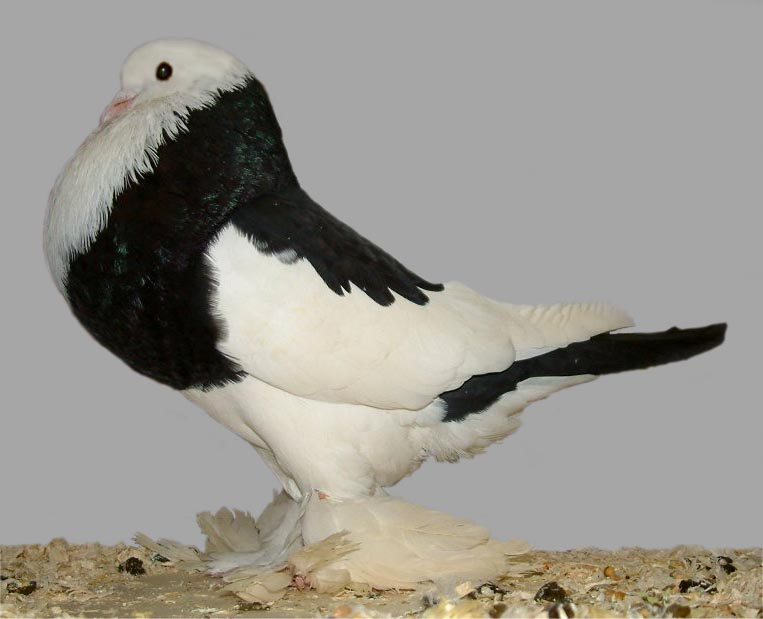
- Ghent Cropper
- Conservation status: Common

Traits
- Feather ornamentation: foot feathering

Classification
- Australian Breed Group: Group 5 Cropper
- US Breed Group: Pouter Cropper
- EE Breed Group: Pouter/Cropper (B/309)

The Ghent Cropper is a breed of fancy pigeon developed over many years of selective breeding. Ghent Croppers, along with other varieties of domesticated pigeons, are all descendants from the rock pigeon (Columba livia).

== Gallery ==
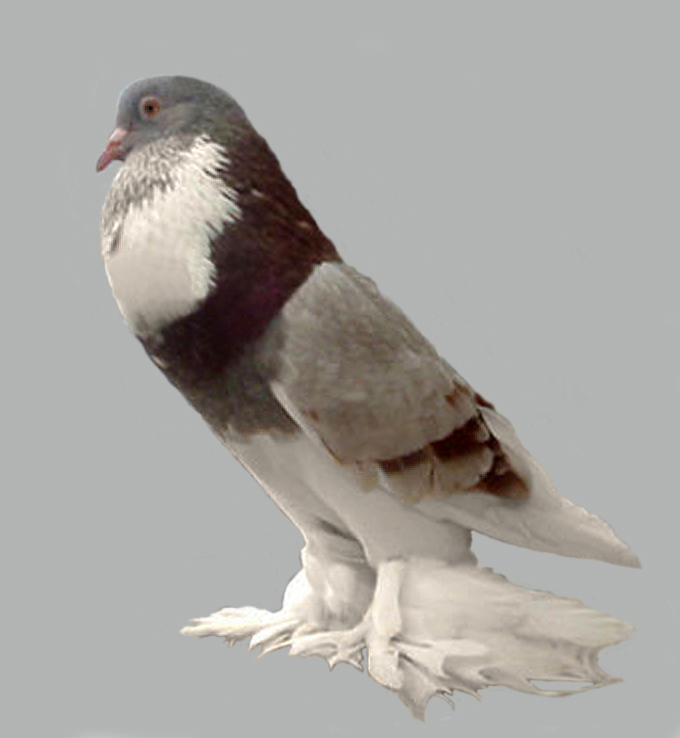
Red bar (Mealie)

== See also ==
- Pigeon Diet
- Pigeon Housing
- List of pigeon breeds
- American Pigeon Journal
