= Dutch Beauty Homer =

Breed of pigeon

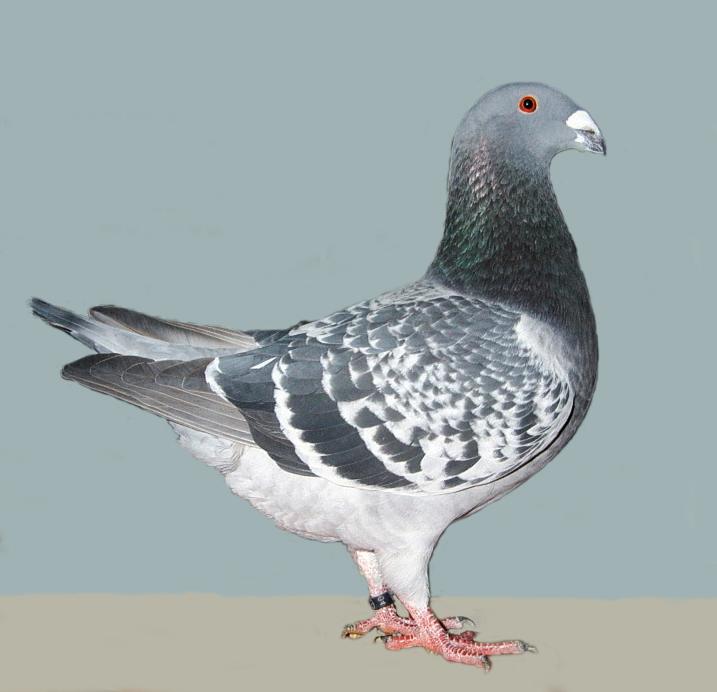
Dutch Beauty Homer

The Dutch Beauty Homer is a breed of fancy pigeon. Dutch Beauty Homers, along with other varieties of domesticated pigeons, are all descendants from the rock pigeon (Columba livia). This breed of pigeon is known for their characteristic grey feathers and red eyes. They emit a cooing noise typical of most pigeon species. The Dutch Beauty Homer is most famous for its use as mail carriers during World War II. In the modern era, Dutch Beauty Homer pigeons are collected and most notably seen in bird beauty pageant shows, where they are judged on plumage, shape, and general health.

== See also ==
- List of pigeon breeds
