= Old Dutch Tumbler =

Breed of pigeon

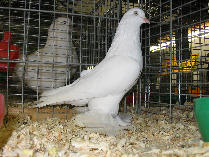
- Conservation status: Common
- Country of origin: Netherlands

Classification
- US Breed Group: Fancy
- EE Breed Group: Tumbler Pigeons

The Old Dutch Tumbler is a breed of fancy pigeon developed over many years of selective breeding. Old Dutch Tumblers, along with other varieties of domesticated pigeons, are all descendants from the rock pigeon (Columba livia).

== Gallery ==
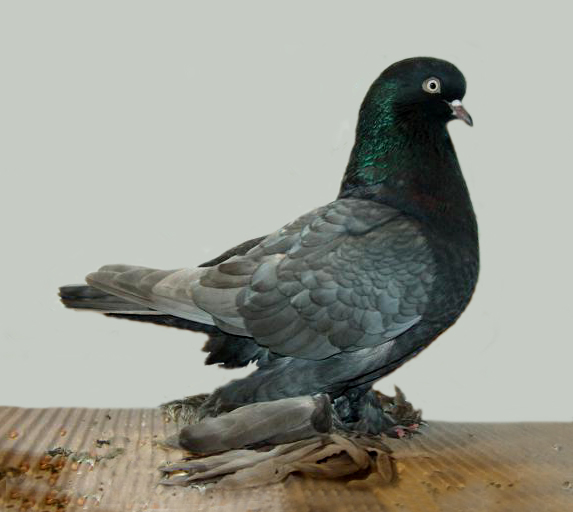
Andalusian

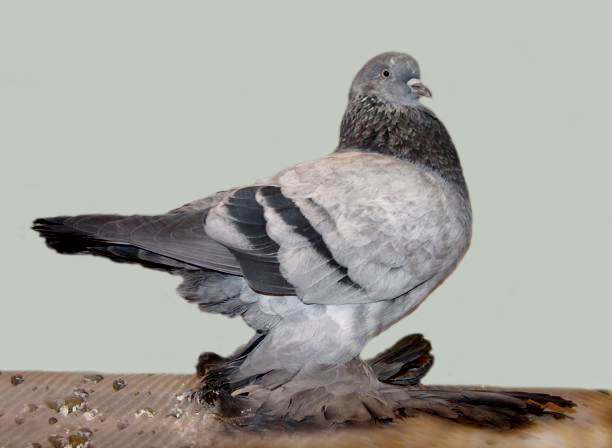
Blue grizzle

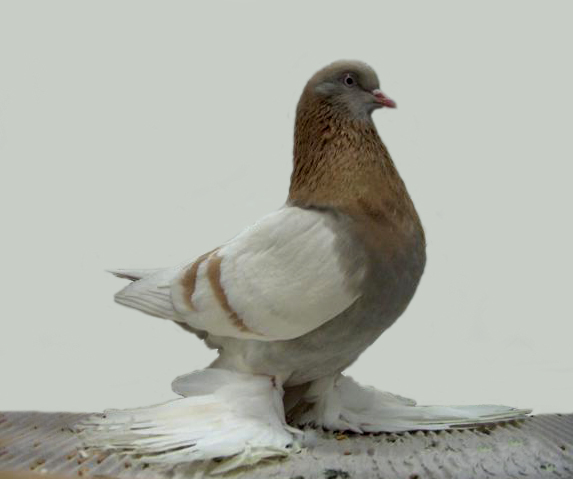
Cream bar

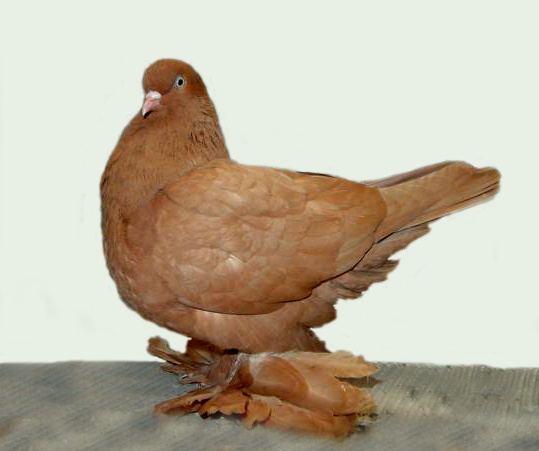
Yellow

== See also ==
- Pigeon Diet
- Pigeon Housing
- List of pigeon breeds
