= Pouter =

Pigeon breed group

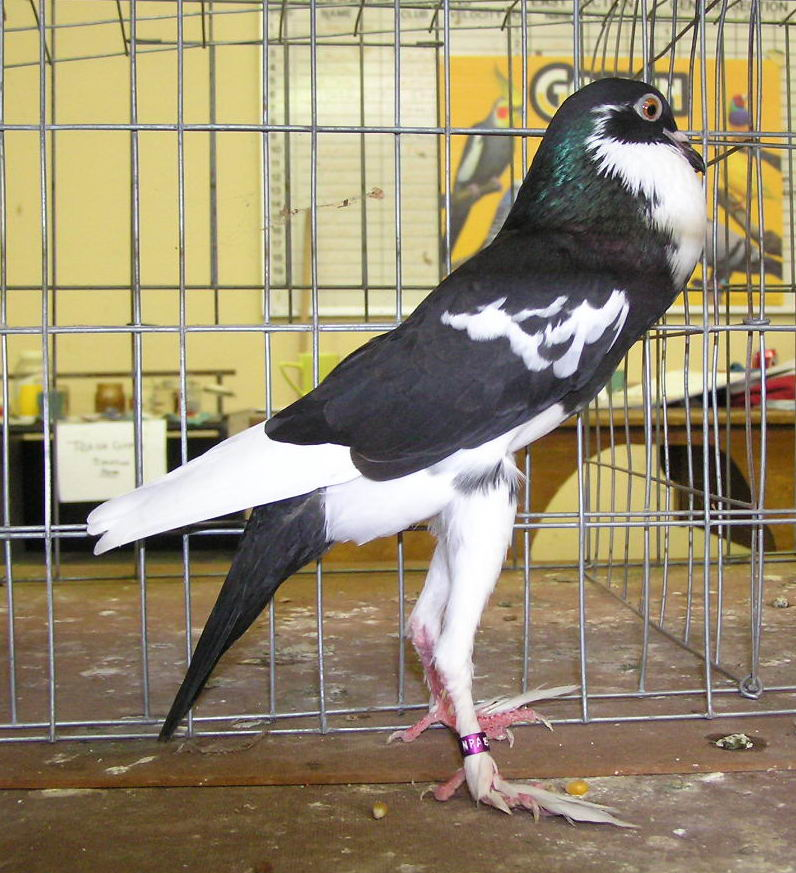
A Pigmy Pouter

The Pouter or Cropper pigeons are domesticated varieties of the rock dove, Columba livia, characterized by a very large, inflatable crop. They are kept as ornamental or fancy breeds, valued for their unusual appearance. There are many varieties of pouter with little in common except for the nature of the crop. The origin of the breed group is unknown, but Pouters have been bred in Europe for at least 400 years.

== Common varieties ==
- Brunner Pouter
- Dutch Cropper
- Elster Cropper
- English Pouter
- Gaditano Pouter
- Ghent Cropper
- Granadino Pouter
- Holle Cropper
- Horseman Thief Pouter
- Marchenero Pouter
- Norwich Cropper
- Old German Cropper
- Parisian Pouter
- Pigmy Pouter
- Pomeranian Pouter
- Reverse-wing Pouter
- Uploper
- Voorburg Shield Cropper

== See also ==
- List of pigeon breeds
