= Voorburg Shield Cropper =

Breed of pigeon

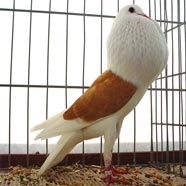
- Country of origin: Netherlands

Classification
- Australian Breed Group: Pouter & Croppers
- US Breed Group: Pouter & Croppers
- EE Breed Group: Pouter & Croppers

Notes
- Known for friendly disposition

The Voorburg Shield Cropper is a breed of fancy pigeon developed over many years of selective breeding. Being domesticated pigeons, Voorburg Shield Croppers are descendants of the rock dove (Columba livia). This breed was developed by C.S. Theodore Van Gink at Voorburg in the Netherlands in 1935. "Shield" refers to the wing shields, the covert feathers covering the wings, which according to the standard, are the only pigmented feathers visible on an alighted bird. Their enlarged necks, referred to as a "globe", is actually a crop that is inflated; all pigeons inflate their crops to vocalize (coo), but croppers and pouters maintain the inflation of their crops due to a behavioral quirk selected through artificial selection.

Their NPA standard for their behavior reads:

Unconstrained, smooth and frolicsome, with a lively bump of curiosity, it stands and moves in an upright position with the eyes directly over the center of the feet. When courting, the cock spreads its tail in a fan-like manner and moves in a hopping motion; the hen, when flirting,, may behave similarly. In flight, both sexes clap their wings above their backs. The Voorburg Shield Cropper is a very friendly, animated pigeon that is quite responsive to human voices and attention. In show condition, it should give a constant, active performance.

—

Due to being the standard, the breed is well known for its friendliness to humans, its lively mannerisms, and affectionate nature. During showing, the birds "should give a constant, active performance" to the judges, which is the same display they would perform in courtship towards other pigeons.

== Gallery ==
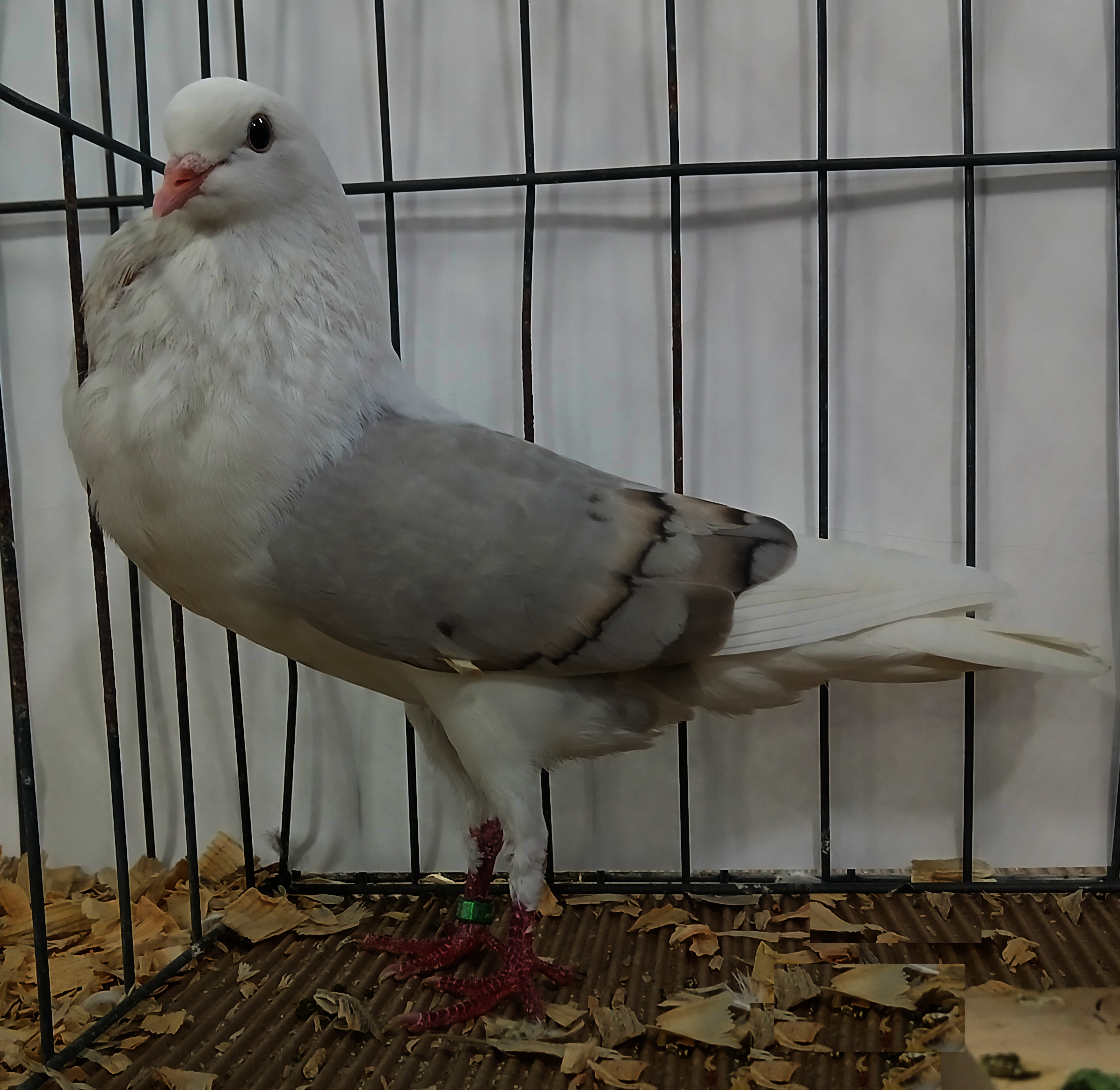

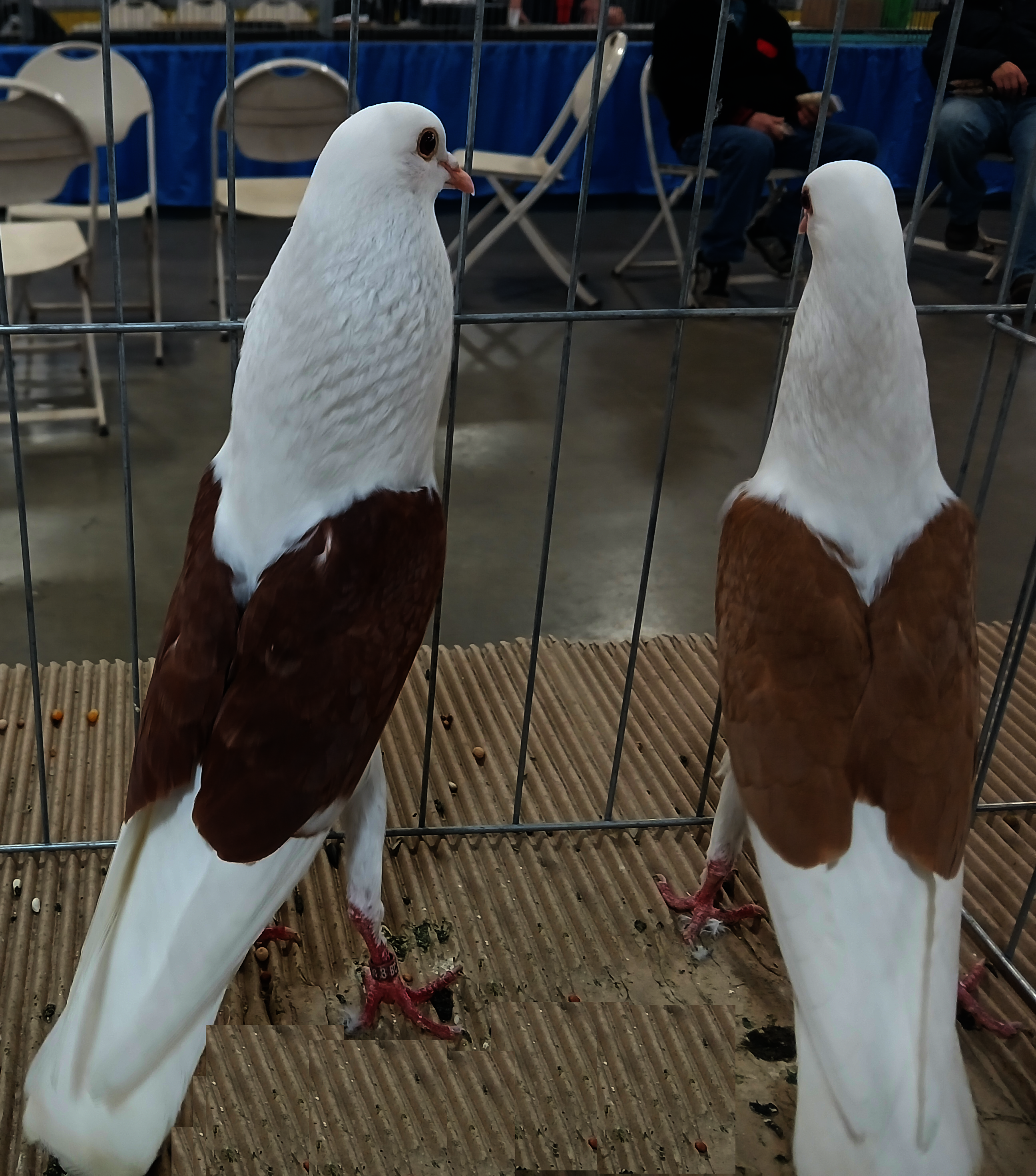

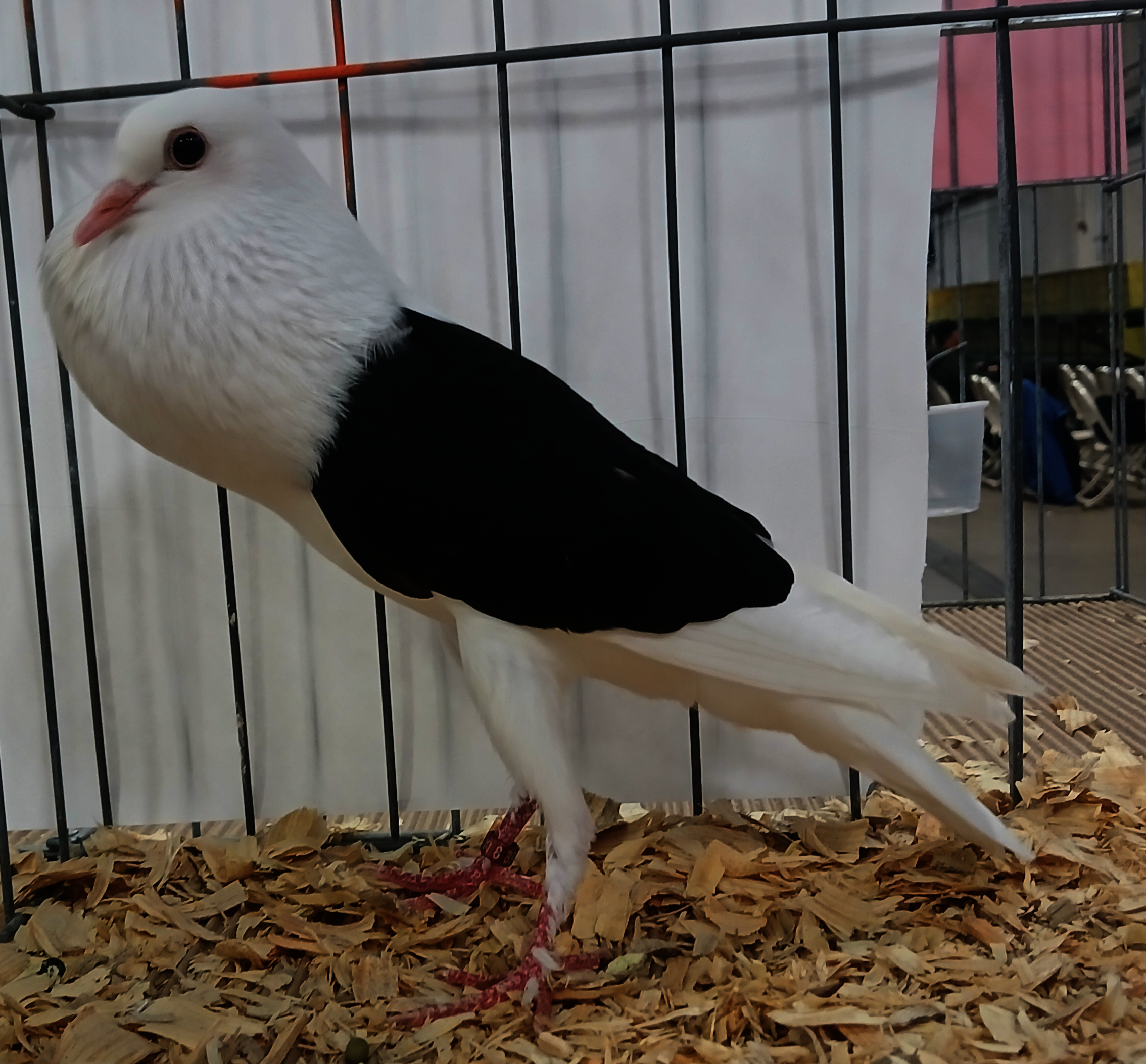

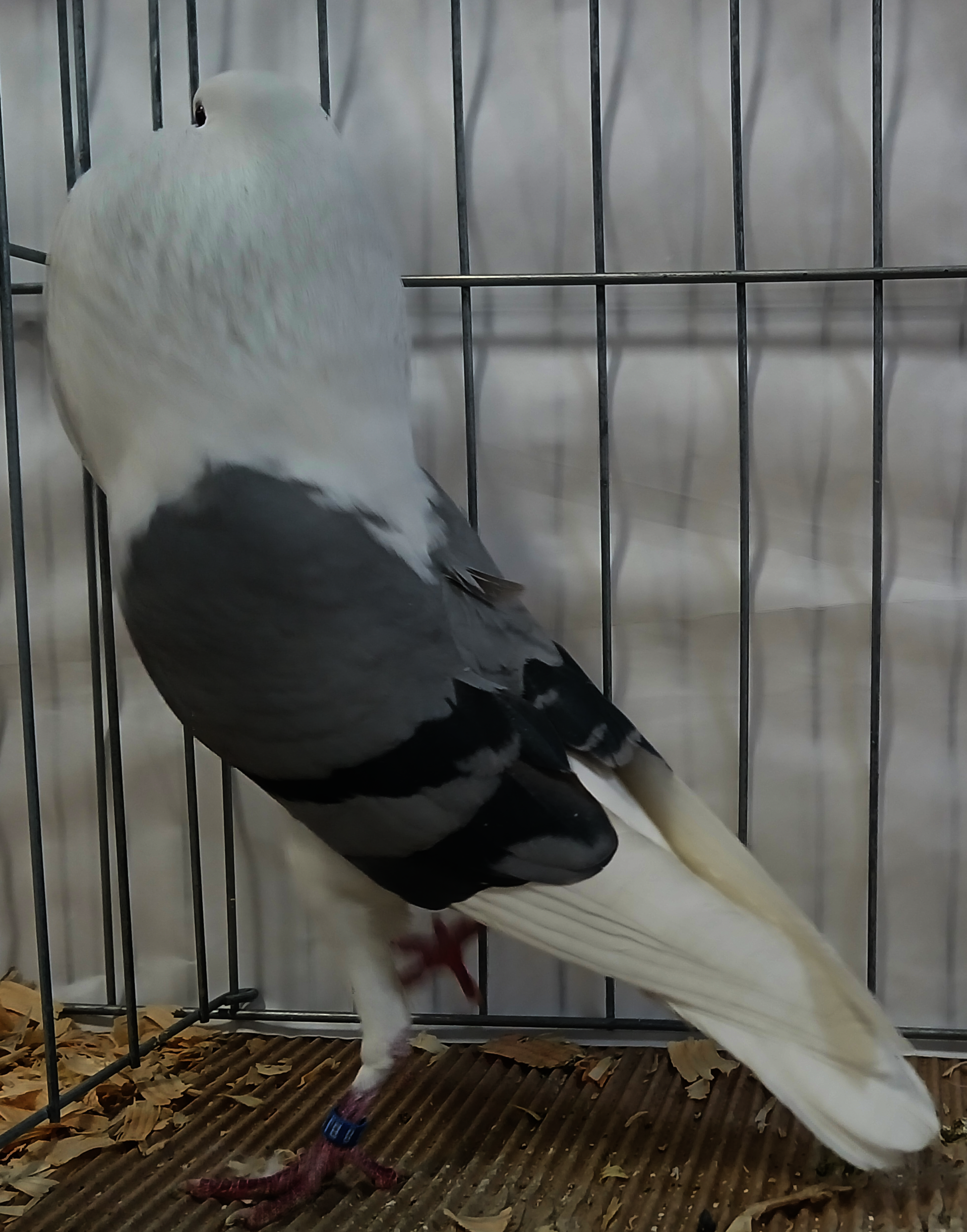

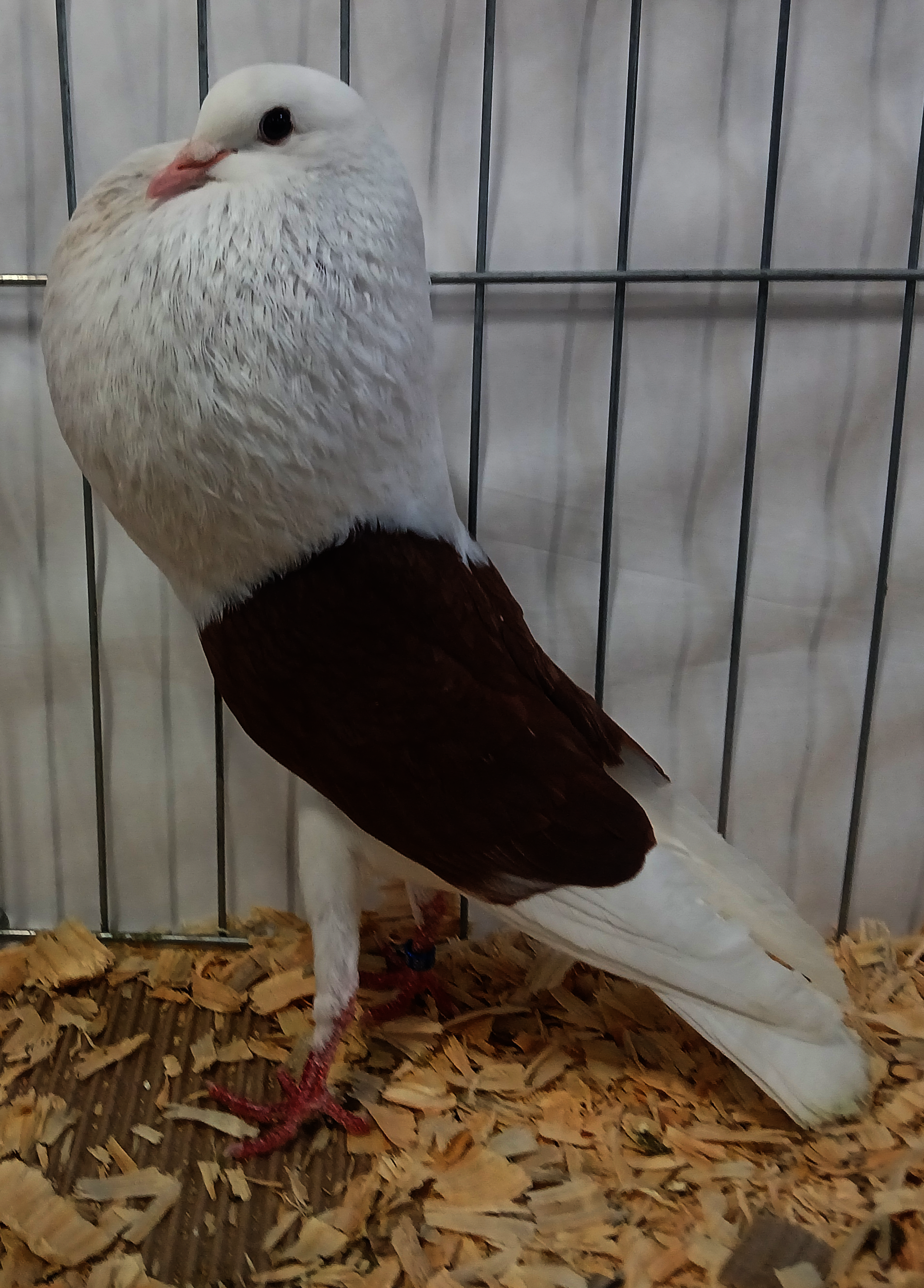

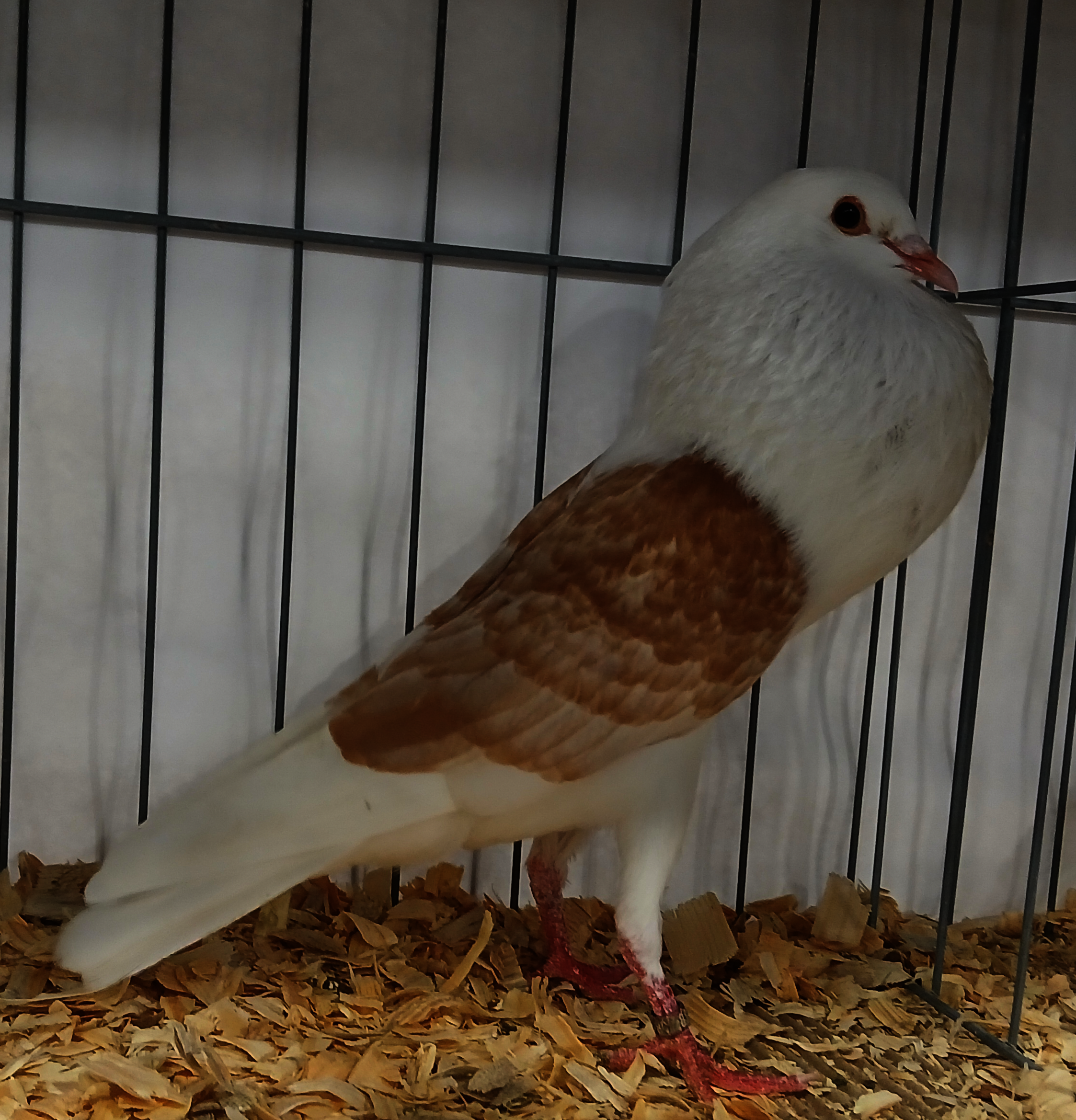

== See also ==
- Pigeon Diet
- Pigeon Housing
- List of pigeon breeds
