= American bohemian pouter =

Breed of pigeon

American Bohemian Pouter
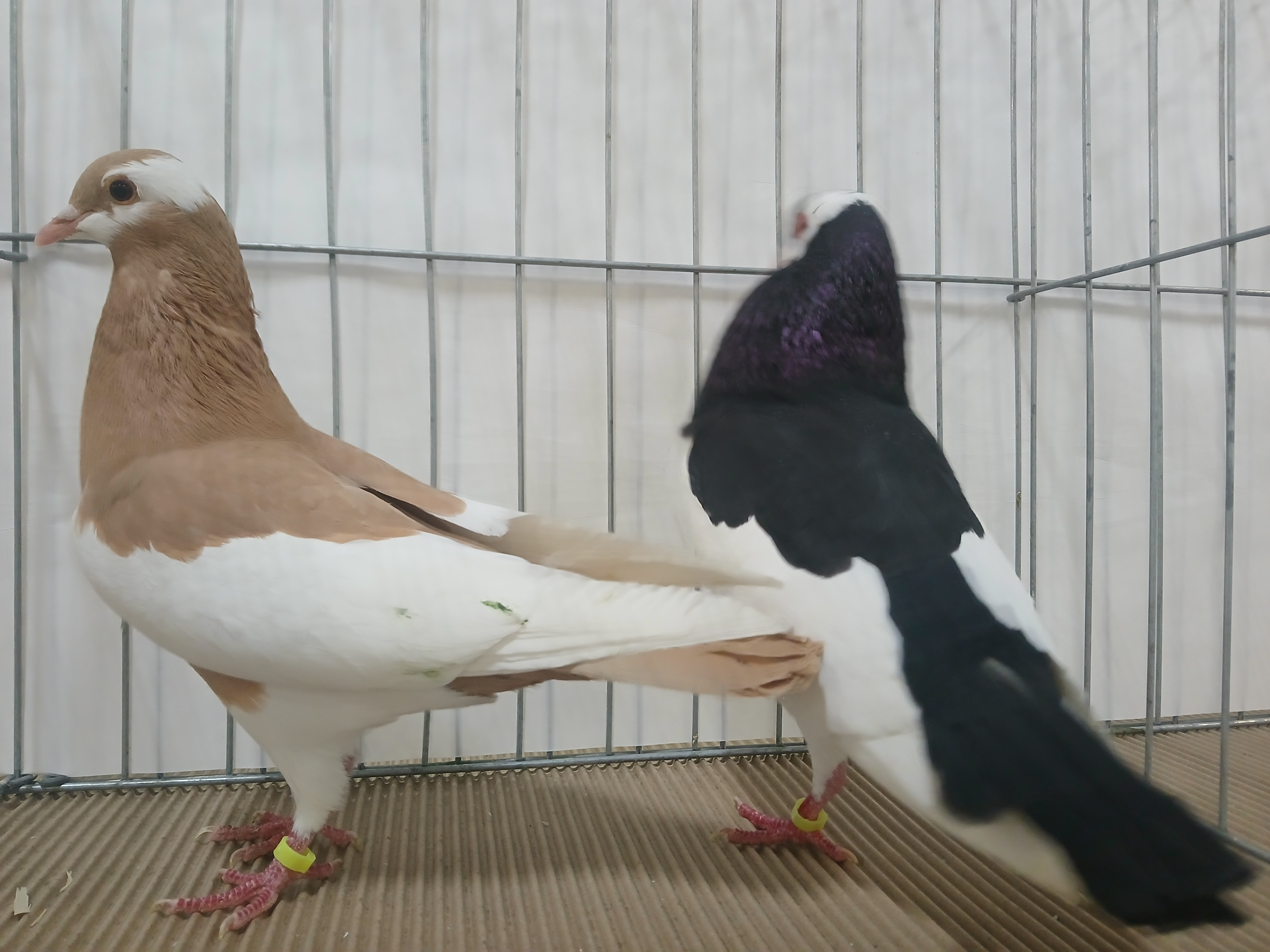
- shown at NPA National
- Conservation status: rare
- Country of origin: U.S.
- Distribution: U.S.
- Standard: yes
- Type: Show
- Use: Exhibition Pouter/Cropper

Traits
- Color: all colors
- Lifespan: 12 years
- weight: 20oz, 567 g
- size: 16 inches, 40cm
- marking: Magpied
- eye color: bull
- head: round

Classification
- Australian: not listed
- European: not listed
- US: Pouters and Croppers

Notes
- Breed was derived from the Steller Pouter

The American Bohemian Pouter is the only American pouter/cropper breed recognized in the U.S. by the National Pigeon Association. It was developed, formed and shaped, primarily in Minnesota. As with all domesticated pigeons, it is derived from the rock dove (Columba livia), being further developed using selective breeding techniques.

== Origin ==
The American Bohemian Pouter Pigeon traces its roots back to Europe, with its most direct antecedents being the Steller or Stavak Pouters of Germany and Czechoslovakia, where they were first bred for their unique body shape and elegant posture. German and Czech immigrants brought them to their farms in the U.S. over 140 years ago. Reverse-wing and Norwich Croppers were also used in the creation of the American Bohemian Pouter to increase size

Thanks to the dedication of breeders, the Bohemian Pouter was recognized by the National Pigeon Association as a new breed in 1994 because of its unique form. The breeders involved included Herb Berg, Vince Bednar, Merle Frank, Angela Wengert, Roger Steinbruckner, Bob Kosek, Walt Meidl, Dennis Streeter, Howard Kinsley, Richard Wiggins and Tina Rupert.

== Description ==
The American Bohemian Pouter is a medium size pigeon, yet larger than the Steller Pouter. The bib of contrasting colored feathers below the beak is smaller than the Steller Pouter's. It stands tall, more than a foot in height, on long legs set to the back. It stands in a nearly vertical position. The birds are pearl eyed and ganzel marked (magpie), with some having a colored spot on the top of the head. The crop, when fully inflated, gives a pear shaped balloon chest. Its body is slender but strong, with a smooth curve from the chest to the tail. The feathers are tight and shiny, coming in many rich colors. The beak and toe nails are horn colored. The bird’s wings rest neatly over its back, and the tail is narrow but well-shaped. To meet breed standards, the bird must show symmetry, a clean stance, and strong feather condition. While not specifically called for in the adopted standard of perfection, to encourage further development of the breed, should breeders desire to develop and show a crested type, the crested birds may be shown in their own class. However, any crest must be of a definite type.

The American Bohemian Pouter is an active but not aggressive bird in the loft, and has a soft cooing song that matches its friendly and calm personality. Many owners say their pouters enjoy gentle interaction with people and are curious about them.

== Distribution ==
The American Bohemian Pouter is limited to the United States. It has not been recognized in Europe, probably because of its resemblance to the Elster and Steller Pouters. The heyday of the breed was during the 1990s, after the American Pigeon Association formally recognized it as a distinct breed and The American Bohemian Pouter Club was established. The standard that was adopted was nearly identical to the working standard adopted by the original breeders in 1982. The supporting club has since been disbanded. Yet Bohemian Pouters were shown at the American Pigeon Association's National show in Oklahoma City in 2026.

== Gallery ==
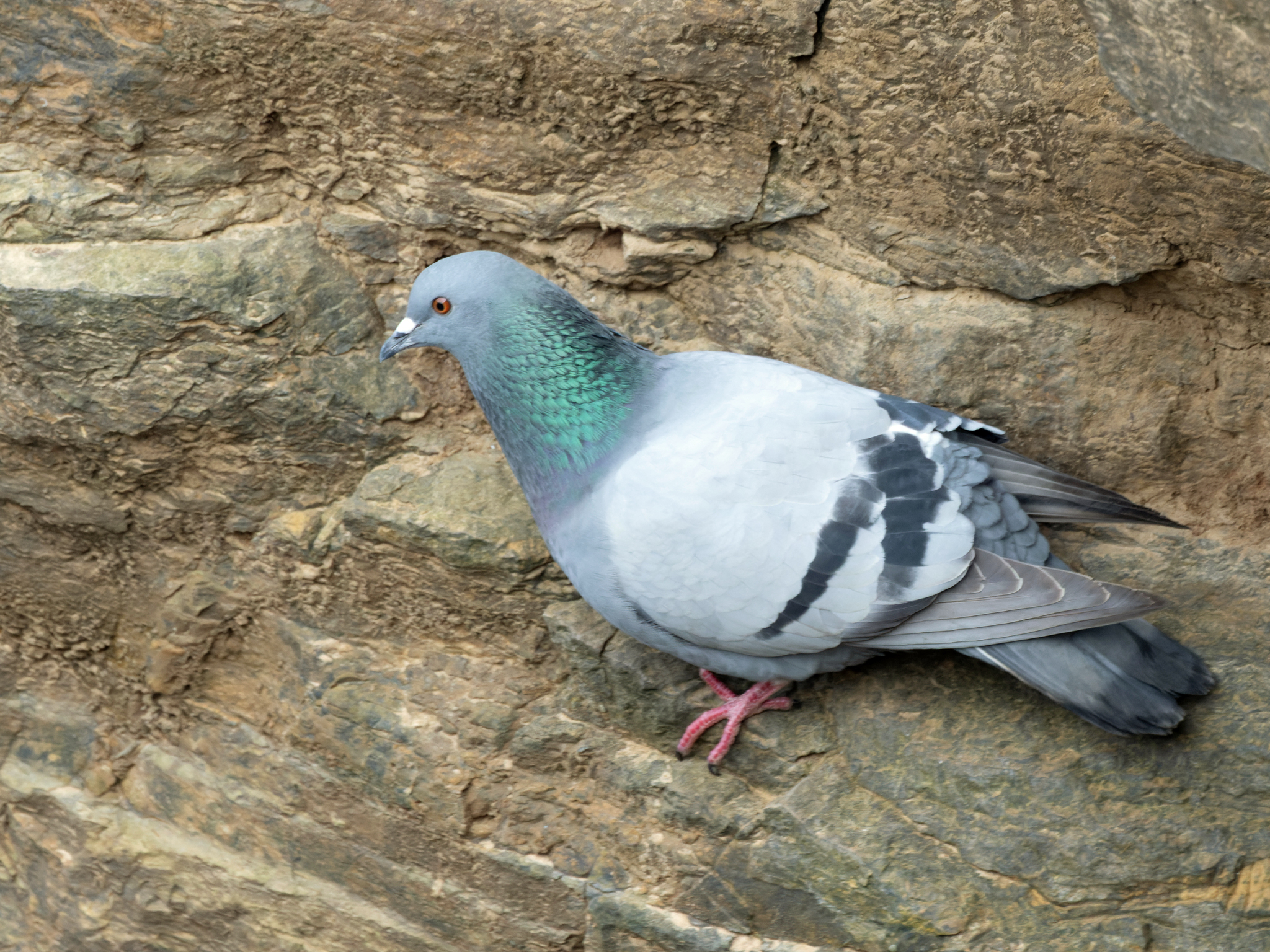
Rock Dove

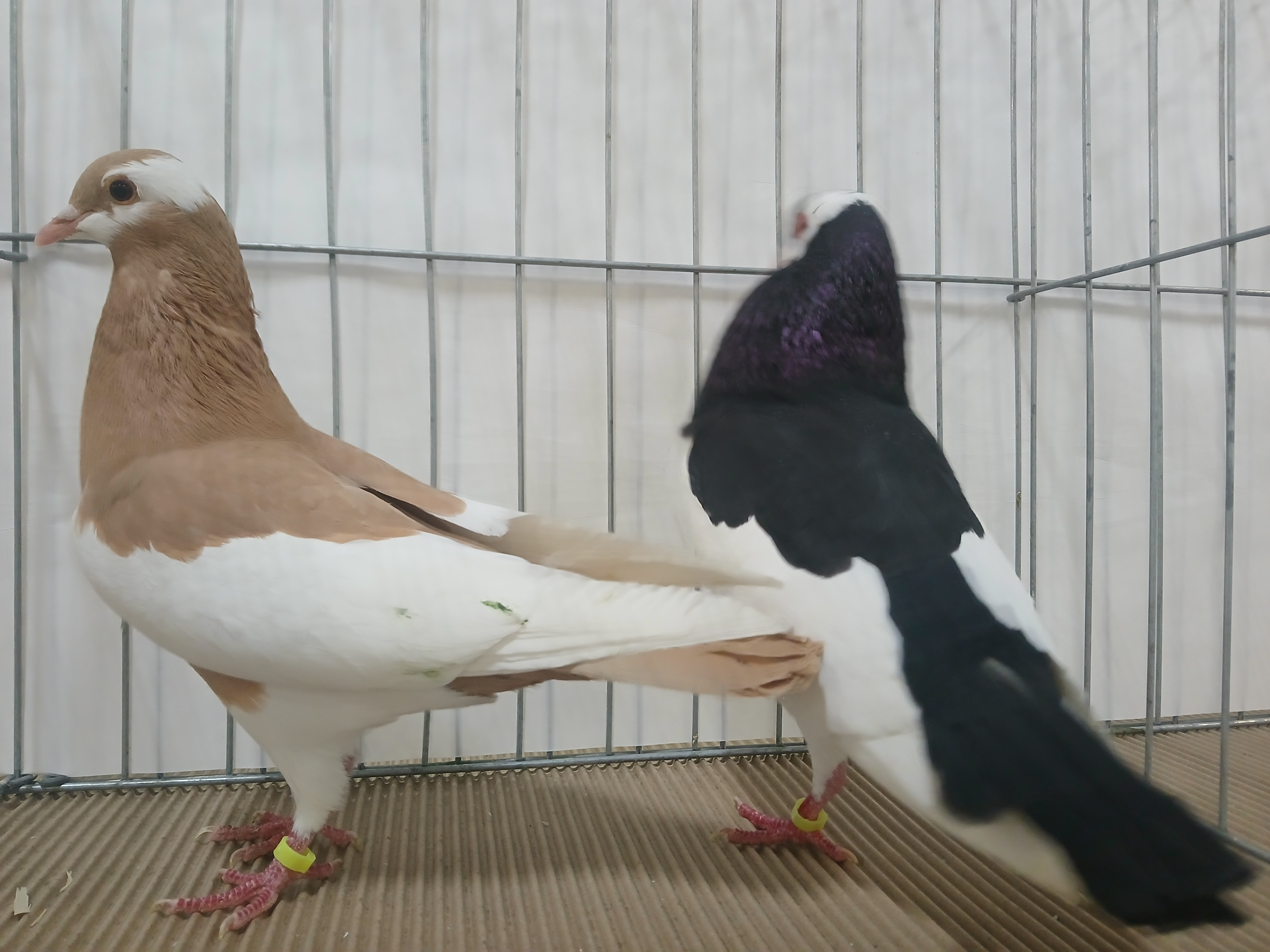
American Bohemian Pouters

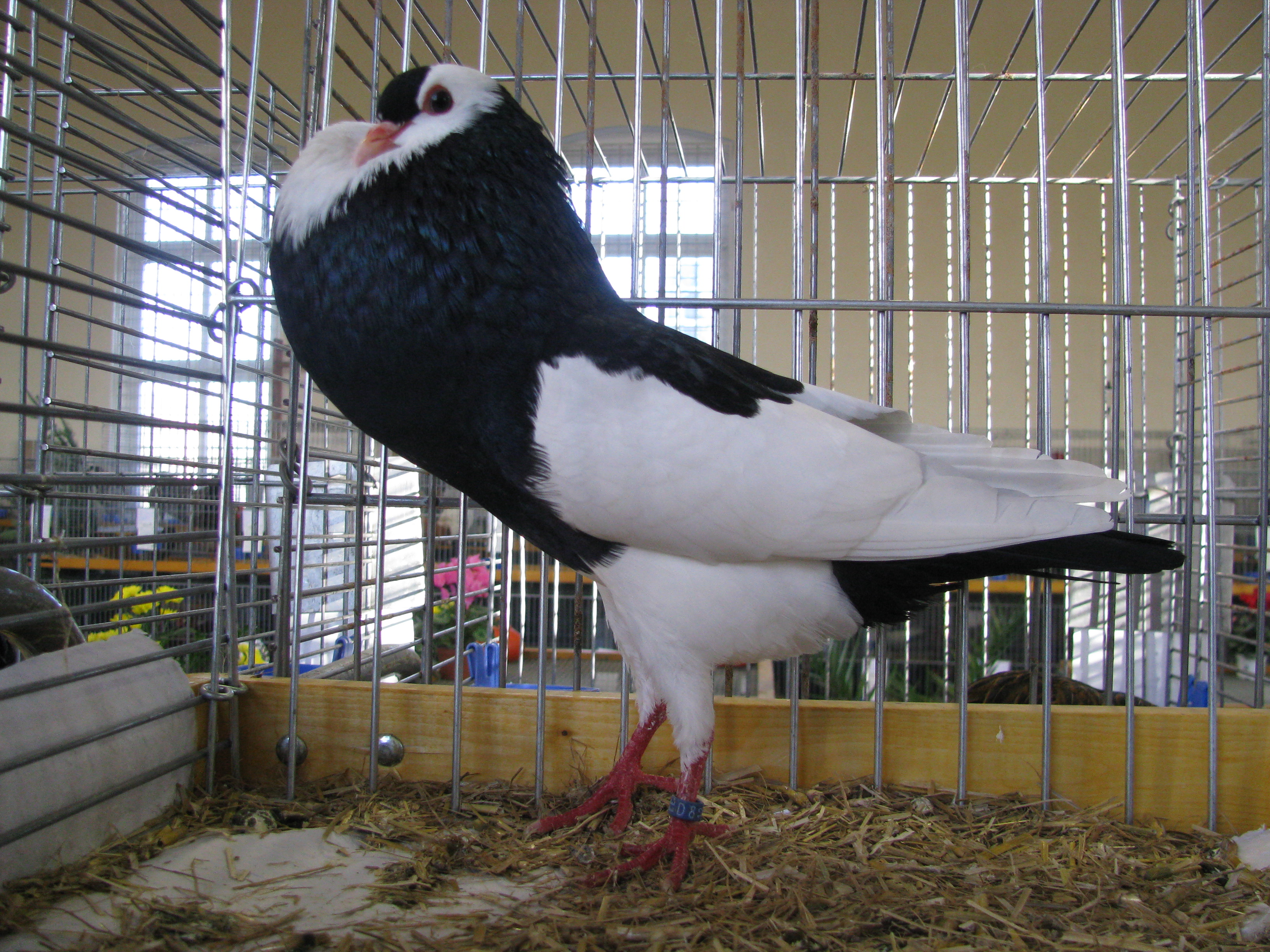
Steller

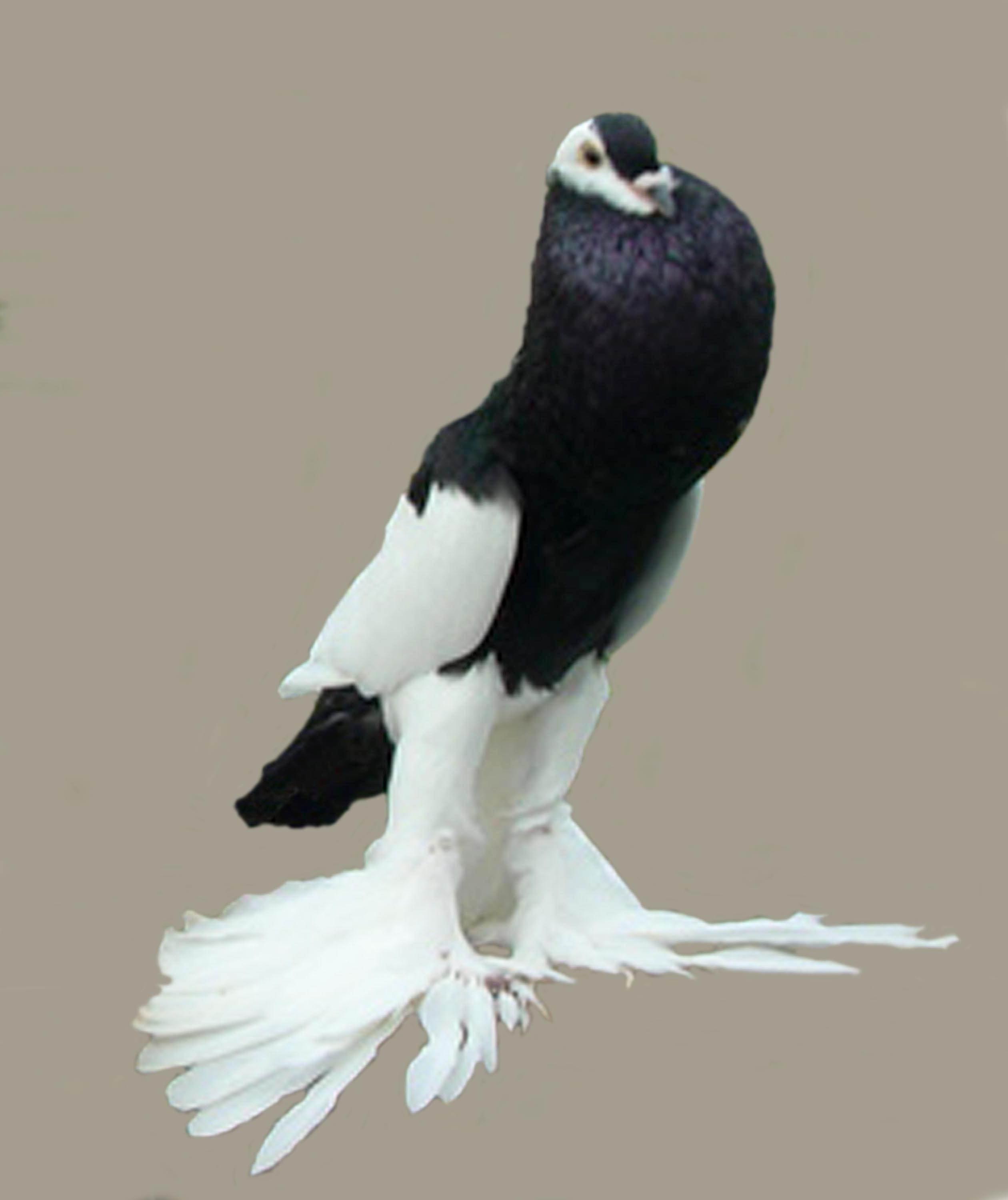
Reverse-wing Pouter

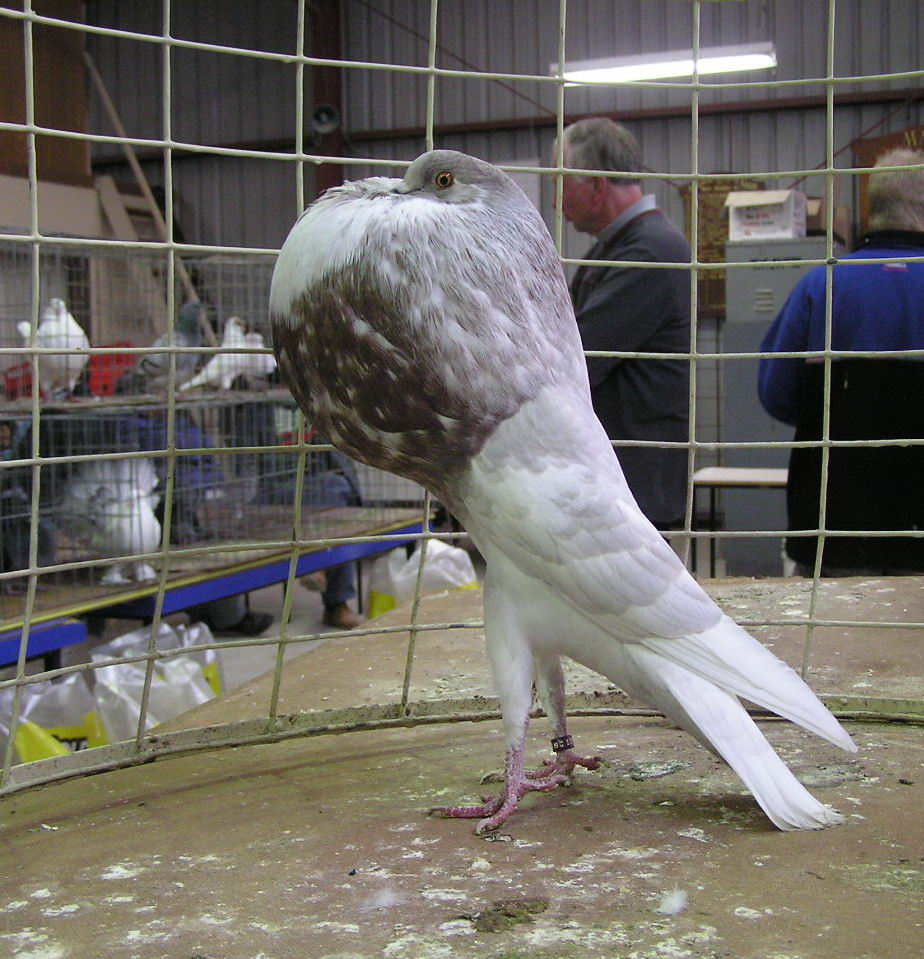
Norwich Cropper

== See also ==
- List of pigeon breeds
