= Aachen Cropper =

Breed of pigeon

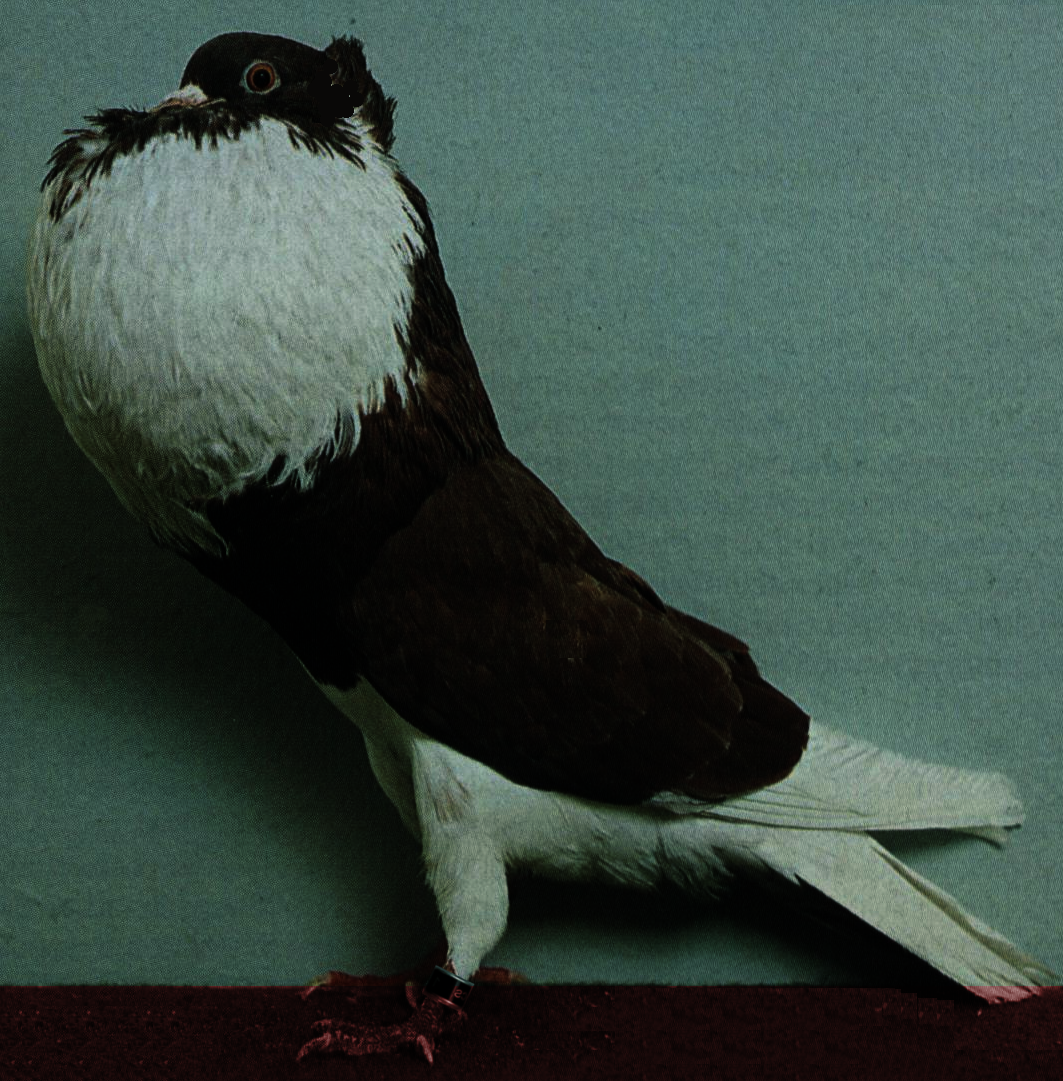
- Red
- Conservation status: Common
- Other names: Aachener Band Cropper
- Nicknames: "Blowers"
- Country of origin: Germany

Traits
- Crest type: Peak

Classification
- Australian Breed Group: None
- US Breed Group: Pouter
- EE Breed Group: Pouter/Cropper

Notes
- While common in Europe, the breed is rare in the US

The Aachen Cropper is a breed of fancy pigeon developed over many years of selective breeding. It was created in Aachen, Germany, during the early 1800s using the Belgian Ringbeater and the Thuringer Cropper. Aachen Croppers along with other breeds of domesticated pigeons are all descendants from the rock pigeon (Columba livia). There are several breeds of Cropper pigeons which are known for their enlarged crop .

== Characteristics ==
As with all Pouter/Cropper breeds it has an enlarged crop, known as the globe, and a small peak crest. It is only of medium size with an upright stance. The most unusual aspect for a pouter/cropper is the markings, being a shield marked with a colored peak crested head, but without rosettes.

colors
Black, blue, red and yellow, mealy, cream, isabel, in solid, barred and checkered.

== Basic Needs ==
- Pigeon Diet
- Pigeon Housing

== See also ==
- List of pigeon breeds
- "American Pigeon Journal" September 1957
