= Brunner Pouter =

Breed of pigeon

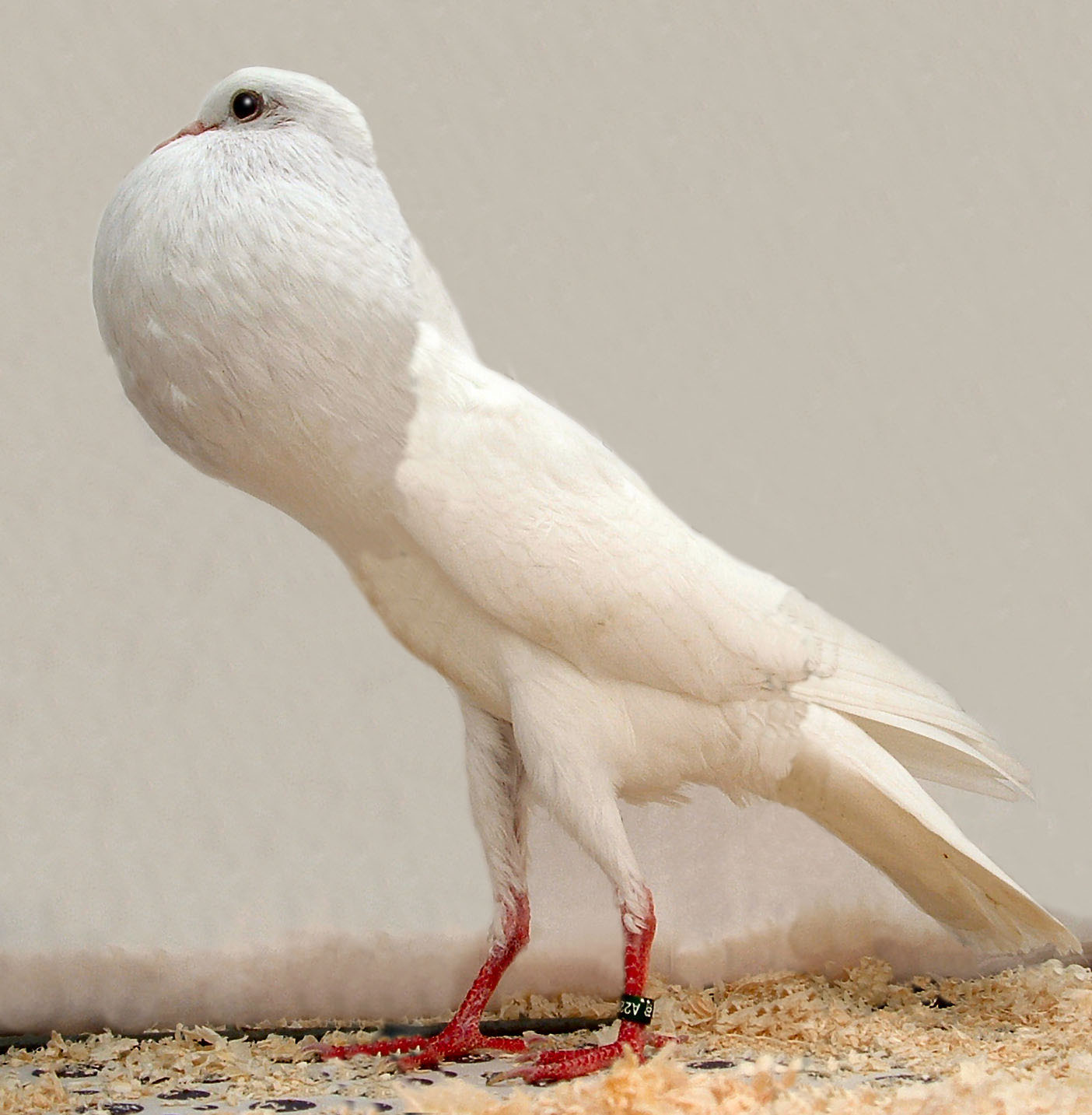
- Conservation status: Common

Classification
- US Breed Group: Fancy
- EE Breed Group: Pouter and Cropper

The Brunner Pouter is a breed of fancy pigeon developed over many years of selective breeding. Brunner Pouters along with other varieties of domesticated pigeons are all descendants from the rock pigeon (Columba livia). The breed is one of the most popular blower breeds.

== Gallery ==
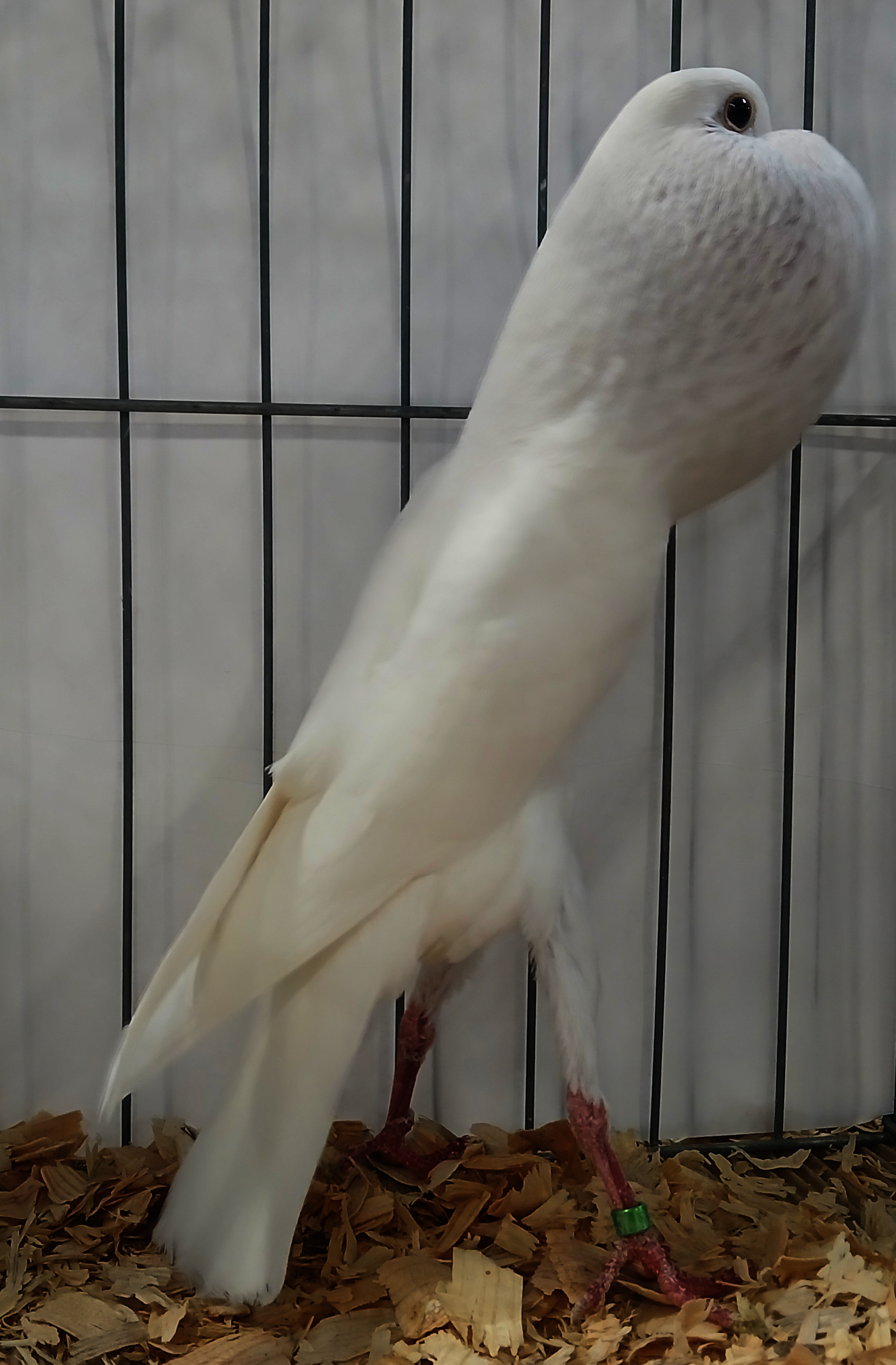
White

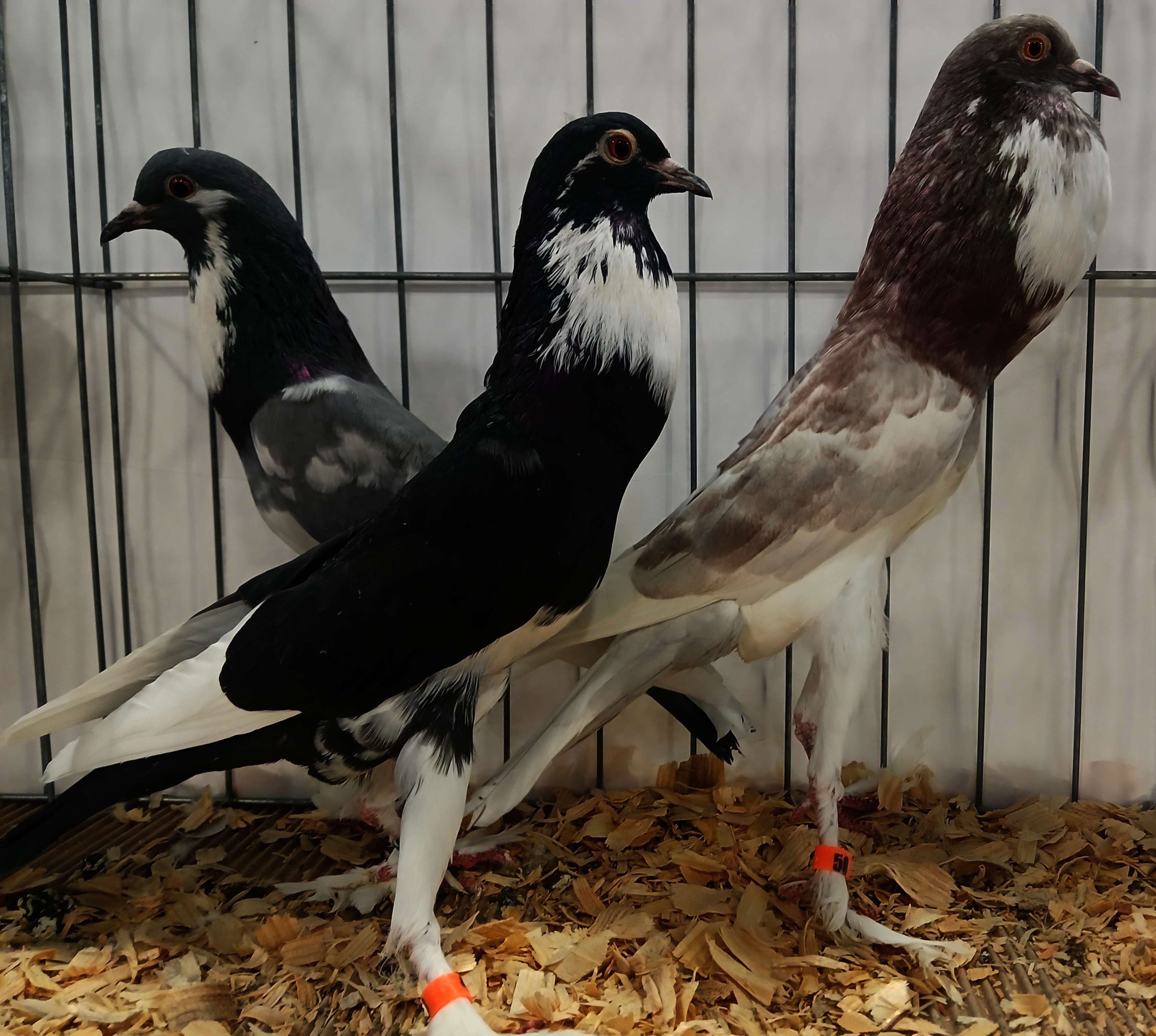
Group

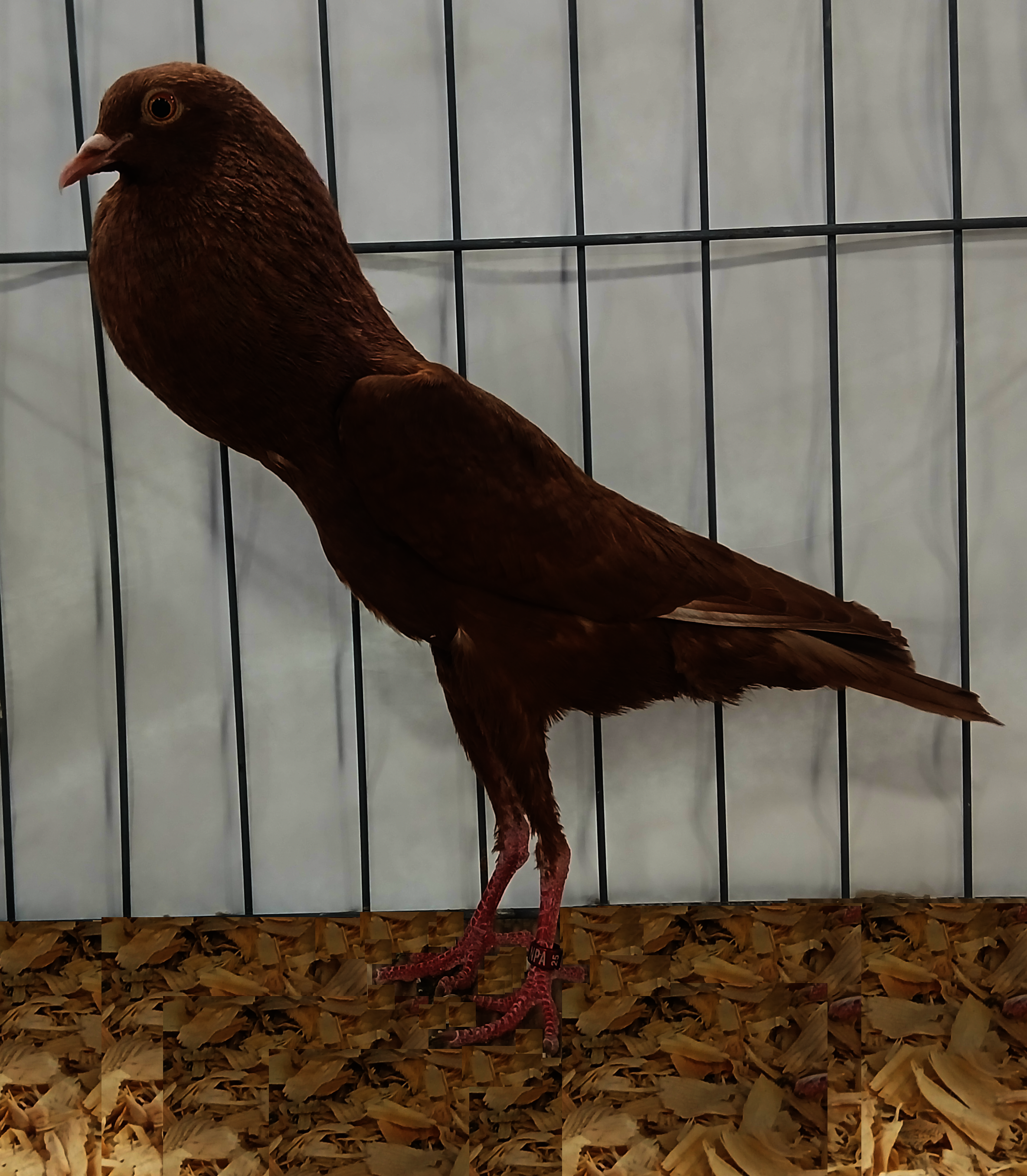
Red

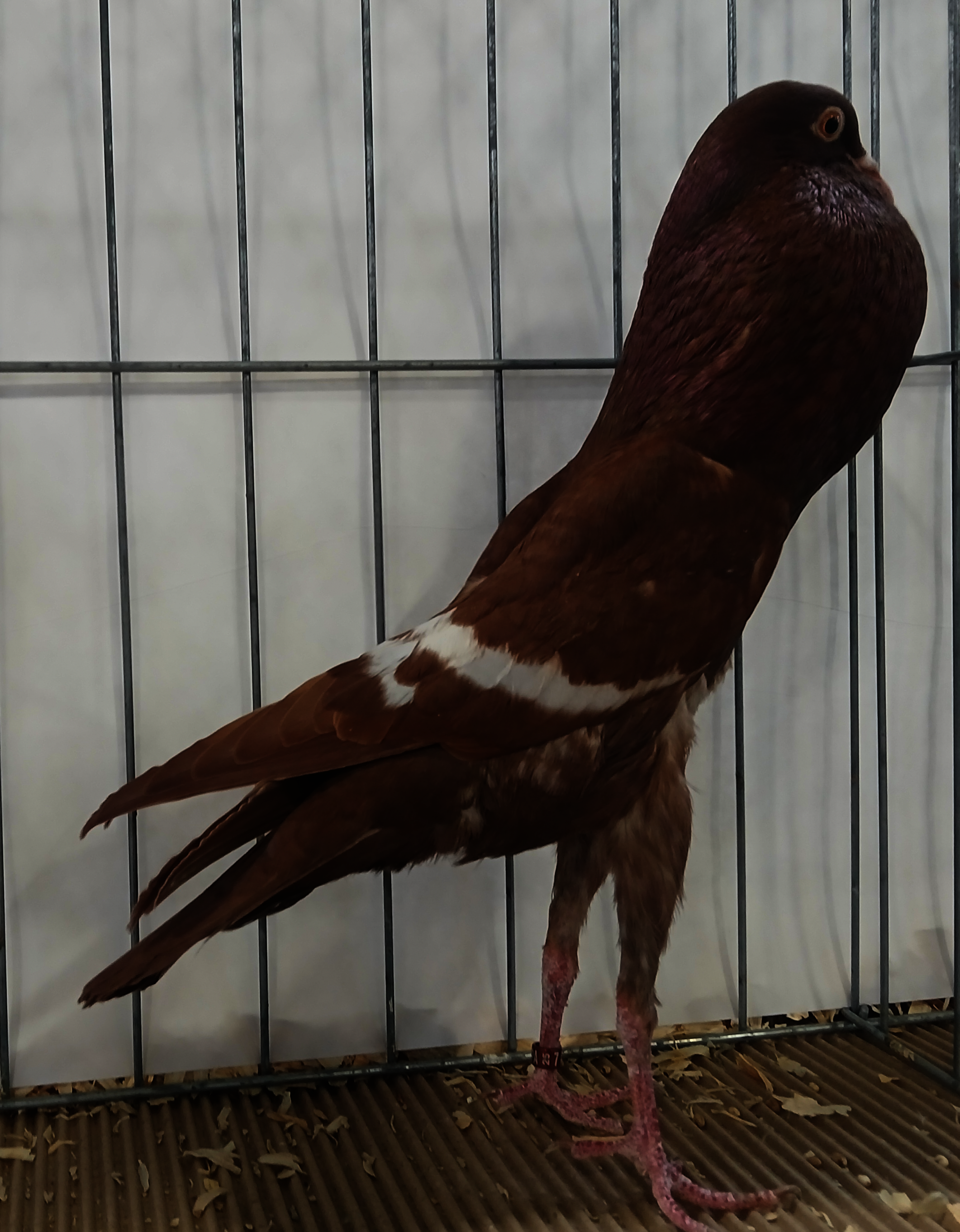
Red white bar

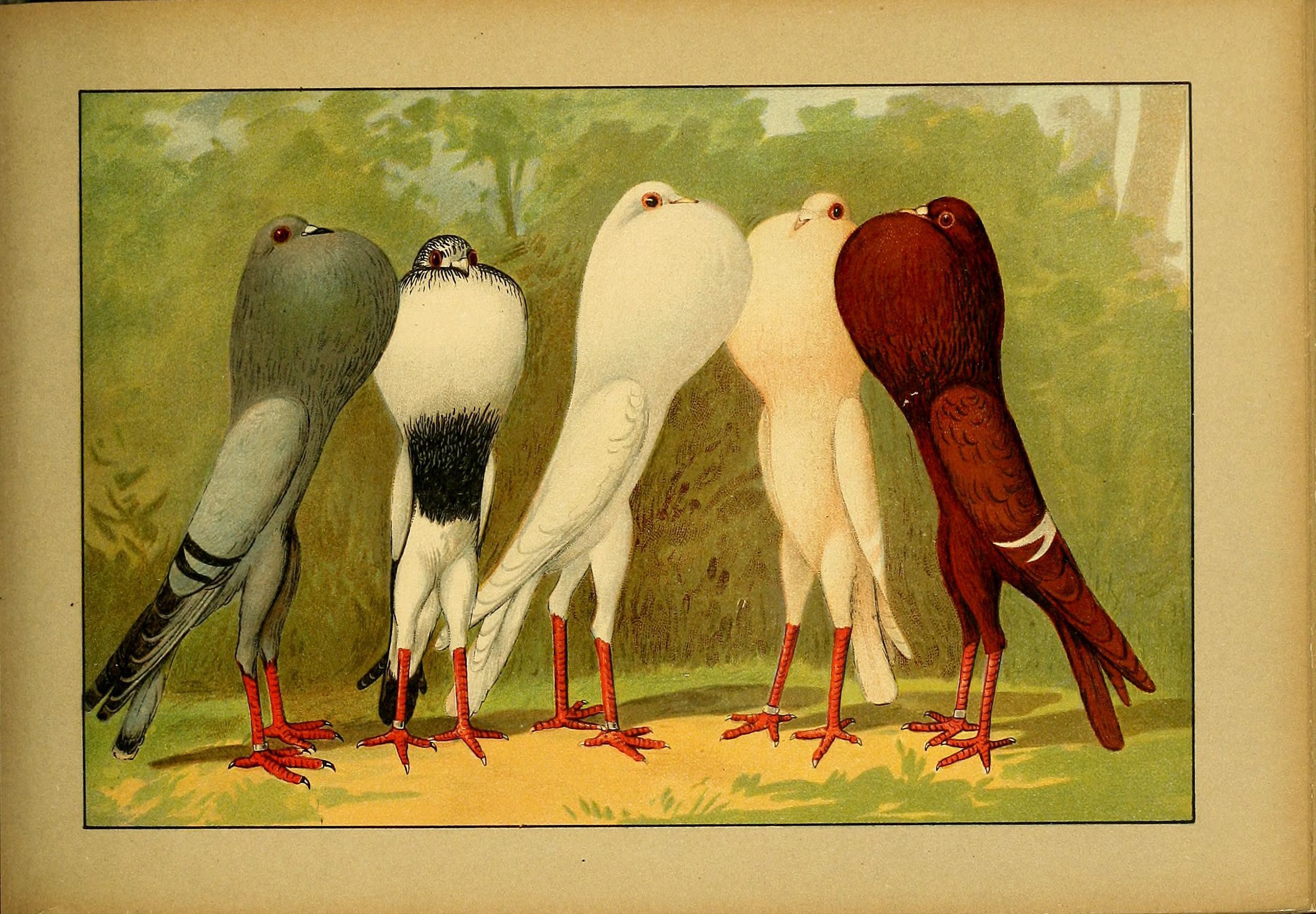
Schachtzabel 1906 Tafel 65

== See also ==
- Pigeon Diet
- Pigeon Housing
- List of pigeon breeds
- Brunn
