= Granadino Pouter =

Breed of pigeon

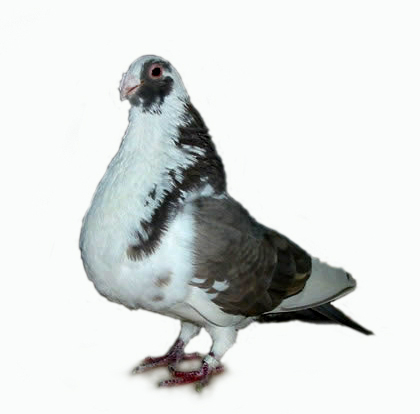
- Granadino Pouter
- Conservation status: Common

Classification
- US Breed Group: Fancy
- EE Breed Group: Pouter and Cropper

Notes
- Like the Gaditano Pouter this breed was originally bred for the game of pigeon thieving.

The Granadino Pouter is a breed of fancy pigeon developed over many years of selective breeding. Granadino Pouters, along with other varieties of domesticated pigeons, are all descendants of the rock dove (Columba livia).

== See also ==
- Gaditano Pouter
- List of pigeon breeds
