= Old German Cropper =

Breed of pigeon

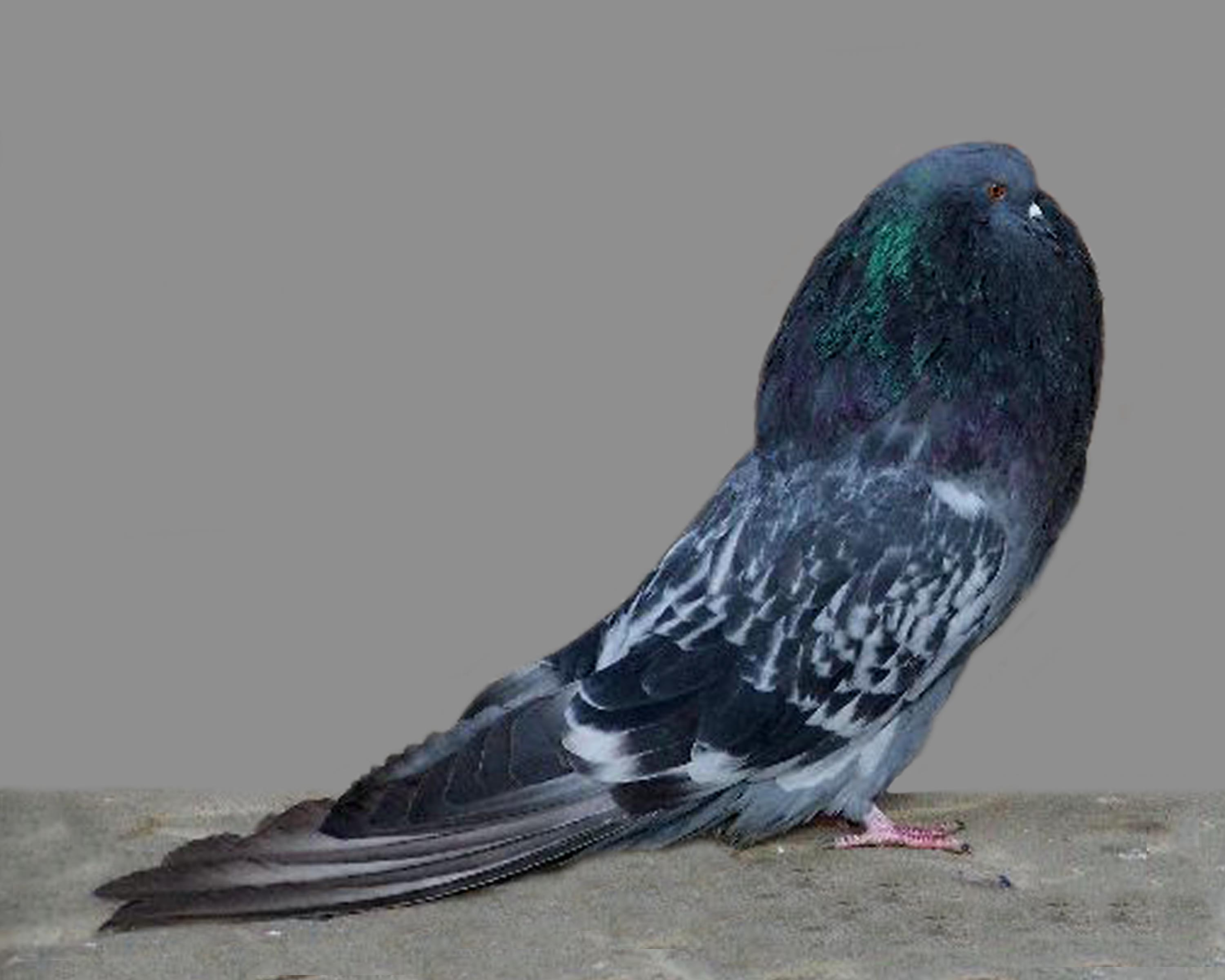
- Old German Cropper (blue chequer)
- Conservation status: Common

Classification
- US Breed Group: Fancy
- EE Breed Group: Cropper Pigeons

Notes
- One of the largest breeds of domesticated pigeon.

The Old German Cropper is a breed of fancy pigeon developed over many years of selective breeding. Old German Croppers, along with other varieties of domesticated pigeons, are all descendants from the rock pigeon (Columba livia).

An old breed that originated in Germany and Hungary.

== Description ==
The Old German Cropper is the longest breed of pigeon. It has a large well-inflated globe that is oval to round in shape. The old German stands with the front of its body raised in a semierect station and the rest of its body carried close and parallel to the ground. The wings are very long and ideally should extend beyond the tail. They should be well closed and not show a "sail like effect", that is caused by raised secondary feathers that break the smooth wing line. The legs are fairly short without showing the birds thighs that are covered by the undercarriage feathers.

== Colors and markings ==
The Old German comes in black, white, red, yellow, dun, cream, mealy, silver, blue in bar and check, and lark. They are self-colored, but also can be found in splash or a random mixture of white and colored feathers, tiger which should have dark flights and tail with white feathers sprinkled on the rest of the body, flights marked with a solid colored body and evenly marked white flights on both wings, and mussel head which is primarily found in black which manifests itself with a sprinkling of white feathers on the head reminiscent of the coloring of the shell mussel.

== General ==
The overall look of the Old German is large powerful pigeon. Some of this is created by the extreme feather development. The bird does not have a heavy body. Feather development should be smooth and neat without being tight.

== See also ==
- Pouter
- List of pigeon breeds
