= Pigmy Pouter =

Breed of pigeon

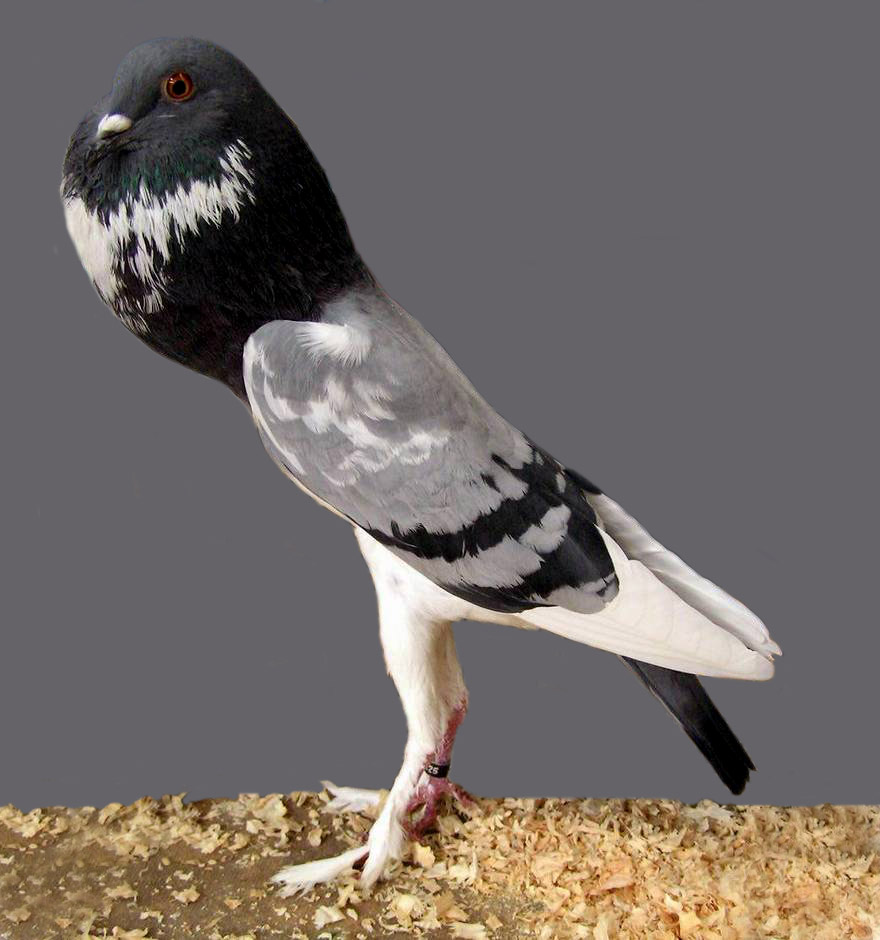
- Blue bar Pigmy Pouter
- Conservation status: Common
- Country of origin: England

Traits
- Feather ornamentation: slight foot feathering

Classification
- Australian Breed Group: Group 5 Pouters & Croppers
- US Breed Group: Croppers & Pouters
- EE Breed Group: Pouter Cropper

Notes
- The pigmy pouter is a smaller version of the English Pouter hence the name "pigmy"

The Pigmy Pouter is a breed of fancy pigeon developed over many years of selective breeding. Pigmy Pouters, along with other varieties of domesticated pigeons, are all descendants from the rock pigeon (Columba livia).

Noted British poultry breeder Sir John Sebright (who later bred the Sebright Bantam) is believed to have first bred the Pigmy Pouter, though the issue is debatable.

== North American reception ==
Although the pigmy pouter has been heralded as a bizarre creature and its popularity has not increased much from its introduction to North American society, it still has a dedicated fanbase gathered together by groups such as the American Pigmy Pouter Club, and The Canadian Pouter and Cropper Combine. Its low popularity makes obtaining such a bird a difficult task in North America. However, breeders have been striving to increase the bird's popularity and make it a more prevalent show bird.

== Gallery ==
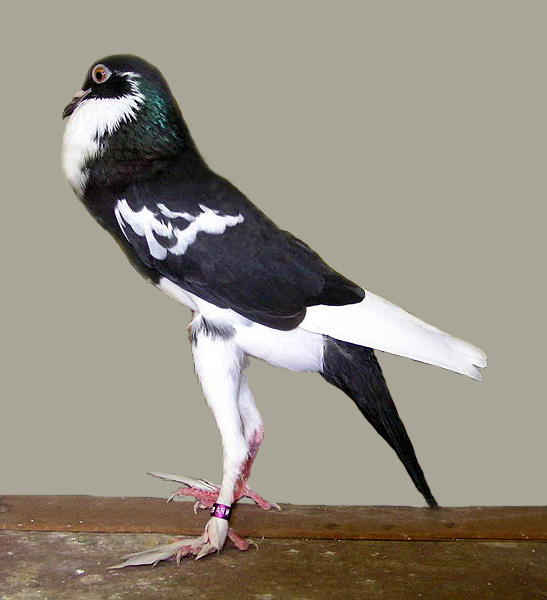
Black

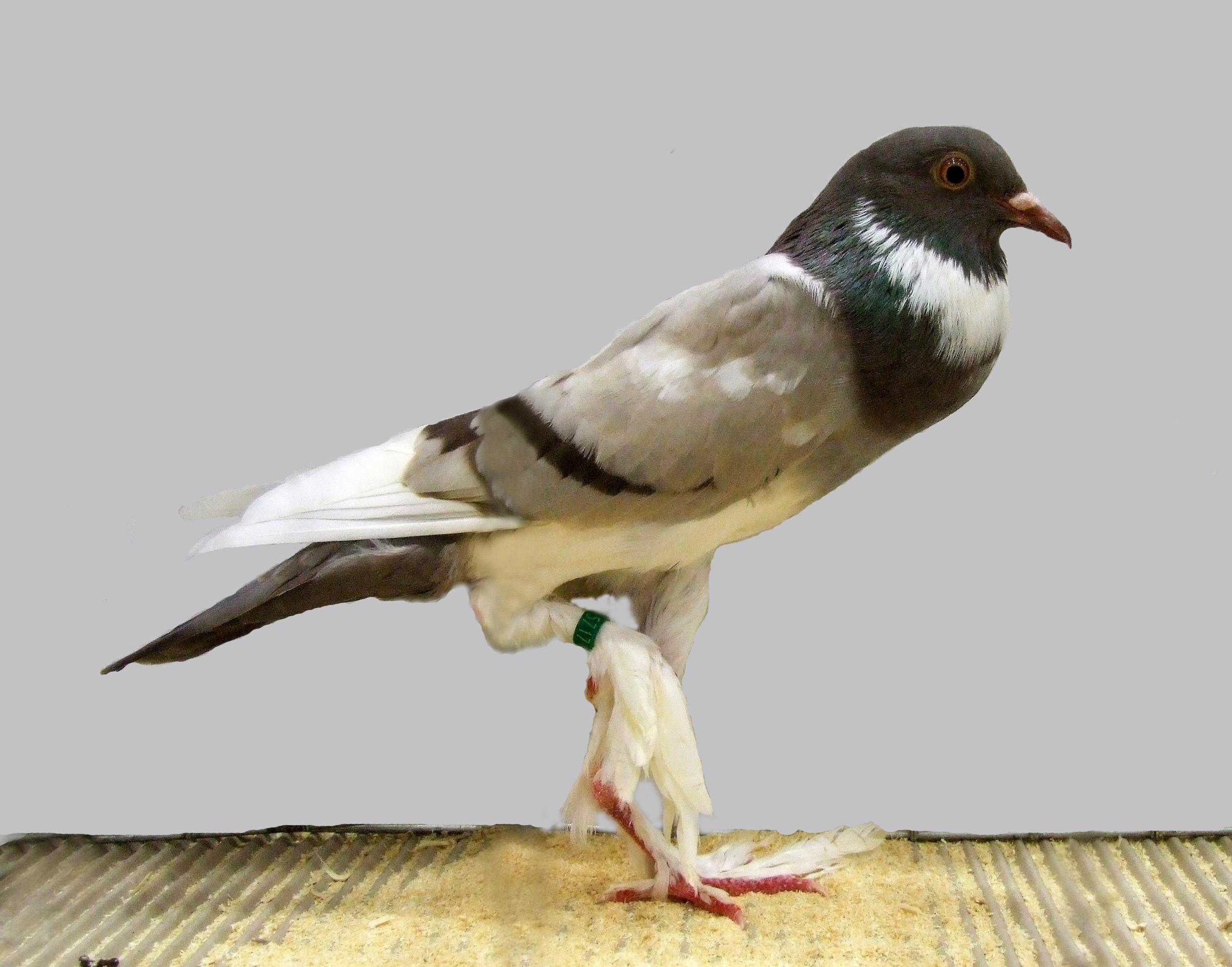
Blue bar

== See also ==
- Pigeon keeping
  - Pigeon Diet
  - Pigeon Housing
- Pouter

American Pigeon Journal October 1949

- List of pigeon breeds
