= Holle Cropper =

Breed of pigeon

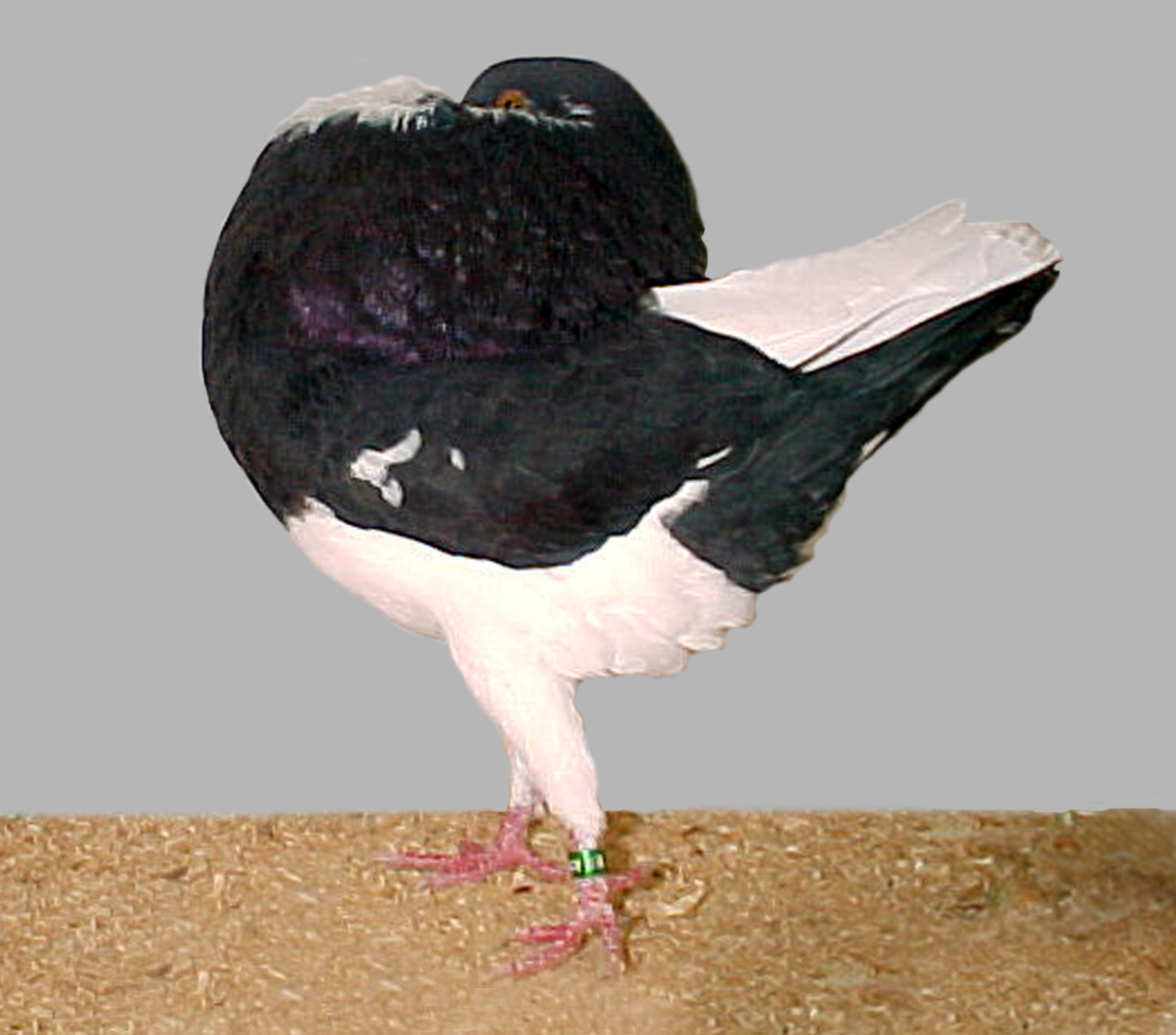
- Holle Cropper
- Conservation status: Common
- Nicknames: Balloon Cropper
- Country of origin: Netherlands

Classification
- Australian Breed Group: Pouter & Cropper Group 5
- US Breed Group: Cropper & Pouter
- EE Breed Group: Pouter and Cropper NL331

Notes
- The crop is very large and the head is held so far back that it can be difficult to see

The Holle Cropper (also known as the Amsterdam Balloon Cropper) is a breed of fancy pigeon developed over many years of selective breeding. Holle Croppers, along with other varieties of domesticated pigeons are all descendants from the rock pigeon (Columba livia). This breed was developed in Holland.

== Gallery ==
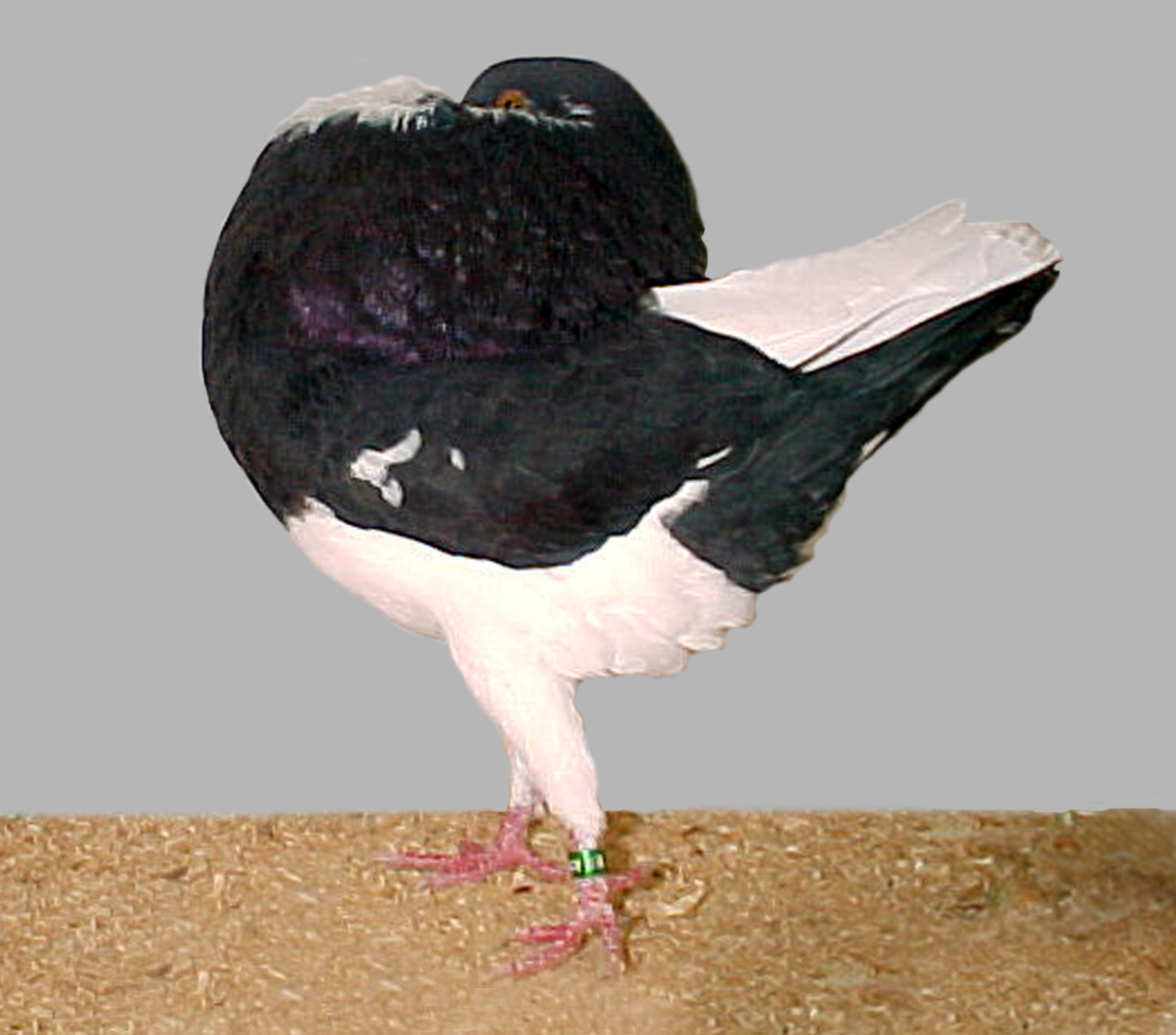
Black pied

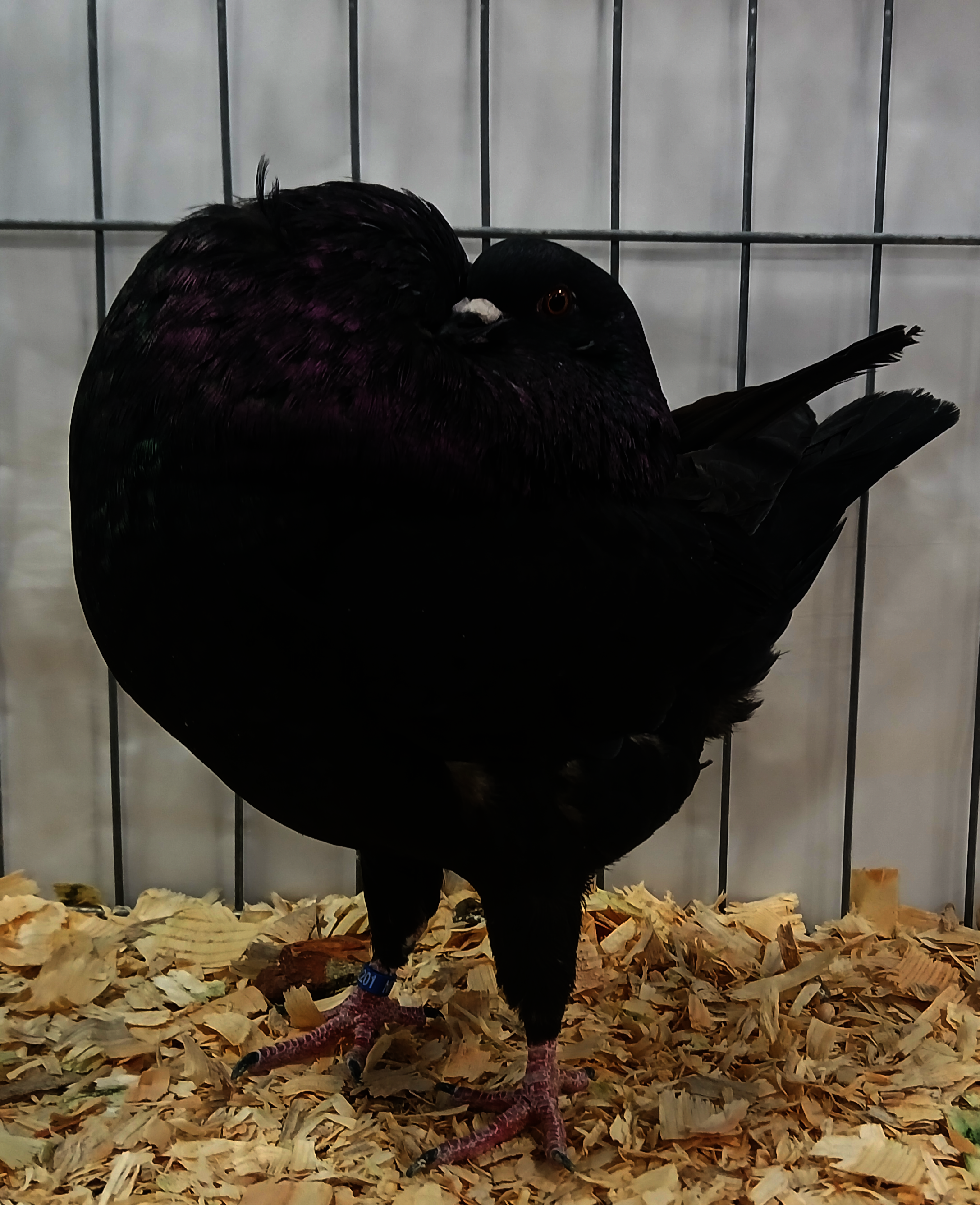
Black

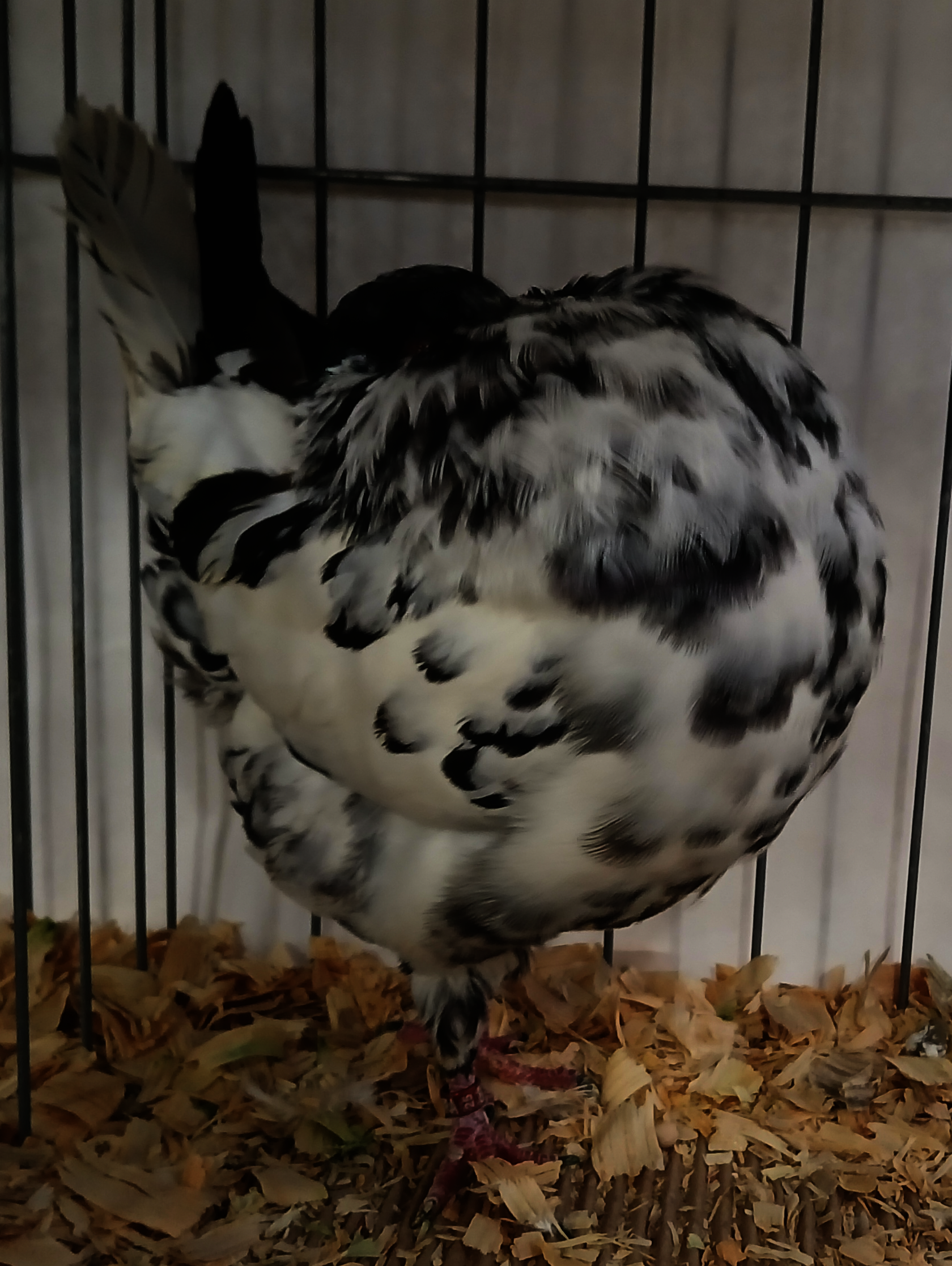
Spangled

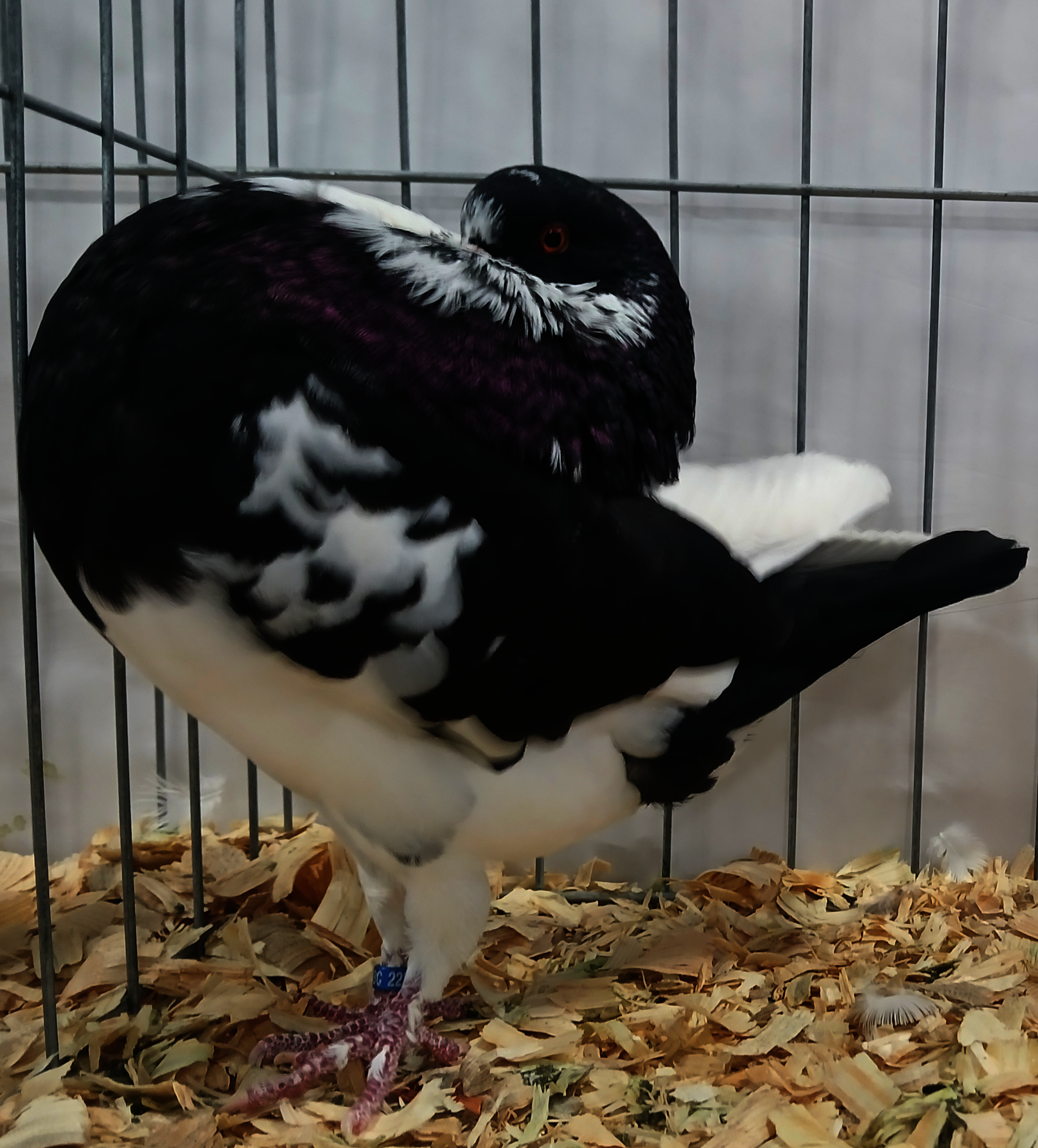
Splash

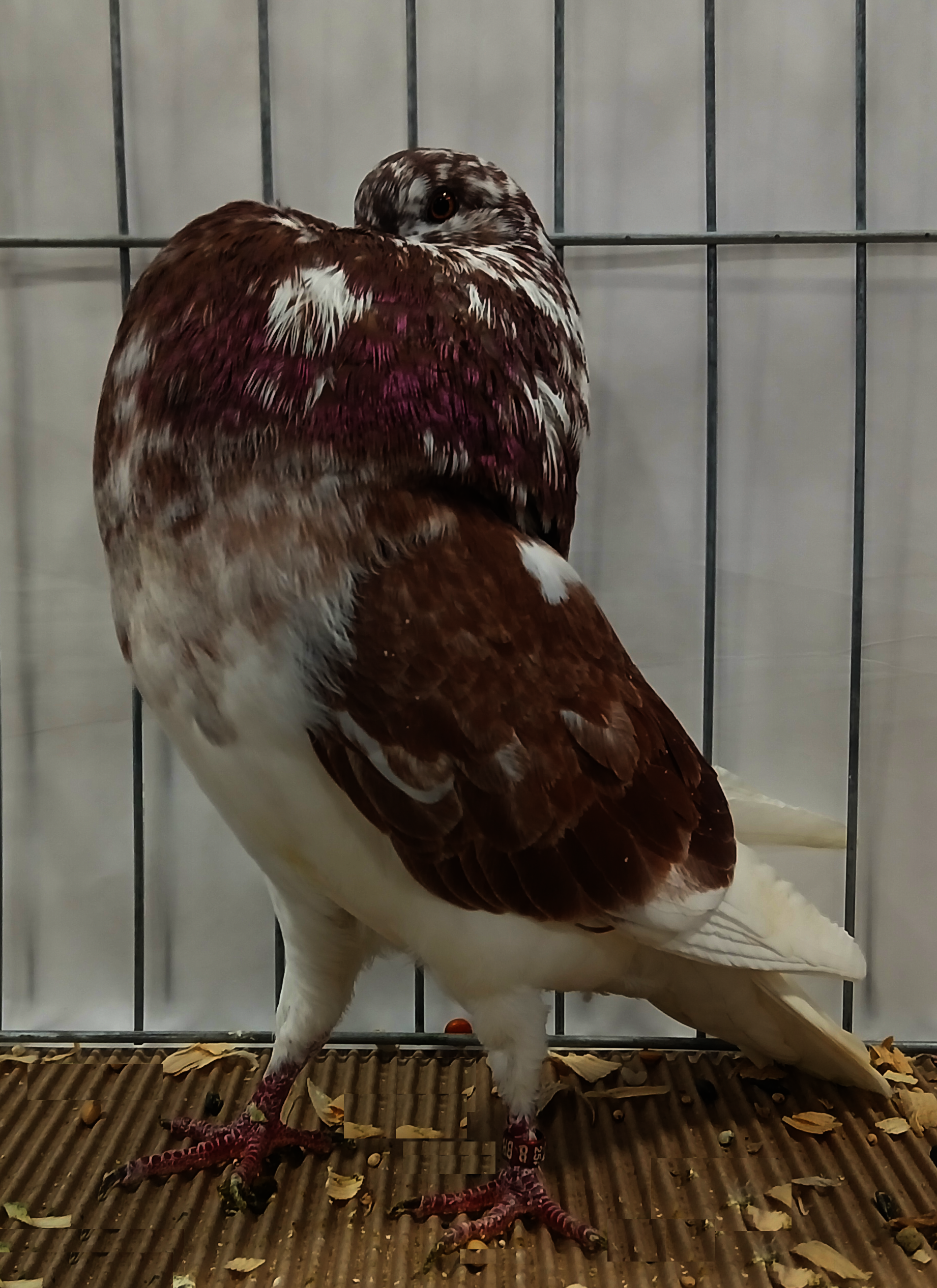
Ash red

== See also ==
- Pigeon Diet
- Pigeon Housing
- List of pigeon breeds
