= Crop (anatomy) =

Part of animal's throat

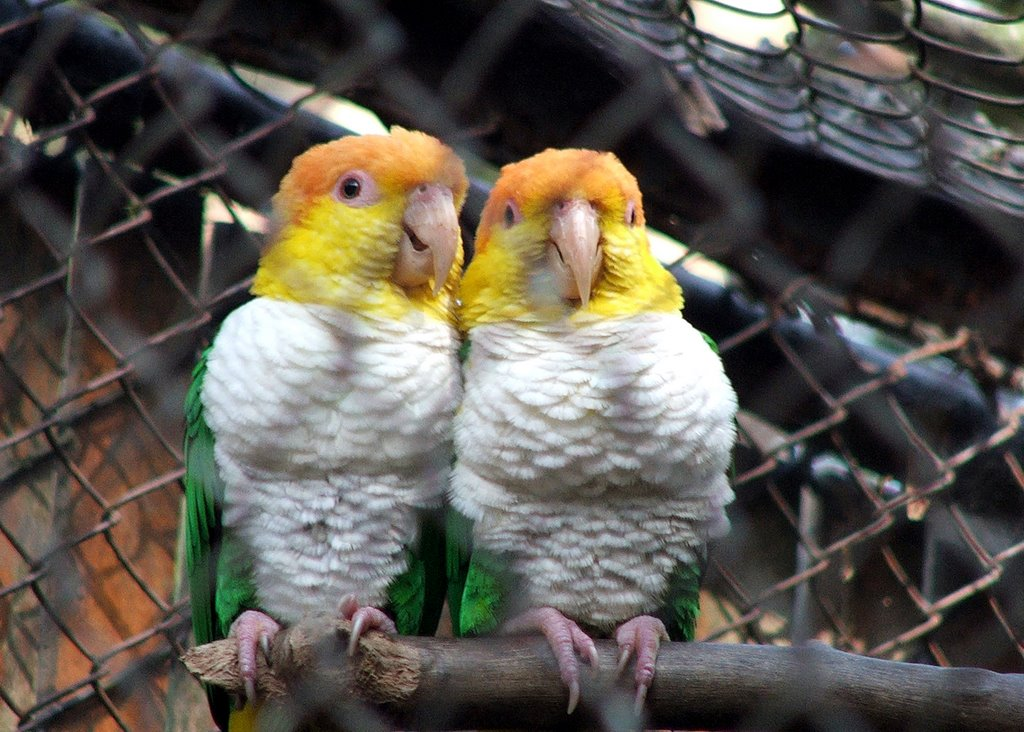
Two white-bellied parrots with bulging crops after feeding.

As a greylag goose eats grass, the full crop is clearly visible.

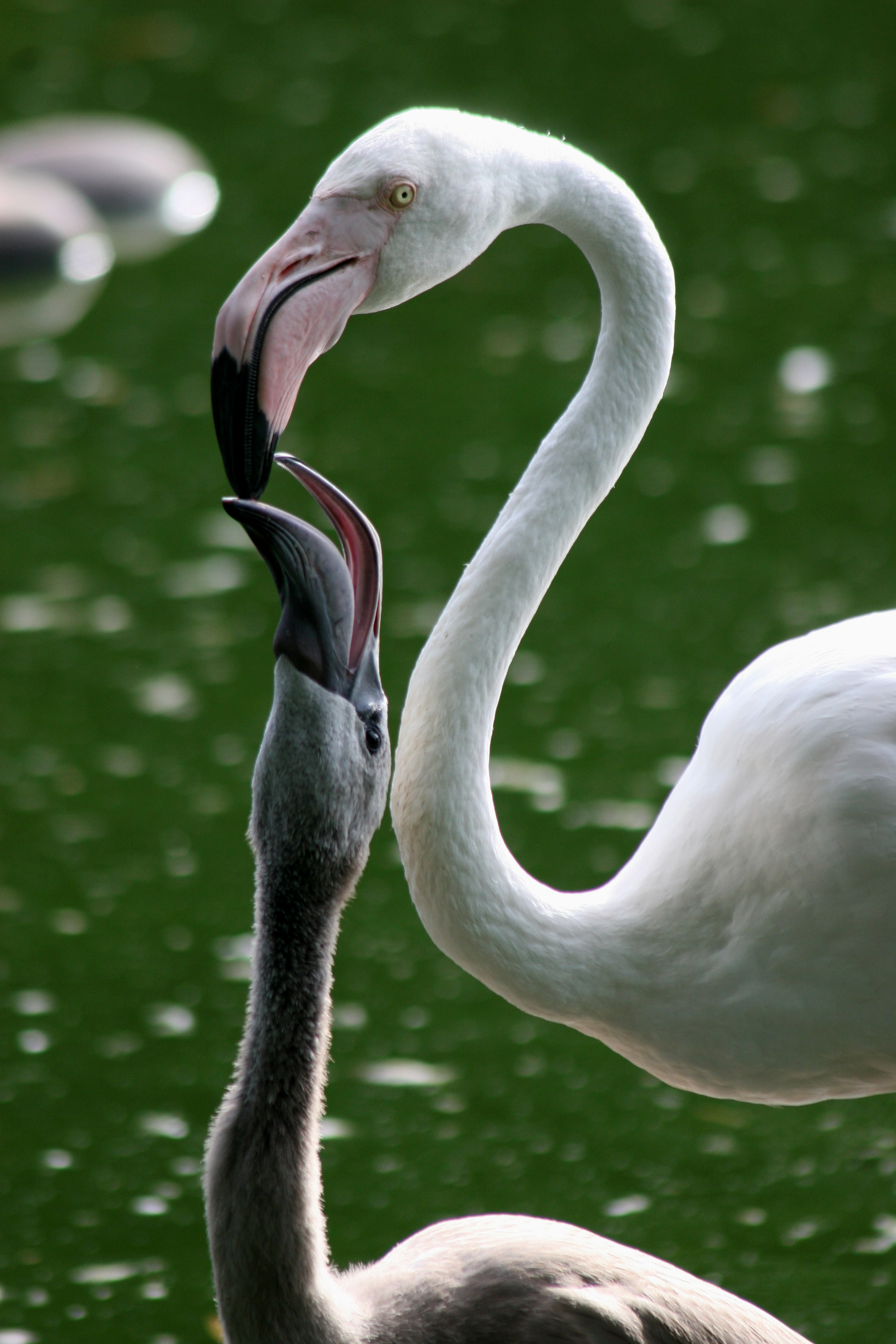
One greater flamingo-chick in Zoo Basel is fed on crop milk.

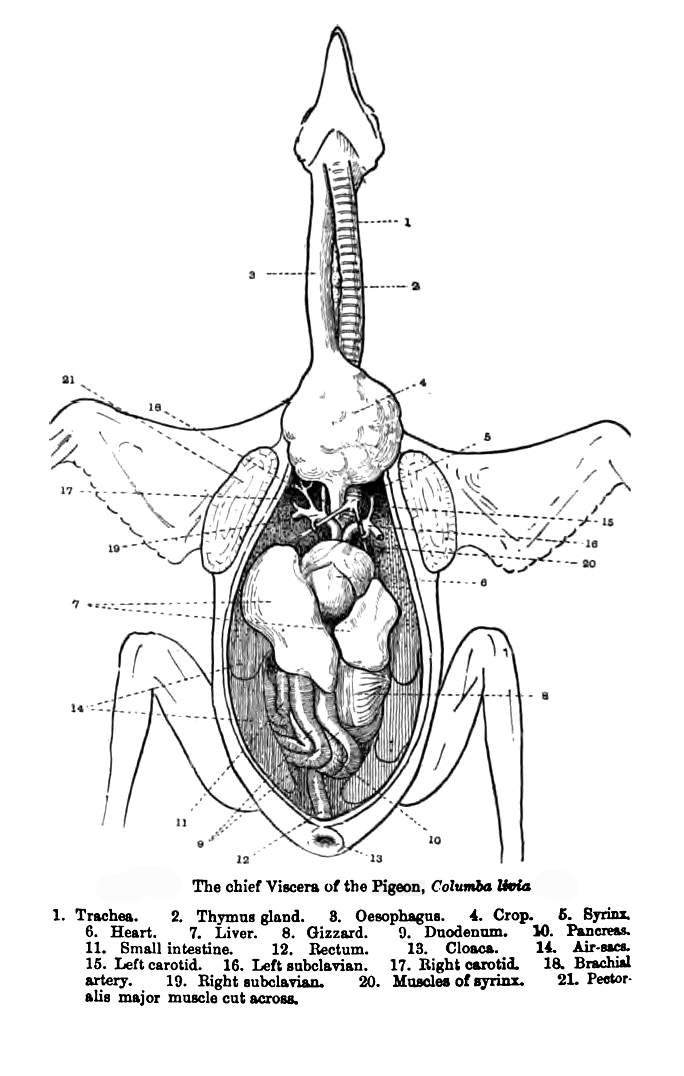
The crop (serial 4) of a pigeon (Columba livia) is prominently seen at the beginning of the alimentary canal.

The crop (also the croup, the craw, the ingluvies, and the sublingual pouch) is a thin-walled, expanded portion of the alimentary tract, which is used for the storage of food before digestion. The crop is an anatomical structure in vertebrate animals, such as birds, and invertebrate animals, such as gastropods (snails and slugs), earthworms, leeches, and insects.

== Insects ==
Cropping is used by bees to temporarily store nectar of flowers. When bees "suck" nectar, it is stored in their crops. Other Hymenoptera also use crops to store liquid food. The crop in eusocial insects, such as ants, has specialized to be distensible, and this specialization enables important communication between colonial insects through trophallaxis. The crop can be found in the foregut of insects.

== Birds ==
In a bird's digestive system, the crop is an expanded, muscular pouch near the gullet or throat. It is a part of the digestive tract, essentially an enlarged part of the esophagus. As with most other organisms that have a crop, it is used to temporarily store food. Not all bird species have one. In adult doves and pigeons, it can produce crop milk to feed newly hatched birds.

Scavenging birds, such as vultures, will gorge themselves when prey is abundant, causing their crop to bulge. They subsequently sit, sleepy or half torpid, to digest their food.

Most raptors, including hawks, eagles and vultures (as stated above), have a crop; however, owls do not. Similarly, all true quail (Old World quail and New World quail) have a crop, but buttonquail do not. Chickens, turkeys, ducks and geese possess a crop, as do parrots. Pigeons also have crops; one domestic breed type is even bred to exaggerate the typical crop-inflating behavior so that the crop is inflated like a balloon.

Some extinct birds like Enantiornithes did not have crops.

== Literary references ==
In the Sherlock Holmes story "The Adventure of the Blue Carbuncle" (1892), a valuable gem is hidden inside a bird's crop.

Craw is an obsolete term for crop, and this is still seen in the saying "it sticks in my craw" meaning "I can't [metaphorically] swallow it", that is, that a situation or other entity is unacceptable, or at any rate annoying.

== See also ==
- Esophagus
- Gizzard
- Gular pouch, in bird anatomy, a flap generally used to store fish and other prey while hunting
- Intestines
- Proventriculus
- Stomach
