= Reverse-wing Pouter =

Breed of pigeon

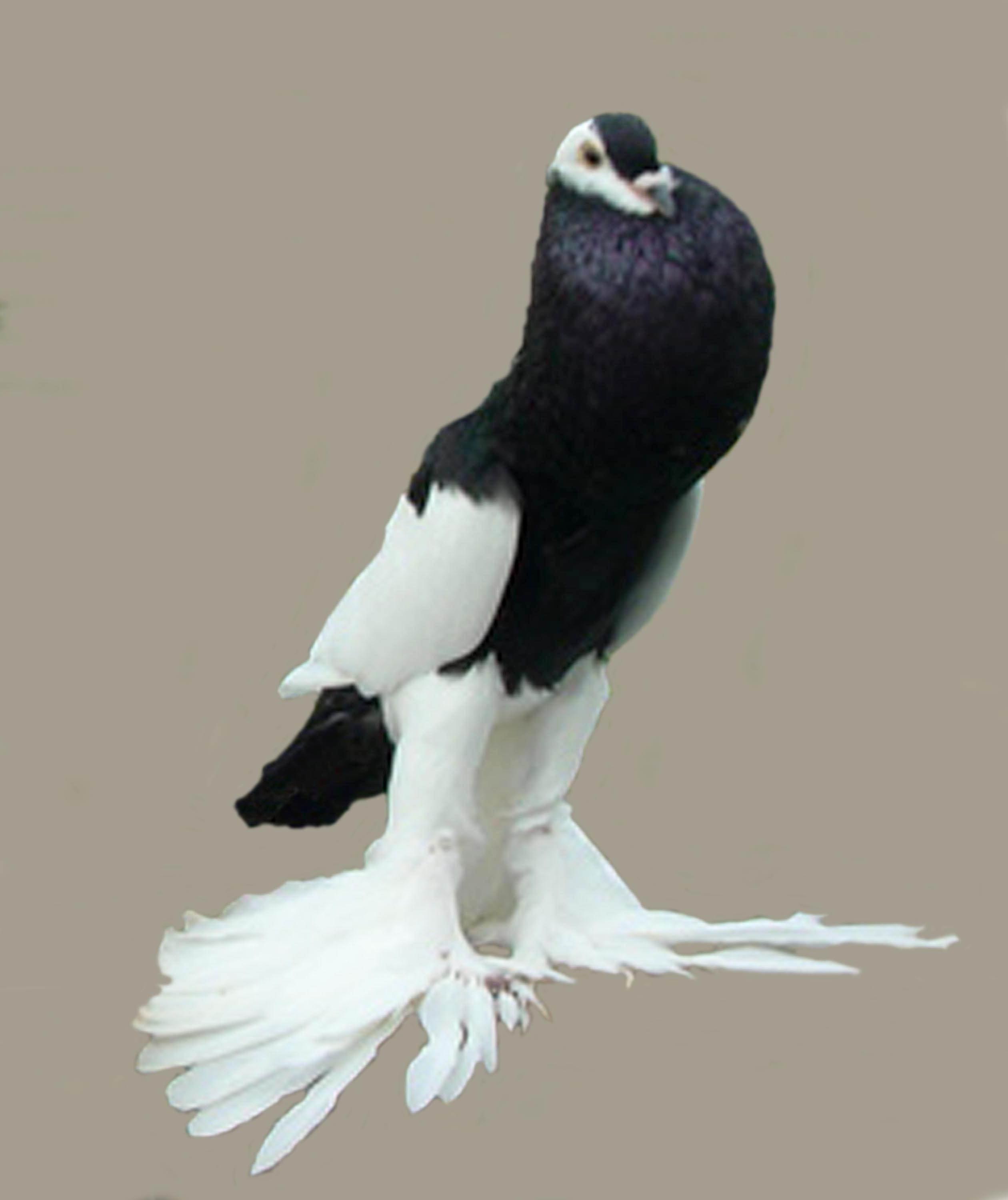
- A black Reverse-wing Pouter
- Conservation status: Common
- Other names: Reverse-wing Cropper (also spelled Reversewing or Reverse Wing)
- Country of origin: Germany

Classification
- Australian Breed Group: Cropper/Pouter Group 5
- US Breed Group: Cropper and Pouters
- EE Breed Group: Pouter/cropper

The Reverse-wing Pouter (German: Verkehrtflügelkröpfer) is a breed of fancy pigeon developed over many years of selective breeding. Reverse-wing Pouters, along with other varieties of domesticated pigeons, are all descendants of the rock dove (Columba livia). The breed is known for its eye-catching markings.

== Origin ==
The breed originated in Saxony and Thuringia in the early 19th century.

== Gallery ==
Black

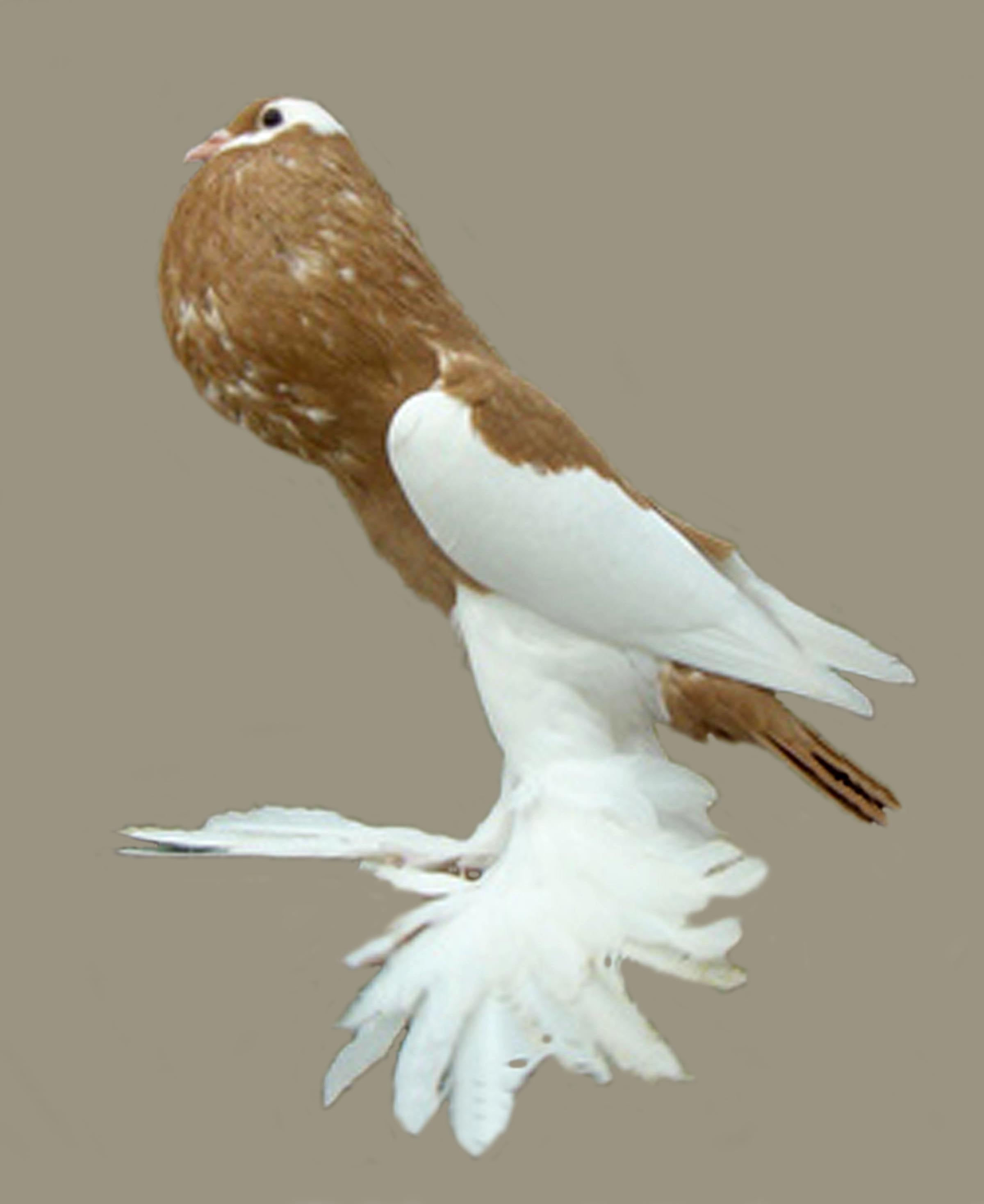
Yellow

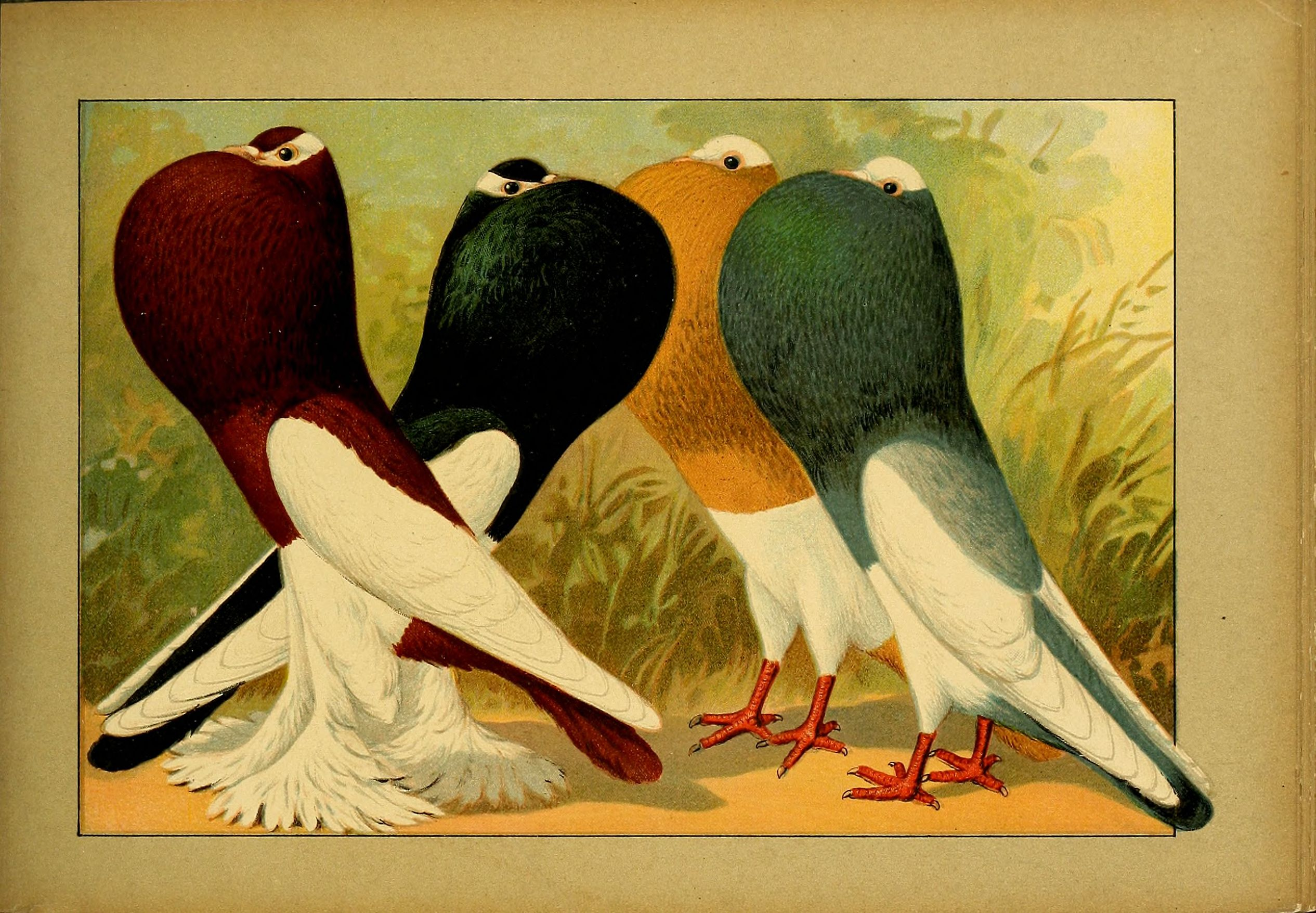
Schachtzabel 1906 Tafel 59

== See also ==
- Pigeon Diet
- Pigeon Housing
- List of pigeon breeds
