= Gaditano Pouter =

Breed of pigeon

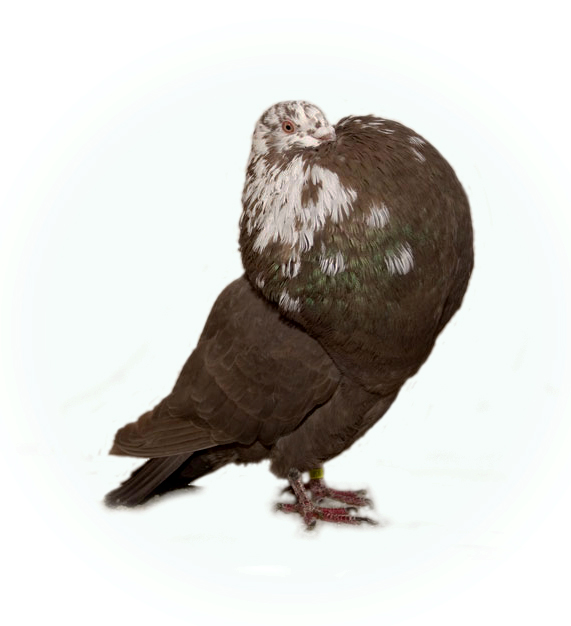
- Gaditano Pouter
- Conservation status: Uncommon
- Country of origin: Spain

Classification
- Australian Breed Group: Pouter & Cropper Group 5
- US Breed Group: Pouter & Cropper
- EE Breed Group: Pouter & Cropper E337

Notes
- This breed is used for a very special game referred to as "thieving".

The Gaditano Pouter is a breed of fancy pigeon developed over many years of selective breeding. Gaditano Pouters, along with other varieties of domesticated pigeons, are all descendants of the rock dove (Columba livia).

== Gallery ==
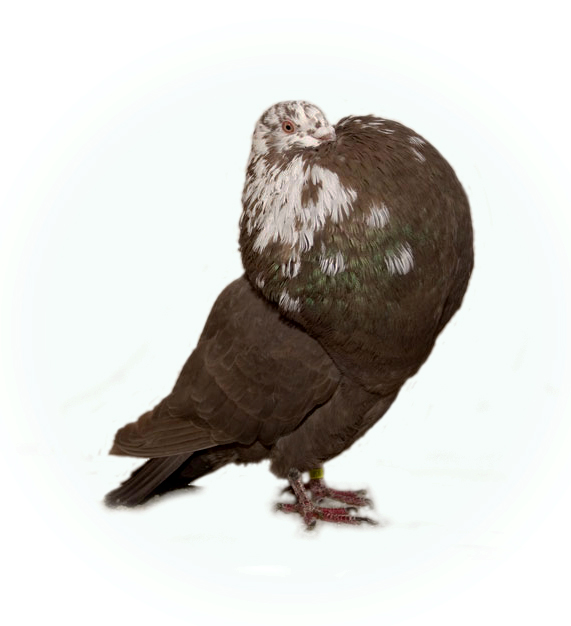
Red

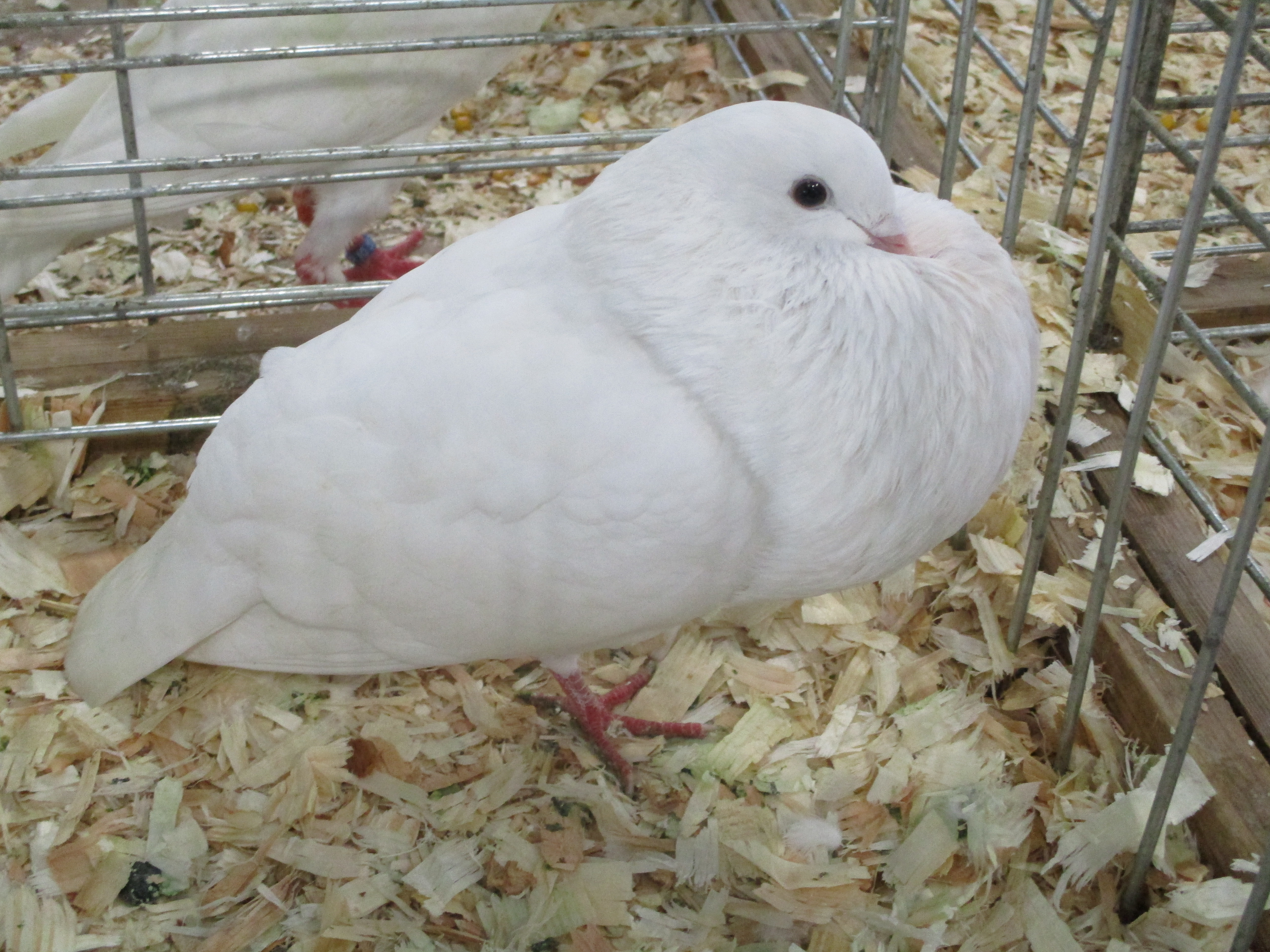
white

== See also ==
- Pigeon Diet
- Pigeon Housing
- List of pigeon breeds
