= Dutch Helmet =

Breed of fancy pigeon

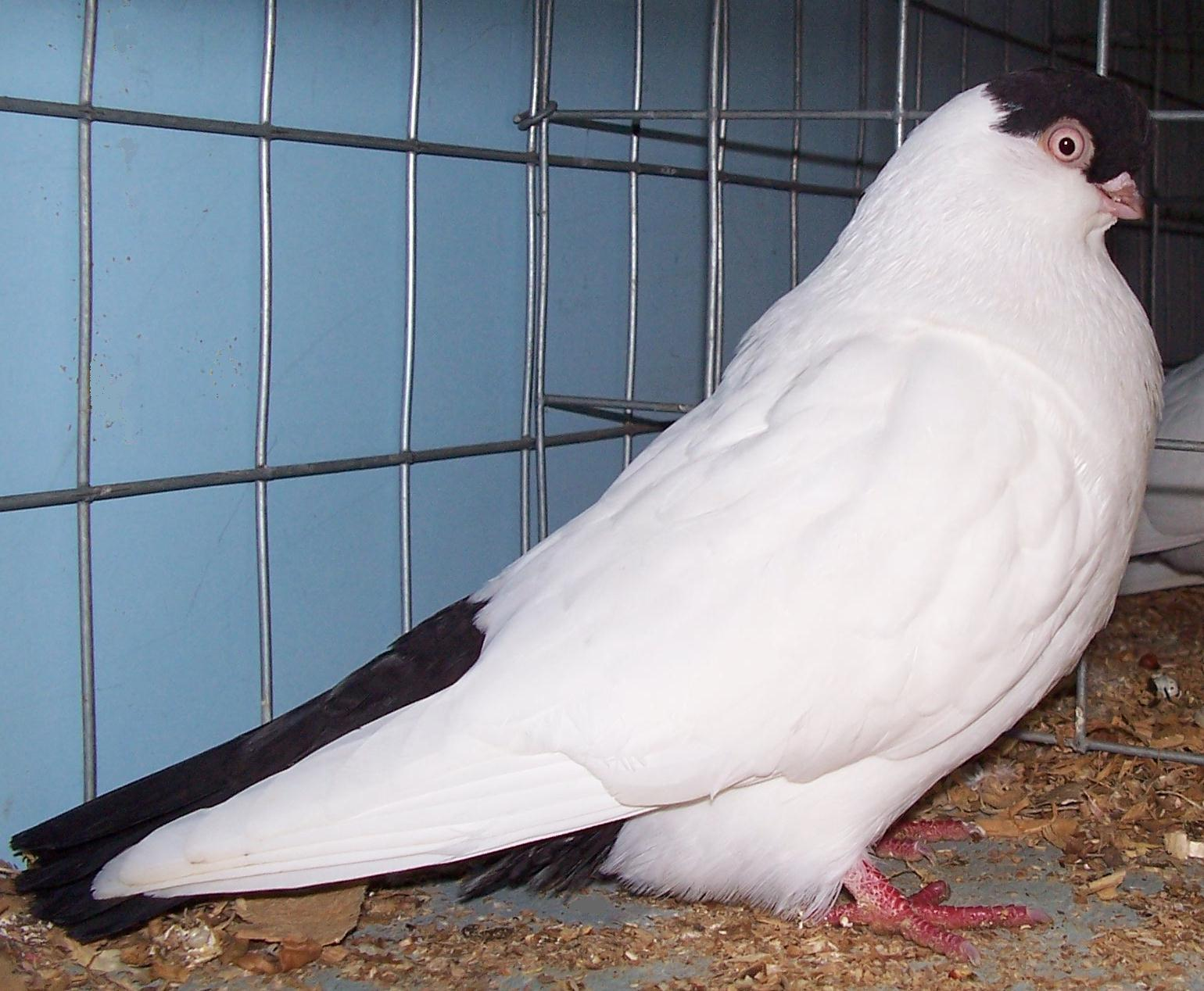
- A black Dutch helmet with a regressed beak (likely a result of crossbreeding).
- Conservation status: Not Evaluated
- Other names: Nederlandse Helmduif
- Nicknames: Helmet
- Country of origin: Netherlands

Traits
- Crest type: Plain-headed
- Feather ornamentation: Uncoloured with the exception of selected areas

Classification
- US Breed Group: Tumblers, Rollers, and Highflyers
- EE Breed Group: Tumblers and Highflyers

The Dutch Helmet or Nederlandse Helmduif in Dutch, is a breed of fancy pigeon created through generations of selective breeding for the purpose of highflying. It is recognised as a member of the Tumblers and Highflyers (EE0800 or individually as NL/0825) by the European Standard Committee for Pigeons. It is recognised under the Flyers breed group by the US National Pigeon Association. Dutch helmets, and helmets in general, are characterised by fully white bodies with colouration being present only on the tail feathers and on the top of the head, earning the breed its name. The colouration of the 'helmet' and tail feathers can come in multiple variations, including black, reddish-brown, yellow, and blue. The tail feathers consist of twelve feathers which overlay tightly and rarely part or fan. The wingtips are white and rest on the tail feathers. The legs are unfeathered past the knee and a hot pink or red colour. Dutch helmets have coloured irises with black pupils and narrow flesh toned rims around the eyes. The beak is typically average sized with a pinkish or reddish hue and occasionally a white lower mandible. The Dutch helmet is incredibly well-loved in the Netherlands and has garnered cultural significance over its history. It was selected pigeon breed of the year in 2023.

== History ==
As with all fancy pigeons, the Dutch helmet is a descendent of the rock dove (Columba livia), the incredibly phenotypically diverse ancestral species to all modern pigeon breeds. The rock dove was likely first domesticated around 5,000 years ago in the Middle East and Mediterranean regions. The Dutch helmet belongs to the tumblers and highflyers breed group, characterised by near total monophylogeny, aside from a single member being the mookee pigeon. The group's monophylogenetic nature is in spite of it being the largest pigeon breed group. Often claimed as one of Europe and the Netherlands' oldest pigeon breeds, helmets were discussed and depicted in wood cut portraits in the 1600 third volume of Italian naturalist Ulisse Aldrovandi's (1522-1608) Ornithologiae, where multiple domestic breeds of pigeon were depicted and discussed. Dutch writer, Johan van Vollenhove, also wrote of the helmet in 1686 in Utrecht, Netherlands, further substantiating claims of the breed's longtime presence in Europe and the Netherlands. Despite almost exclusively being referred to as the "Dutch" helmet, the breed actually traces its roots back to Persia, where it was likely introduced to the Netherlands through trade routes taken by the Dutch traders of the Dutch East India Company in 1600.

In a modern context, the Dutch helmet was first recognised as a distinct breed in 1927 by the Dutch Standard Committee by specialists and club leaders at the time, Spruyt, Logman, Goese, Shneider, and Linnebank. The breed's recognition by the committee predates even the old Dutch owl by 11 years, a breed which has existed in Europe for a similar timeframe. Before 1927, the breed was bred in guided conditions to no particular standard or description. The Dutch helmet was once mentioned on the UN Critical Breeds List of the Food and Agriculture Organisation (FAO), a list compiling some 438 animal breeds with less than 100 female individuals for breeding. The modern list however, notes only the hyacinth pigeon and groningen slenk as critical Dutch breeds. For a brief period an association dedicated solely to Dutch helmets did exist in the Netherlands, established by chairman P. De Vries, secretary Leemhuis, and treasurer Kreuger, all members of the Standard Dutch Committee. The association was approved by the Netherlands Fancy Pigeon Association (Nederlandse Bond van Sierduivenliefhebbers or NBS in Dutch) in 1947 but did not last very long.

=== World War II and recovery breeding efforts ===
During the second World War, the breeding and keeping of fancy pigeons was prohibited by Germany in the occupied Netherlands. Prior to this, large collections of Dutch helmets were kept and displayed by breeders such as Tuyt in 1918, and Gouverne throughout the 1930s in Oegstgeest and Heerlen respectively. As a result of the ban, pigeon fanciers would scramble to protect and hide their collections from Nazi occupation. Efforts to preserve many rare Dutch breeds were made, The largest major collection to survive the war was that of Dutch Standard Committee specialist, Spruyt, who kept a large colony of black and red helmets in his home in Gouda, being allowed to do as such by the Germans. Smaller disjointed collections of yellow and blue helmets were also discovered after the war had ended in Amsterdam, a city where the breed had always been incredibly popular. Following the war, the surviving Dutch helmets were of poor quality and they had to be restored through crossbreeding in the following years. Some deficiencies in the breed following the war (around 1950), included shorter, unfavourably coloured red eye rims, which are both uncharacteristic of tumbler breeds. H.T.G. Moezelaar of Dutch pigeon magazine Fokkers belangen and a previous member of the Dutch Standard Committee and Alex Richarta, chairman of Kölner Tümmlerverein, the Cologne Drum Club for tumblers uncovered a massive collection of much more standardised Cologne helmets after the war, and it was these pigeons that were used to re-standardise the Dutch helmet as a breed.

== Morphological standard ==
The Dutch helmet in its current standardised form must comply to a variety of criteria in order to be considered show worthy. Common points of anatomy scrutinised in shows are the forehead, eyes and eye rims, plumage, and build.

Ideally, a Dutch helmet should be bigger than a Dutch highflyer and slightly smaller than a Hague highflyer. It should have a strong body with a developed keel and underbelly for highflying and tumbling, as well as refined flight feathers for the same purpose. A compact, deep, wide, and powerfully set breast is also ideal to maximise flying capacity. The standard outlines that the forehead should be partially rounded and well filled, and the head should be smooth. The Dutch helmet's posture should be horizontal and erect The wings should have wide pens, and the tips of the wings should rest on the tail and come to a stop approximately 1cm (0.4in) before the tail feathers. The wings should never cross when resting, and the shoulders should be flat and sloped towards the wings. THe legs should be totally unfeathered in Dutch helmets however, helmet breeds with muffs do exist. The muffs on these breeds (such as those on the Cologne helmet) begin under the hocks and are the same colour as the individual pigeon's helmet and tail feathers.

In plumage, Dutch helmets should be completely uncoloured aside from the helmet itself, and the tail feathers. The helmet should be clearly defined and run in a line forming a cap on the pigeon's head, starting at the corner of the beak and wrap around the back of the head passing under the eye. The helmet may also dip slightly behind the head. Unlike in some pigeon breeds where the beak is purposefully reduced as standard, the beak of the helmet should be of adequate length and horizontal. The eyes of the Dutch helmet should be a pale pearl colour with pale eye rims and pupils that are as small as possible.

== Breeding and characteristics ==
There exist two distinct types of Dutch helmet, being the flying helmets, which are bred to tumble and highfly, as was the breed's original intention upon its creation and throughout its history, and the show helmets, which are presented for exhibition. Flying helmets are noted to be marginally smaller and louder than show helmets, which are bred to be larger and quieter. Additionally, show helmets tend to be slower and far less adept to tumbling and highflying, and so when housing both show and flying helmets together, training the latter for athletic capability can be difficult. When in flight, Dutch helmets fly in drastic swinging and swaying motions, offering a striking tumbling style that is displayed particularly well in high winds, characteristic of such highflying breeds.

Breeding is said to be rather difficult by Moezelaar, who regards that; "The path of the Helmet breeder is really full with pitfalls and traps and that's why one should see the breeding of good Helmets as a great achievement" in his October 1984 article, National Helmet Pigeon. Moezelaar writes that the eye rims are particularly hard to breed to standard, their pale colour being difficult to achieve, and that the beak should almost always be coloured. He also recounts that only recently has the committee been compliant in black helmets having uncoloured beaks, simply due to how difficult it is for most breeders to achieve colour with the specific variant. Pigeon breeder and translator of Moezelaar's original 1984 article, Jan de Wit, offers a few basic breeding methods used for helmets in his piece on the breed The Nederlandse Helmduif, such as separating the young from breeding pairs during the summer breeding season, and separating the males and females to discourage breeding in the winter off-season. Unlike Moezelaar, he claims breeding to be quite easy.

While crossbreeding with similar pigeon breeds is often encouraged among breed groups to achieve desirable characteristics that meet criteria, crossbreeding Dutch helmets with other helmet breeds will usually impair the creation of desirable characteristics. The modern Cologne helmet for example, is far too slim to be reliable in breeding desirable characteristics if paired with a Dutch helmet. It lacks the wide, compact, rounded breast of ideal Dutch helmets, and also possesses longer tail feathers, further distinguishing the breeds and discouraging crossbreeding. The two were far more homogenous during the post-war era, making crossbreeding viable for restoration purposes. Similarly to the Cologne, the Hamburger helmet and Danish helmet also differ too greatly to be crossbred with the Dutch helmet due to the Hamburger's face being too short, and the Danish's tendency to cause undesirable red eye rims in crossbred offspring.

== See also ==
- Pigeon Diet
- Pigeon Housing
- Helmet Pigeons
- List of Pigeon Breeds
- EE List of Fancy Pigeon Breeds
- US List of Fancy Pigeon Breeds
- Netherlands Fancy Pigeon Association
