= Nun pigeon =

Breed of pigeon

Nun
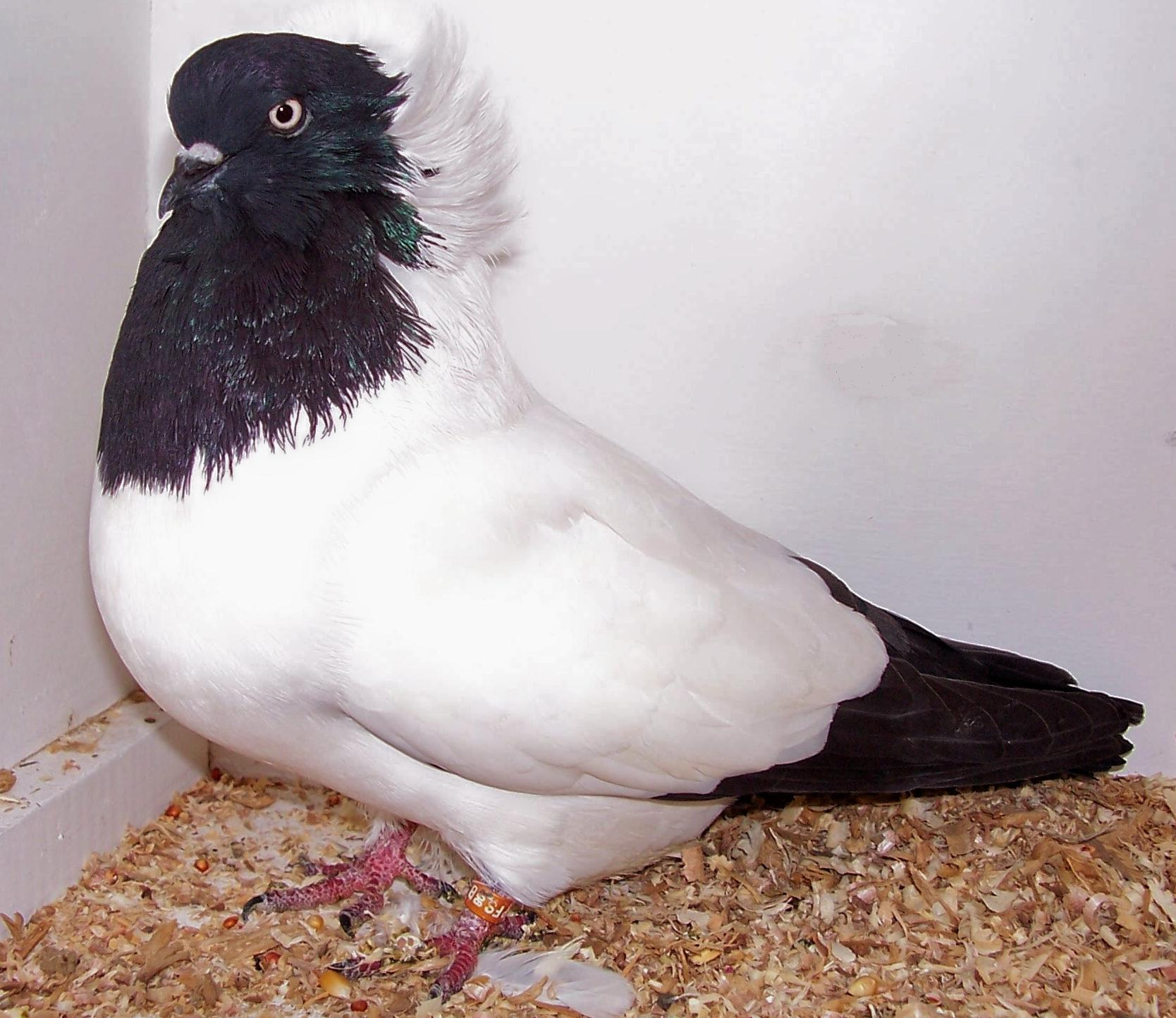
- Conservation status: Common
- Other names: Dutch Shell Pigeon

Traits
- Crest type: Full shell type

Classification
- Australian Breed Group: Group 6
- US Breed Group: Fancy
- EE Breed Group: Tumbler Pigeons

The Nun (or English Nun) is a breed of fancy pigeon developed through many years of selective breeding. It was known as the Dutch Shell Pigeon in continental Europe. Nuns, along with other varieties of domesticated pigeons, are all descendants of the rock dove (Columba livia). The Nun is one of the oldest breeds and was originally a flying tumbler before being developed for exhibition. It is a mostly white breed, with a hood of colored feathers, which gives the name to the breed.

== Description ==
The Nun is given its name by the raised feathers which form a kind of hood which covers the back of the neck and head, resembling a nun. Continental Europe previously referred to the Nun as the Dutch Shell Pigeon during the early part of the 20th century. It resembles the tumbler, from which this breed of pigeon originated; although as with all domestic pigeons they are descended from the rock dove (Columba livia). They have mostly white bodies and are designated according to the color of their head, for example, a black headed Nun, or a yellow headed Nun. Only the head, tail and the flight feathers are colored. Nuns are one breed in a group of pigeons who fly at high altitudes, along with types of tumblers and the magpie pigeon.

The British Nun Club standard for the Nun states that the ideal size for male Nuns should be 9 inches (23 cm) from the top of the bird's head to their feet, and 10 inches (25 cm) from the front of the chest to its tail. Female and young Nuns should be roughly the same size. The beak should be straight but stout, and the eyes a pearly white.

Charles Darwin referred to the Nun in The Variation of Animals and Plants Under Domestication, where he described how the Nun and Jacobin breeds of pigeon have evolved to have less caudal vertebrae than the rock dove, from which they originate. The breed remains popular and can be seen at the larger exhibitions. The American Pigeon Journal devoted an entire special issue for the breed.

== Gallery ==
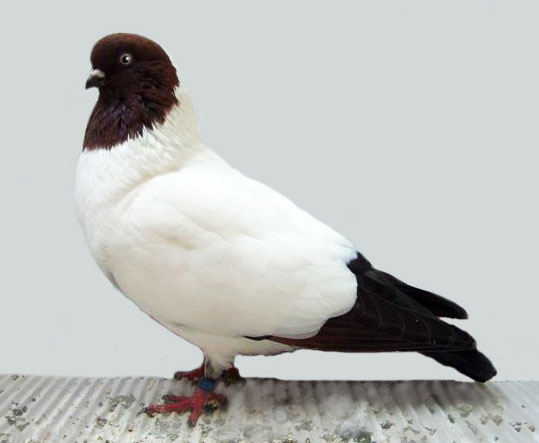
Plain head

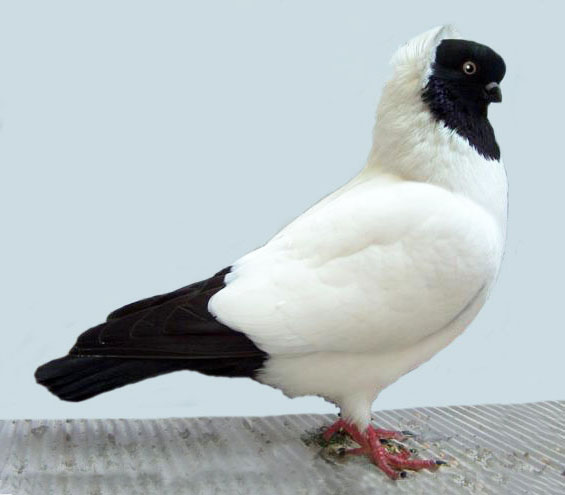
Black

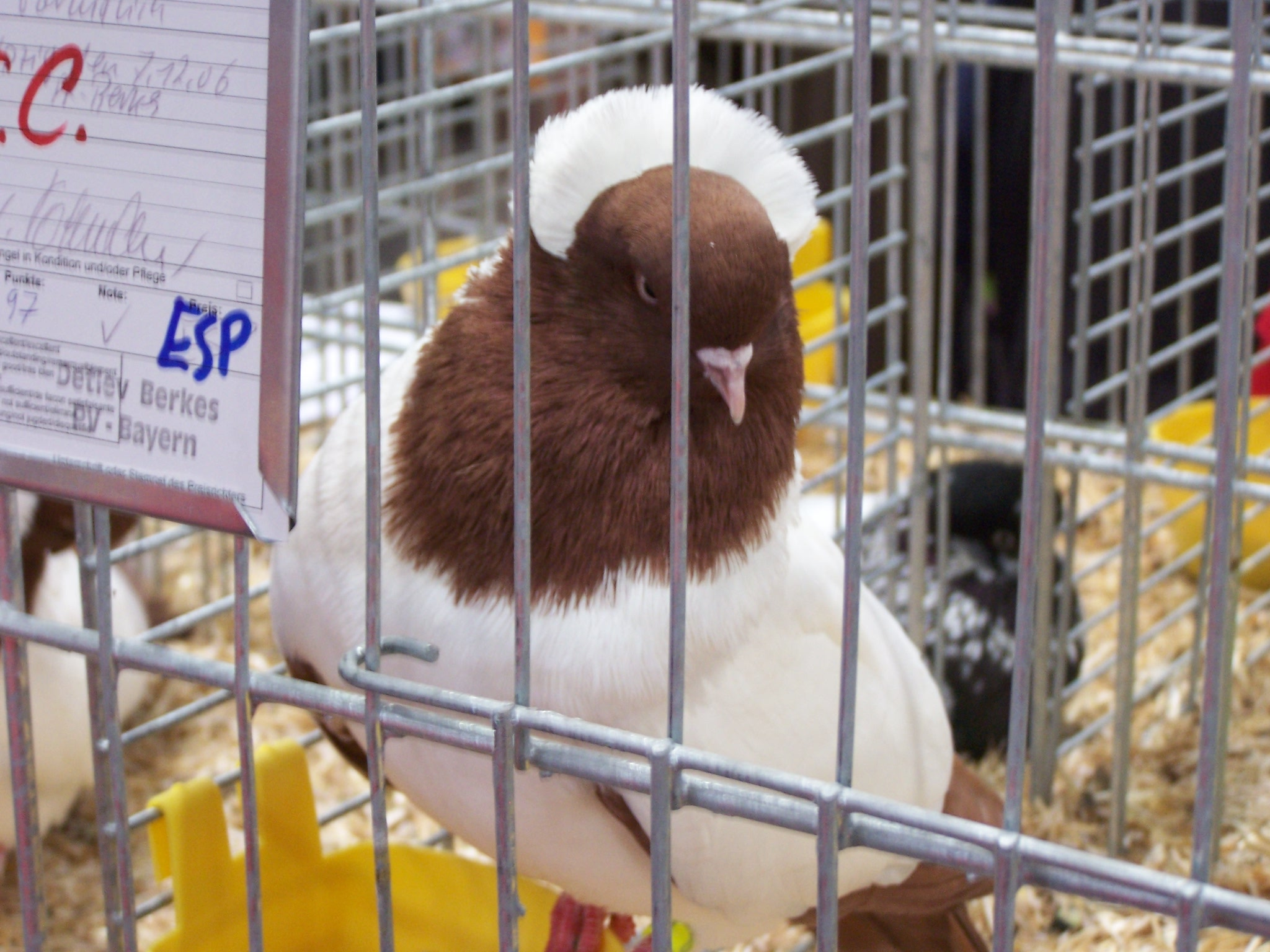
Red

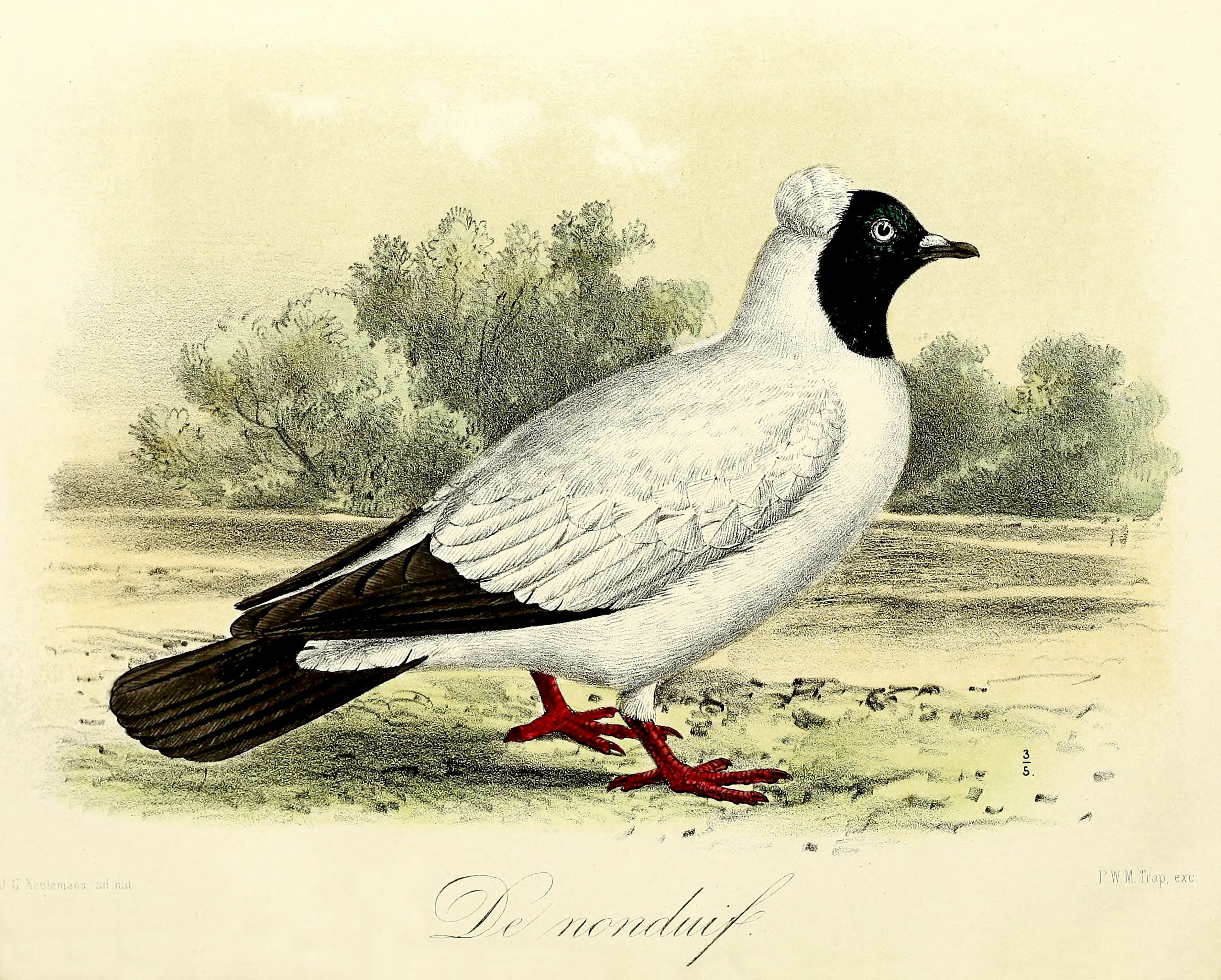
Keulemans Onze Vogels 1869

== See also ==
- Pigeon Diet
- Pigeon Housing
- German Nun
- Helmet
- Polish Helmet
- List of pigeon breeds
