= Helmet pigeon =

Breed of pigeon

Helmet
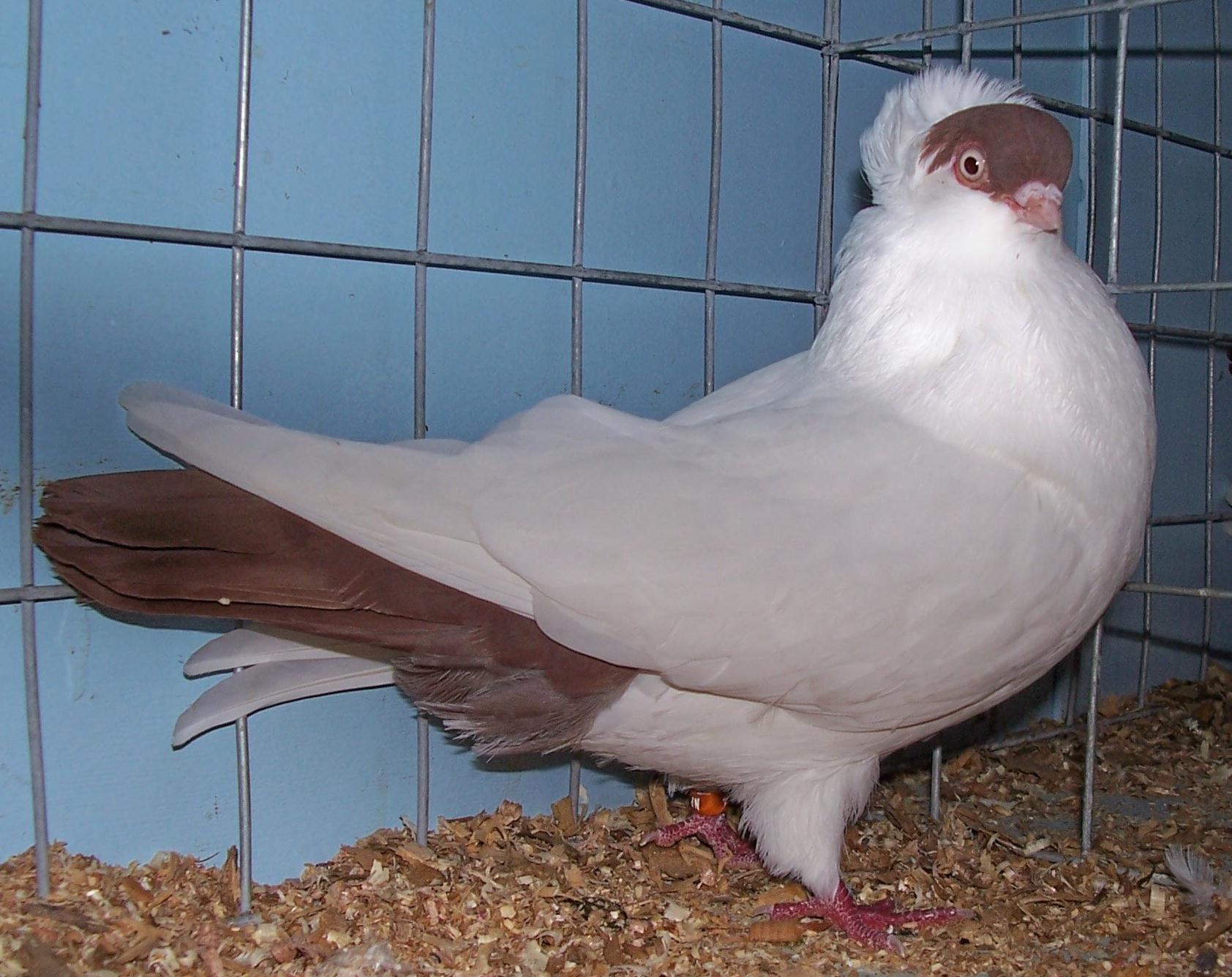
- Red Helmet
- Conservation status: Common

Traits
- Crest type: Some have crests
- Feather ornamentation: Some have foot feathering

Classification
- Australian Breed Group: Group 6
- US Breed Group: Fancy
- EE Breed Group: Tummler Tauben

Notes
- This breed has several minor variations: medium-faced, short-faced, plainheaded and crested.

The Helmet is a breed of fancy pigeon developed over many years of selective breeding. Helmets, along with other varieties of domesticated pigeons, are all descendants of the rock dove (Columba livia). The breed has medium-faced, short-faced, plain-headed and crested varieties. It comes in several colors including: Blue, Black, Red, and Yellow. Helmet pigeons have been referenced since the early 15th century and appear to have origins in Germany. The modern varieties were refined in the latter 20th century. The American Pigeon Journal, the leading pigeon magazine in American devoted an entire issue to the breed for December 1968.

== Gallery ==
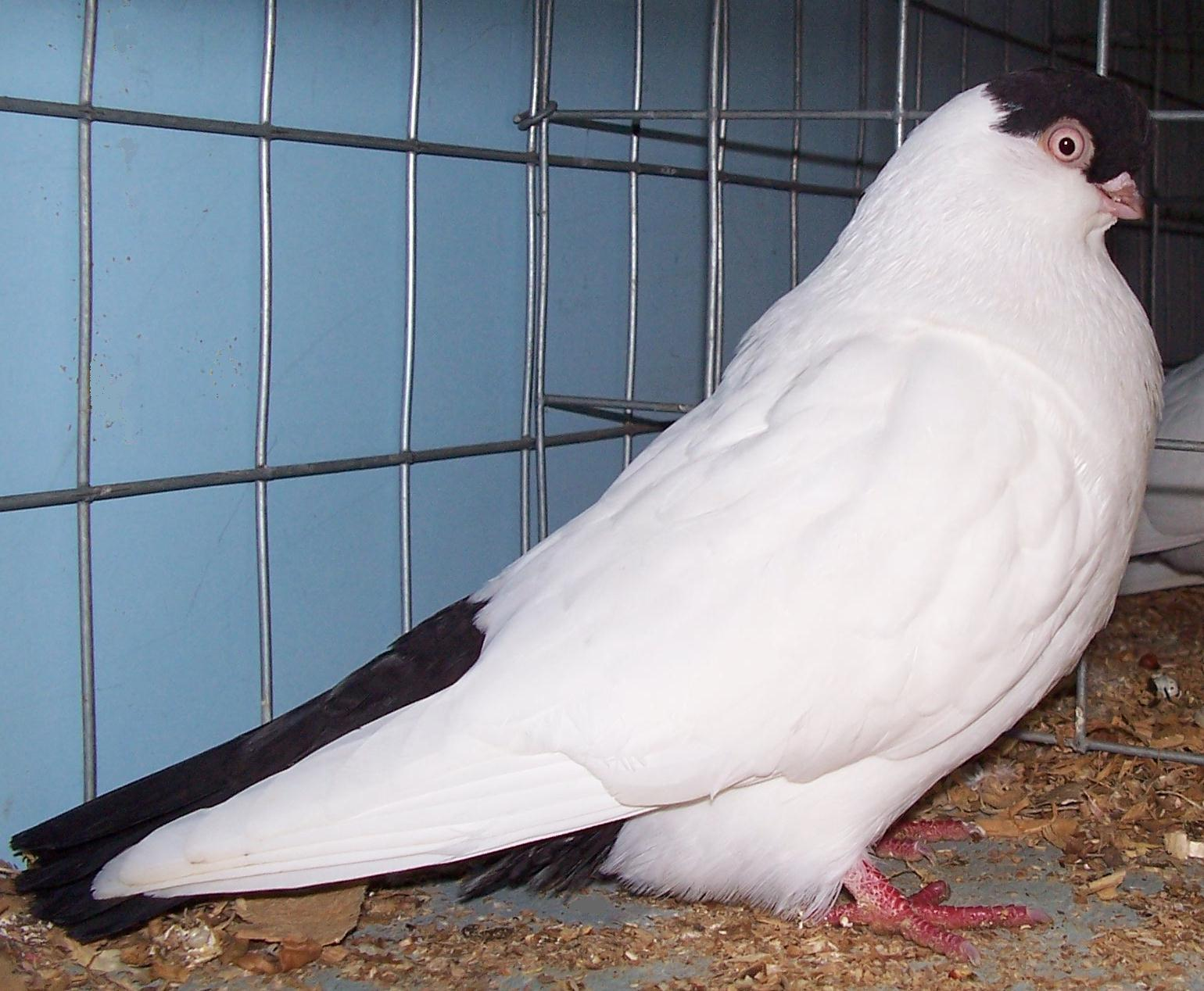
Black non-crested

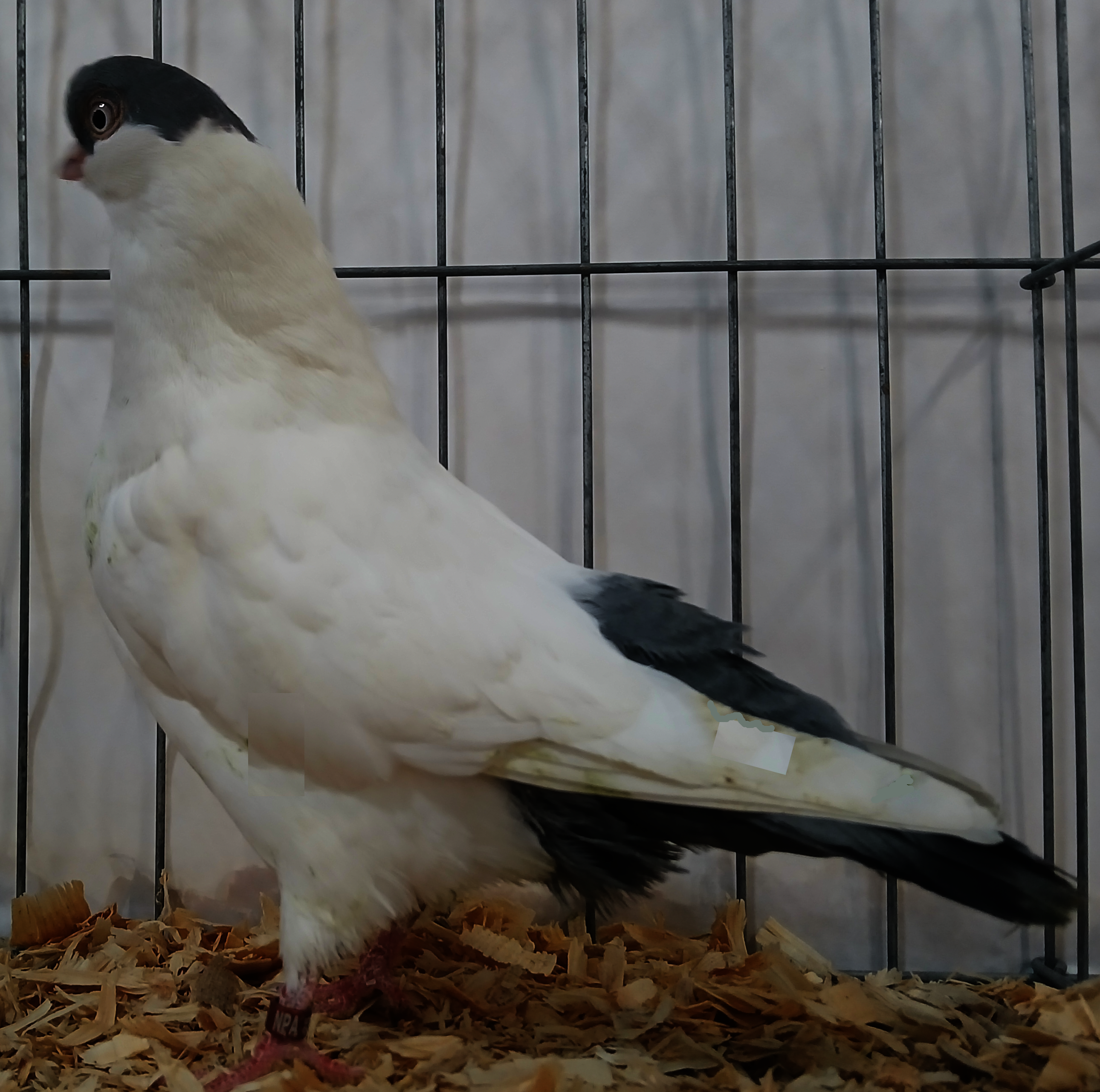
Blue plain head

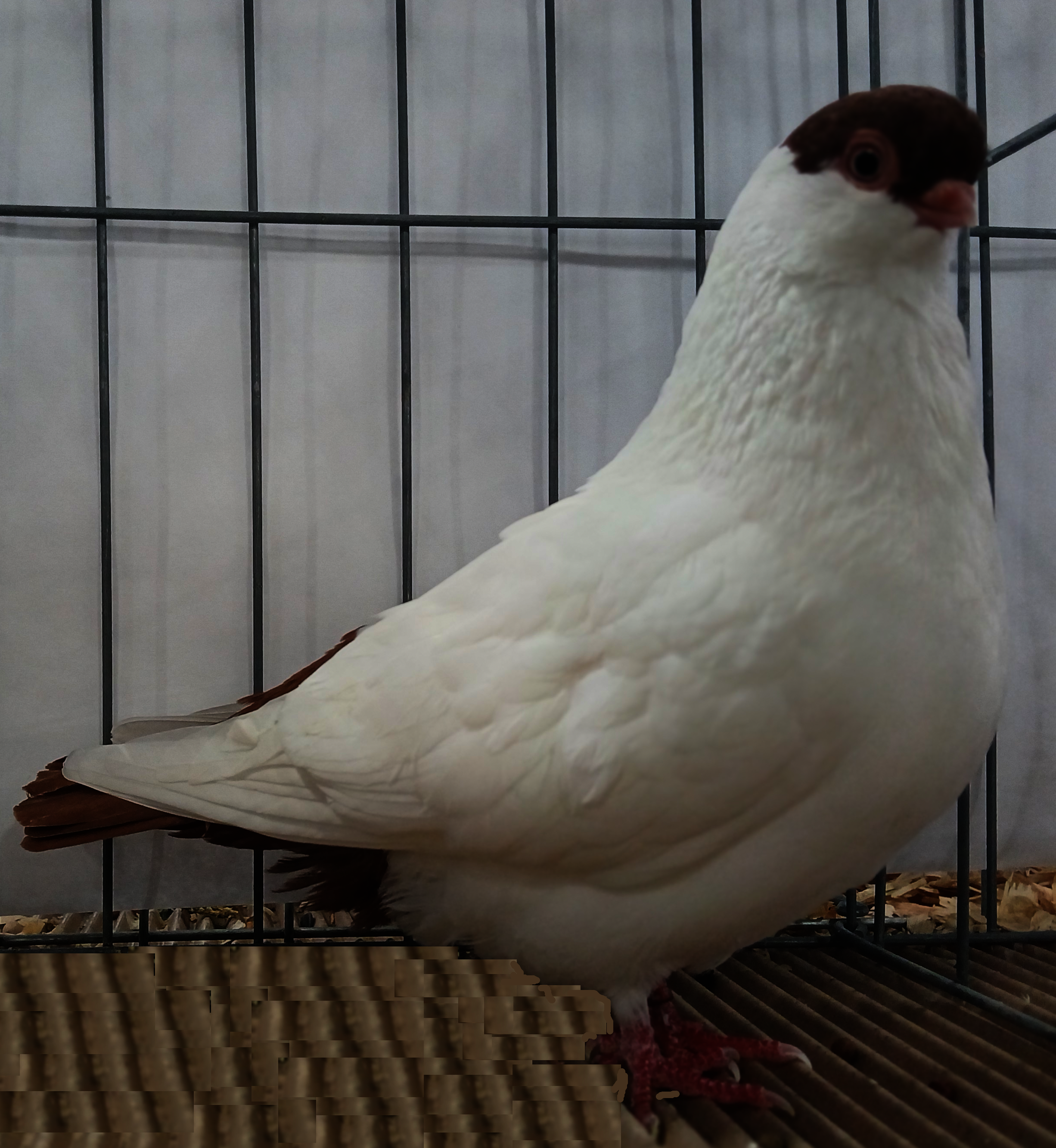
Red plain head

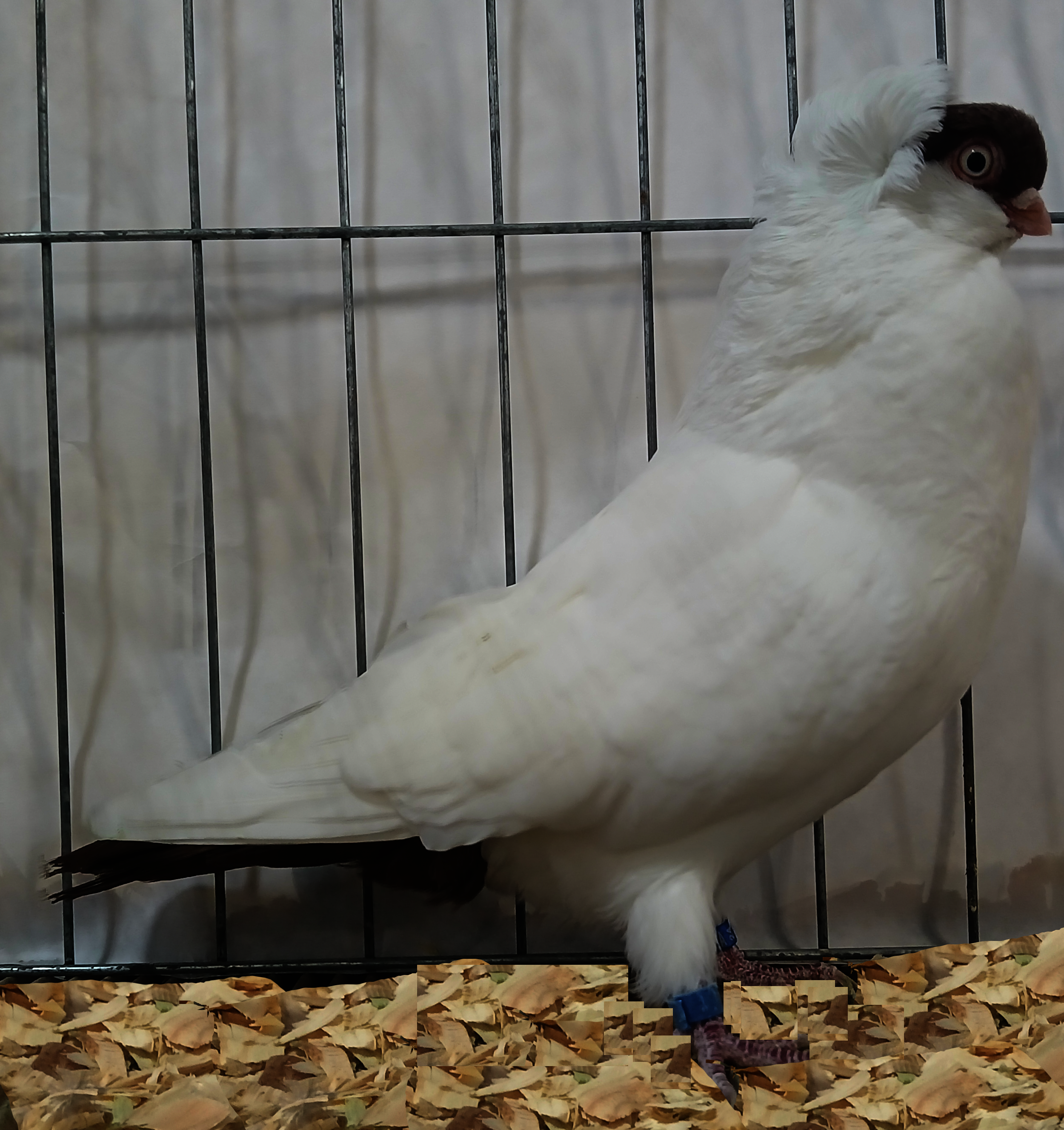
Red capped

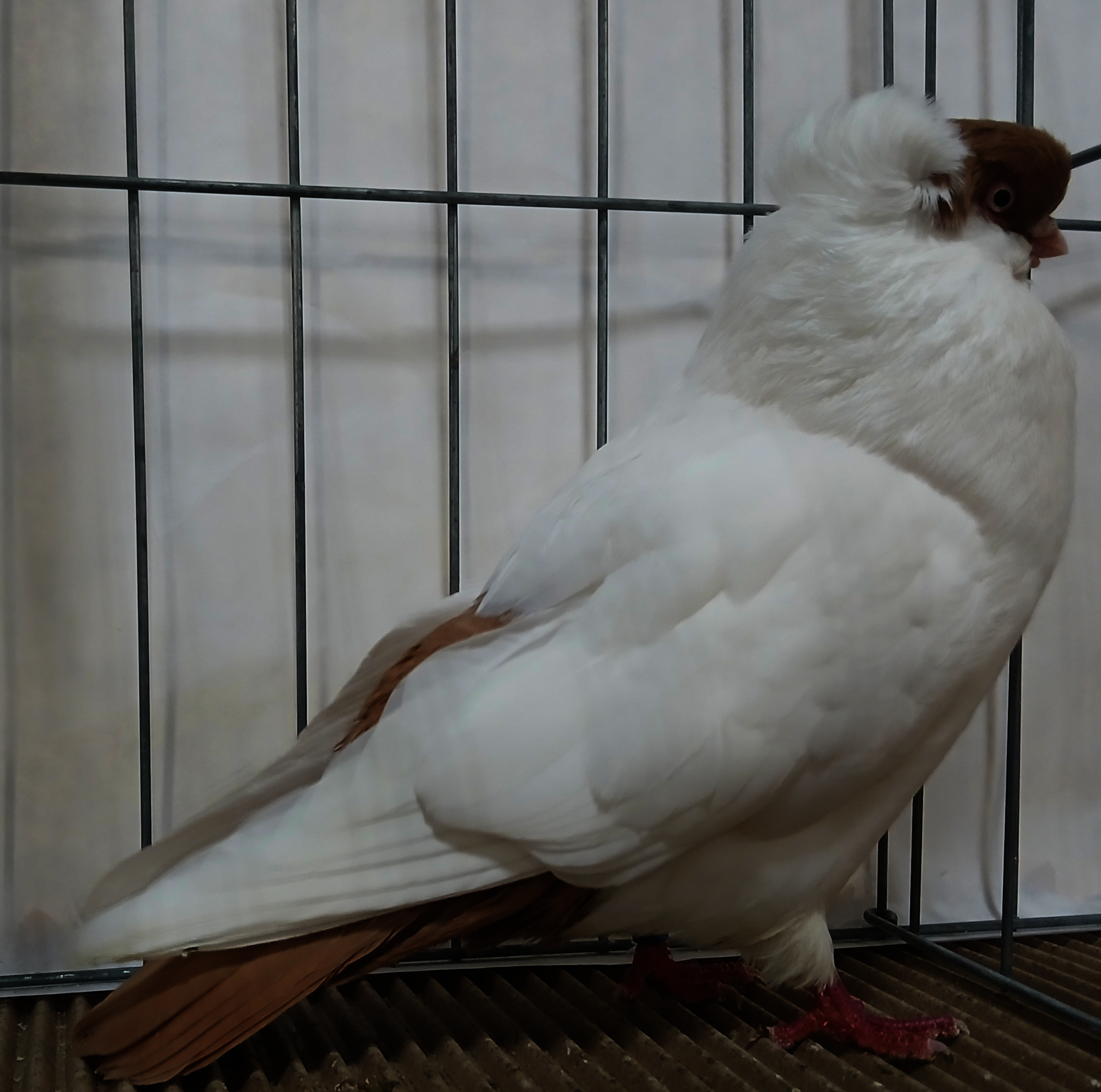
Yellow capped

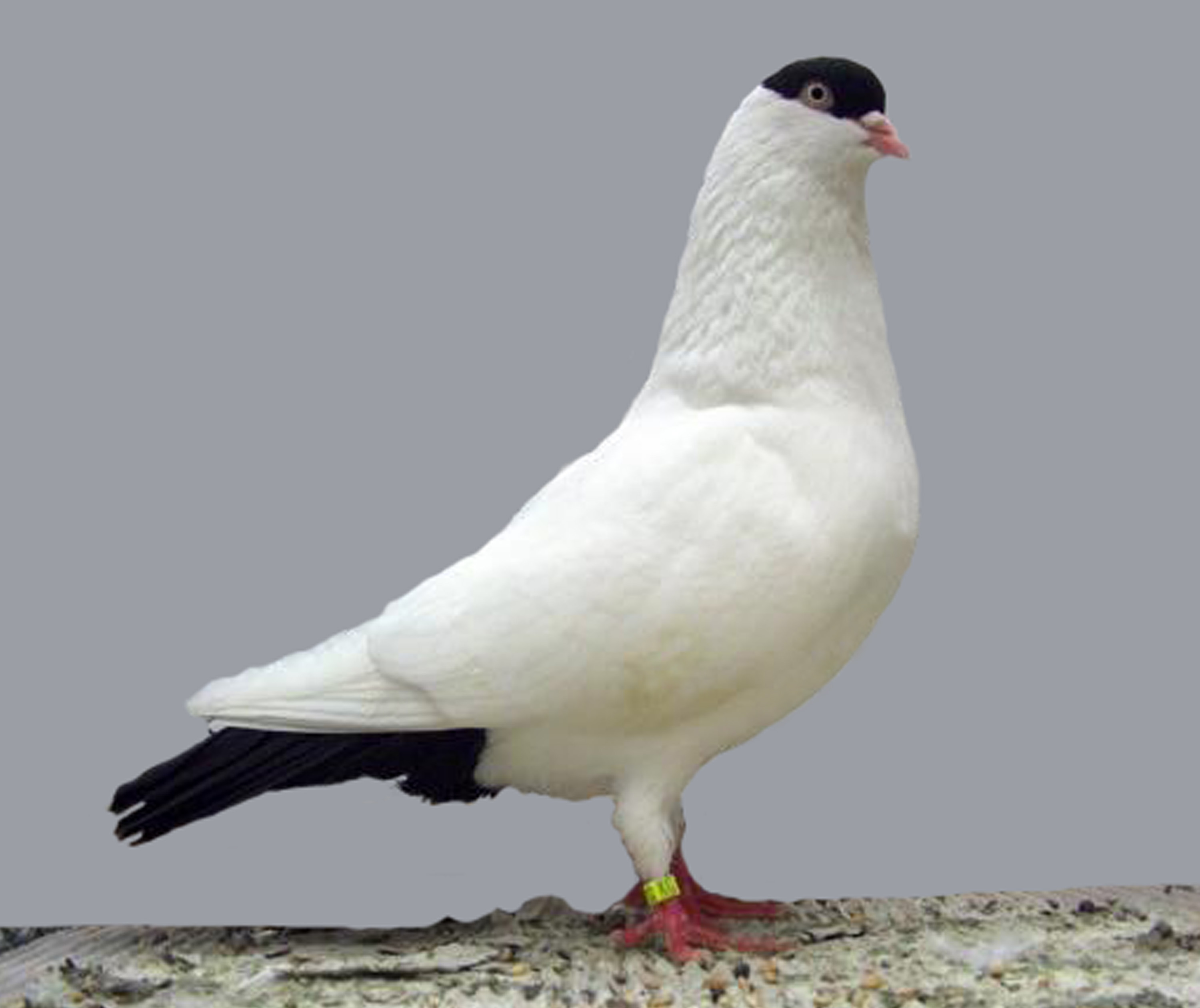
Cologne type

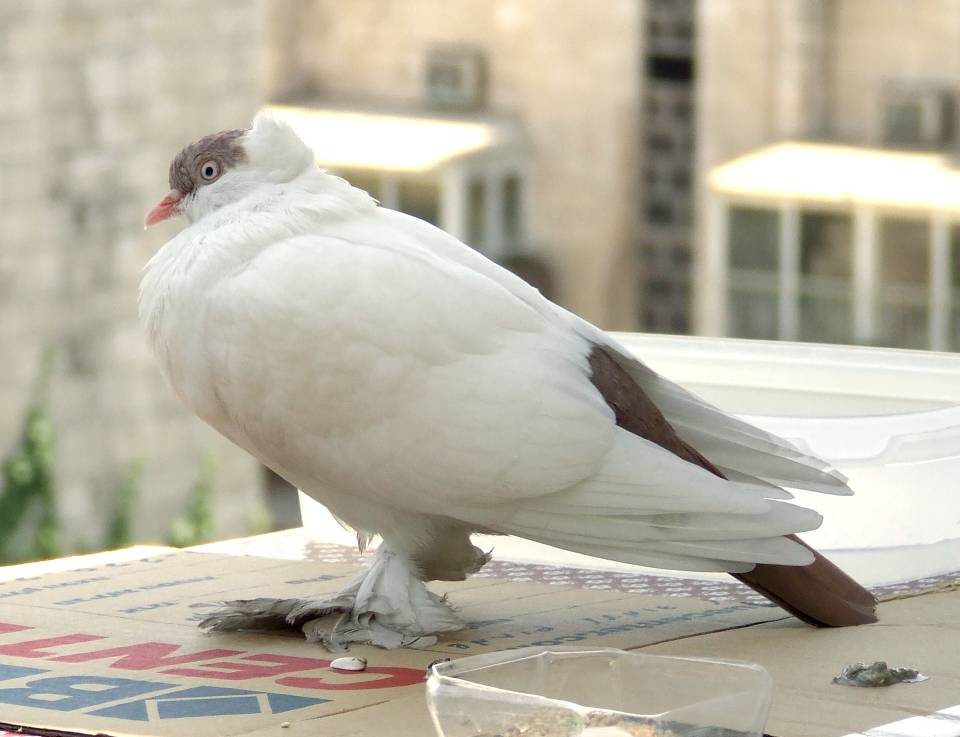
Muffed Helmet

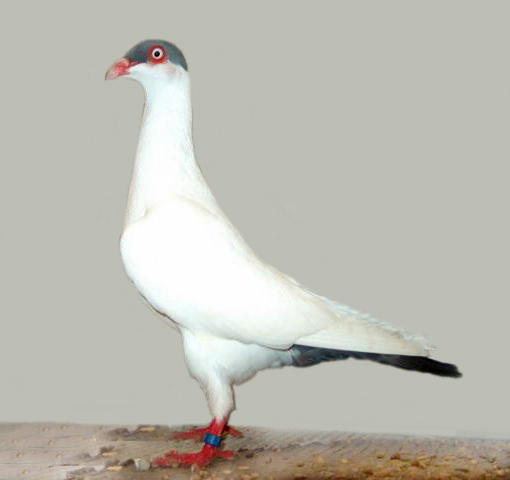
Danish type

== See also ==
- Pigeon keeping
  - Pigeon Diet
  - Pigeon Housing
- List of pigeon breeds
- English Nun
- German Nun
- Polish Helmet
- Dutch Helmet
- American Pigeon Journal 1947 October
- American Pigeon Journal Helmet Special
- Media related to Helmet (pigeon) at Wikimedia Commons
