= Dutch highflyer =

Breed of fancy pigeon

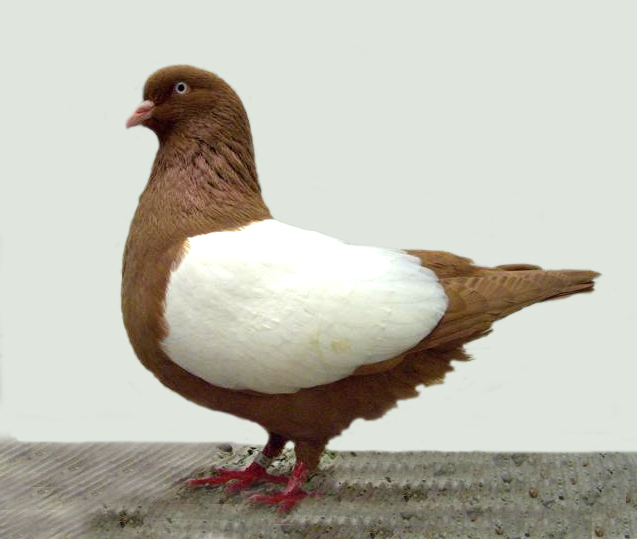
- A red Dutch highflyer.
- Conservation status: Not Evaluated (IUCN); High Risk (SZH)
- Country of origin: Netherlands

Traits
- Crest type: Plain-headed

Classification
- US Breed Group: Tumblers, Rollers, and Highflyers
- EE Breed Group: Tumblers and Highflyers

The Dutch highflyer, sometimes called the Dutch tumbler, or the Nederlandse hoogvlieger in Dutch, is a breed of fancy pigeon created through generations of selective breeding originating from the Netherlands. It is recognised as a member of the Tumblers and Highflyers breed group (EE0800 or individually as NL/0824) by the European Standard Committee for Pigeons and is recognised under the Tumblers, Rollers, and Highflyers breed group by the US National Pigeon Association. Dutch highflyers are heavily built medium-sized pigeons with stocky builds and thick necks. They are clean-legged and plain-headed, lacking any muffs/cuffs on the feet and any crest on the head. It is not to be confused with the old Dutch tumbler, a similar breed of fancy pigeon that possesses defined muffs and a similar body type. Due to their lack of muffs, Dutch highflyers are sometimes nicknamed kaalpoot pigeons, with kaalpoot meaning "barefoot" in Dutch. Dutch highflyers occur in reds, browns, yellows, blacks, greys, and silvers/blues, while the wing shields are almost always white as is judging standard within the fancying hobby. The plumage is iridescent and shines a metallic green or pink in light.

The pure bred Dutch highflyer is considered a heritage breed by the Foundation for Rare Domestic Animal Breeds (or Stichting voor Zeldzame Huisdierrassen (SZH) in Dutch), and is classed as being at "Critical" risk of being totally lost, with only fifty hens remaining. While the breed as a whole is far more plentiful than this estimate, Dutch highflyers have historically been crossbred thoroughly with other breeds, exasperating the rarity of exemplary or standard individuals. SZH also notes that the highflyer is increasing in population as per the population trend of the last fifteen years.

== History ==
As with all fancy pigeons, the Dutch highflier is a descendant of the wild rock dove (Columba livia), one of earth's most phenotypically diverse bird species. Rock doves were first domesticated at least 5,000 years ago in the Middle East and Mediterranean region likely as a result of the birds nesting near human settlements. Phylogenetically, the Dutch highflyer belongs to the genetic group of tumblers, rollers, and highflyers, which is closest phylogenetically to structure pigeons, bred for their impressive structural morphology (eg. crests).

The Dutch highflyer is said to originate from North Holland, and is more specifically attributed to Amsterdam, where it began as a racing breed. Initially bred to standard in 1920-25, since the 1930s it has been seen as a popular show breed at exhibitions. Before its standardised description, the Dutch highflyer was commonly flown recreationally or in races in rural Amsterdam, often accompanied by the related old Dutch tumbler and Hague highflyer. The breed was initially bred not only for show but for its flying proficiency however, after around 1980, the standardised characteristics of the modern Dutch highflyer were created via crossbreeding with heavy breeds like the Modena, owing to a severe degradation in the flight capabilities of the breed. Within this initial lineage, the Dutch highflyer was defined by a deep ornamental red plumage, though this has been mostly muddied into more washed out reds and browns in the modern lineage as a result of crossbreeding. Some breeders have preserved this old lineage via crossbreeding modern highflyers with individuals who share the morphology of the idyllic racing variety that preserves the original vision of the breed.

Multiple specialty clubs for the Dutch highflyer have been established. The most prominent specialty club -the Special club of Breeders of the Dutch Highflyer, was formed by a Dr. Fritz Fröhlich on 28 April 1984 in Leopoldshöhe-Asemissen, Germany following a 1983 presentation of 60 birds at the VDT show in Münster. The club's first special show took place in Verden an der Aller, Germany on the 8th and 9th of December, 1984 where eight breeders showcased 86 birds of various colours. The club has accrued a consistent following of around 40 breeders throughout its existence. Another specialty club, the Dutch High Flyer - Tumbler Club, has since been established and encompasses the showcase of various Dutch tumbler breeds including the Dutch helmet and Amsterdam tippler. This specialty club compiles the modern breed standards of the Dutch highflyer and last had a recorded club show in 2022.

== Morphological Standard ==
The Dutch highflyer is subject to a variety of morphological standards outlined by clubs for their exhibition. Some regular points of scrutiny are the head, forehead, neck, eyes, and beak. Some defining characteristics of the standard Dutch highflyer are its pearl-coloured eyes and bare-legs, the latter of which distinguishes it from the old Dutch tumbler, a breed defined by prominent leg muffs. Standard Dutch highflyers possess slender necks which broaden towards the base, medium length, pink or flesh coloured straight beaks, and elongated heads with minimal forehead slopes. They sport a slightly sloped stance with a modrately prominent breast and fairly broad back. The tail feathers are held closely together.

=== Plumage ===
Dutch highflyers exhibit six prominent plumage colours; red, yellow, black, blue, silver, and grey. Highflyers most often possess white wing shields, however, a much wider variety of colour combinations are recognised, with some lacking white wing shields entirely. Red, yellow, and black highflyers for instance, can occur in combinations with white or alternatively as entirely solid colours. During the era of crossbreeding between this breed and others, the prominence of these red and yellow plumage varieties is said to have declined in frequency or have even been temporarily lost until revisionary breeding. Interestingly, red and yellow highflyers hatch in a uniform colour, and only gain additional white markings or wing shields proceeding the first moult. Additionally, tiger-marked and white-shielded black highflyers do not hatch dark in plumage, and gain their solid colouration as they age.

Blue, silver (also referred to as blue-silver), and grey highflyers are almost exclusively exhibited alongside white plumage.

=== Other markings and plumage varieties ===
While solid white sing shields are the most commonly exhibited amongst highflyers, "tiger-marked" plumage -defined by rosette patterns, is also occasionally exhibited. White-tails and white flights are also rarely expressed amongst red, black, and yellow highflyers.

One additional plumage variation, the chimney sweep, is a very distinct variant, characterised by deep chestnut-coloured plumage, a prominent iridescent sheen across the throat and neck, and an apparent lateral black bar across the tail feathers. Due to its unique appearance, it is sometimes differentiated from the Dutch highflyer as a wholely unique breed.

== Flying and general behaviour ==
As with most tumblers, the Dutch highflyer is known for its distinctive tumbling flight patterns. They fly in tight knit flocks at incredibly high altitudes, sometimes becoming invisible from the ground. Flocks are highly maneuverable and coordinated. It is also noted that a well-trained flock can withstand and escape attacks from sparrowhawks, common predators of domestic pigeon flocks. Flight durations typically last 1-2 hours, and even young pigeons are known to easily return to their loft after voluntary flights.

Dutch highflyers are not particularly personable in nature, and the lack of docility is sometimes attributed to historic crossbreeding with less-trusting breeds and varieties.

== See also ==
- Pigeon Diet
- Pigeon Housing
- List of Pigeon Breeds
