= Old Dutch owl =

Breed of Pigeon

Old Dutch Turbit
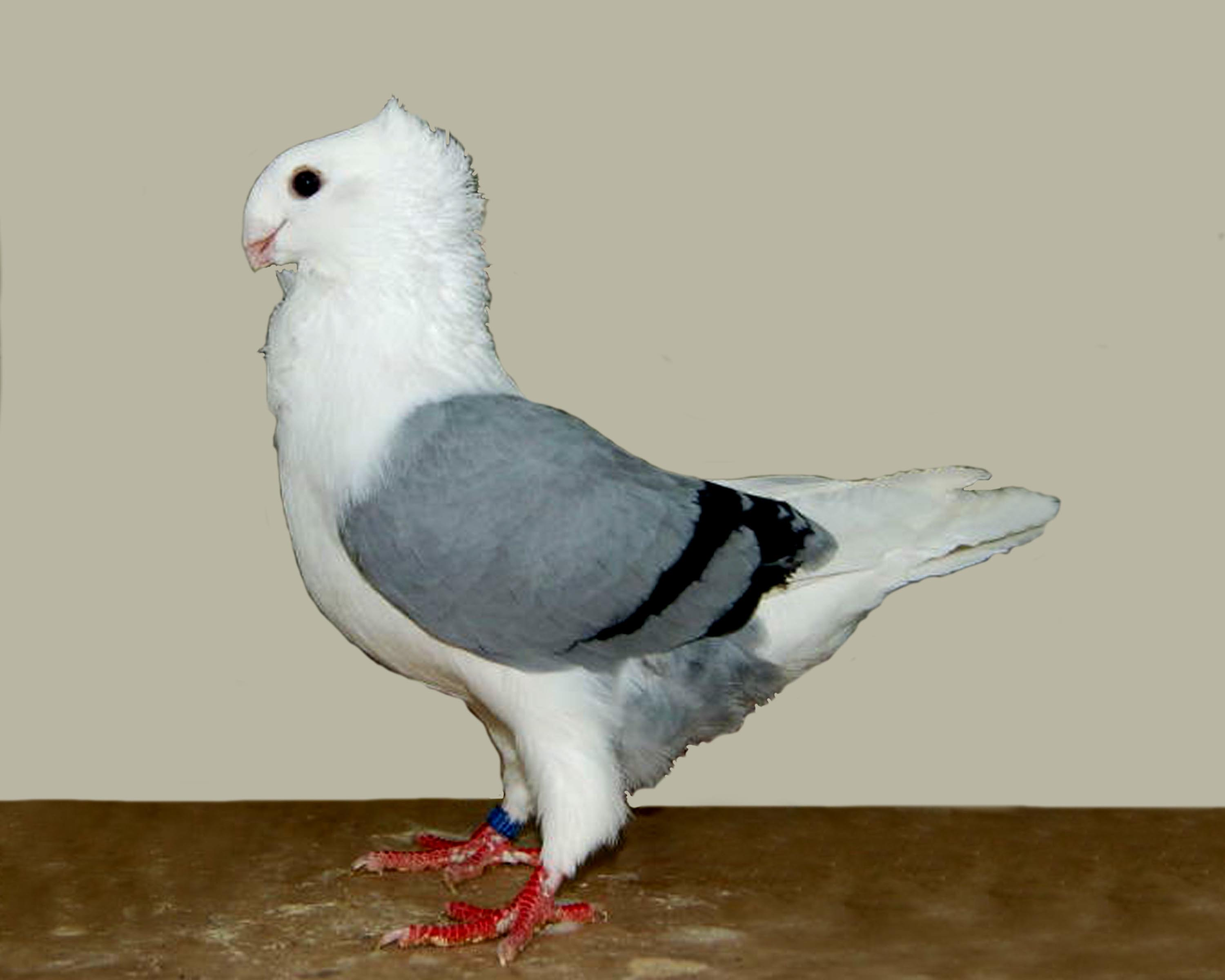
- A standard old Dutch owl.
- Conservation status: Not Evaluated
- Other names: Old Dutch turbit
- Nicknames: Old Dutch seagull/gull, farmer's Owl
- Country of origin: Netherlands

Traits
- Crest type: Peaked
- Feather ornamentation: Coloured wing shields

Classification
- US Breed Group: Owls and Frills
- EE Breed Group: Owl Pigeons

The Old Dutch Turbit, Old Dutch Owl, Old Dutch gull, or simply gull is a breed of fancy pigeon recognised as belonging to the owl pigeons breed group (EE0700 or individually as NL0/703) by the European Standard Committee for Pigeons. Additionally, it is recognised as belonging to the owls and frills breed group by the US National Pigeon Association. Developed in the Netherlands over generations of selective breeding, the old Dutch owl is characterised by vertically growing head feathers that curl gently, creating a peak at the rear of the head, a mane on the nape, and swooping feather adornments around the front of the neck (an area referred to in pigeon anatomy as the "jabot"). This breed possesses a rounded broad forehead, a stout or highly regressed beak likened to that of a bullfinch, large expressive eyes, and an upright posture. Old Dutch owls are characterised by glaucous coloured wing shields with black or dark greyish blue bars as well as an uncoloured white body and white primaries. The breed's name in Dutch is "oud Hollandse meeuw", meaning "old Dutch seagull", reflecting its superficially similar plumage to a seagull. The breed is also commonly referred to as the old Dutch Turbit, a term used to describe stout and stocky breeds of pigeon that was once exclusively applied to frilled pigeons with coloured shoulders.

== History ==
All fancy pigeons are the result of the domestication and selective breeding of rock doves (Columbia livia) which were domesticated around 5,000 years ago in the Middle East and Mediterranean. Rock doves are some of the most phenotypically diverse birds on earth. Old Dutch owls in specific belong to the owl and frill pigeon breed group, a monophyletic group defined broadly by characteristics such as apparent peaked head frills, refined jabots, feathery manes, stout bodies, shortened beaks, erect posture, and expressive eyes on rounded heads with rounded and sloped foreheads. The old Dutch owl is often heralded as one of the oldest European pigeon breeds and has been referred to as "ancient" by H.T.G. Moezelaar, member of the Dutch specialty club for the old Dutch Owl. The claim of the breed's age is typically owed to accounts by Italian naturalist Ulisse Aldrovandi (1522-1608), who recounts domesticated fancy pigeons in the second volume of his work on birds, Ornithologiae written in 1600. The section on domesticated pigeons compiles woodcut portraits by Aldrovandi depicting pigeons with obvious owl and frill pigeon morphology, including horizontal posture, jabots, and prominent manes which lack notches or indents. Aldrovandi's accounts confirm the presence of owl pigeons and Turbits in Europe during as early as the 16th and 17th centuries. Old Dutch owls were first recognised as a verified breed by the Dutch Standard Committee in 1938.

== Morphological Standard ==
A highly regulated exhibition breed, the old Dutch owl must meet a variety of breed standard qualities as set by the European Standard Committee for Pigeons (ESCP or EE). A frequent anatomical point of scrutiny is the head, jabot, nape, colouration, and beak of the breed.

The forehead should possess a clear line where the slope transitions to the flat surface of the skull, a point referred to as "the stop" in pigeon anatomy. A forehead that is too short, too long, or otherwise ill proportioned is also unfavourable. The head frills should also be adequately developed, refined and of preferred length, though this standard exists for all owl pigeons/Turbits. Irregularities in crest length and width are against standards. The eyes of the old Dutch owl are large and expressive. The eyes should be dark with narrow, pale rims for aesthetic purposes. Eye rims that are coarsely textured or discoloured are unfavoured. Old Dutch owls possess regressed and stout beaks, a characteristic feature of owl pigeons and Turbits. It is standard that the beak of an old Dutch owl should be of medium length and close tightly. In addition, the beak line (the dividing space between the upper and lower mandibles of the beak) should be without defect. An ideal beak line should pass through the lower edge of the eyebrow and come to a stop at the tip of the crest.

Identified by its squat form, the body of the old Dutch owl should meet requirements that accentuate its stout shape without deficiencies. The back should be short and broad, tapering towards the tail feathers and possessing a slight concavity between shoulders that slope towards the tail feathers. The wing tips should rest on the tail feathers and not touch the ground or droop, while the tail itself should preferably extend just 1-2 centimetres (0.4-0.8 inches) below the wingtips. The chest should rise to be a few millimetres above the tip of the skull when peaked. The bird's posture should be erect and horizontal.

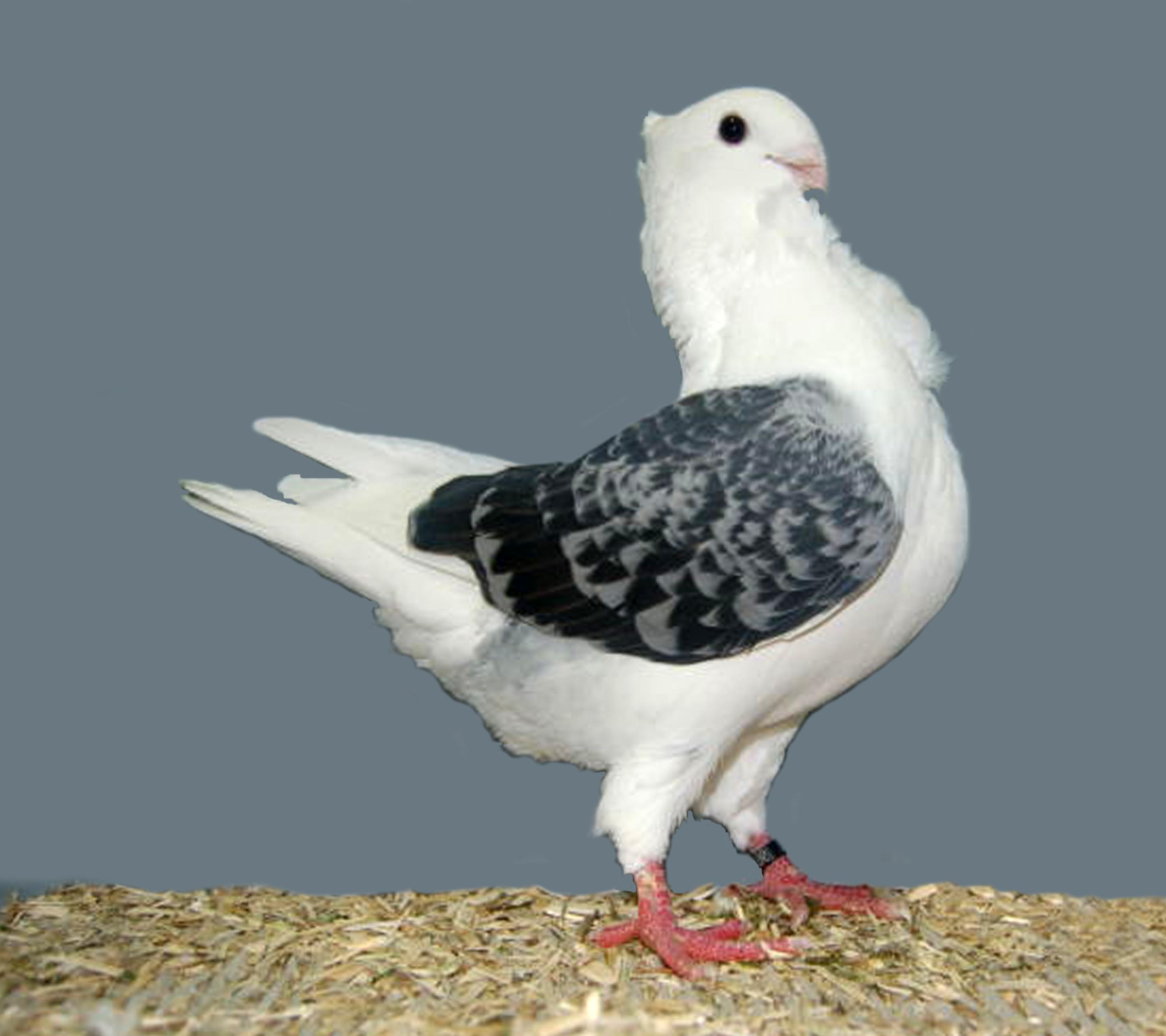
An Old Dutch owl with a blue-chequered shield pattern. Note the more upturned nature of the back, causing the posture to be too upright for criteria.

Plumage-wise, old Dutch owls are held to standards of entirely white bodies and white primary feathers (or wingtips). Mottled colouration where colour exists in the plumage where not explicitly standardised (pied colouration) is against criteria. Colouration behind the legs is allowed however, the legs and feet themselves should not deviate from standardised colouration. All the alula ('thumb' feathers) should ideally be coloured, however, only one is required to meet criteria. The jabot of an old Dutch owl should be correctly formed and adequately run in a vertical line down the neck. The mane should be without indentation, a very frequent point of fault is a notched mane.

In breeding old Dutch owls, deficiencies and faults are common due to crossbreeding with similar breeds such as the Oriental Frill. Such crossbreeding can result in large or bulbous heads, long foreheads, as well as defects in the figure, shape, and line of the beak amongst other things, though these effects have been observed more frequently in oriental frills. Despite the potential adverse effects that may accompany crossbreeding, it is also frequently recommended in order to produce preferred characteristics in a pigeon. For example, pigeons that do not meet criteria due to their long or otherwise irregular body shape are often bred with idyllic short-bodied pigeons to produce more standard offspring. Old Dutch owls are also more susceptible to dying of inflammatory diseases as a result of crossbreeding.

== Housing and Breeding ==
In the 1887 guide to pigeon breed husbandry and breeding, Fancy Pigeons by James C. Lyell, proper housing for the breeding of old Dutch owls (referred to in the book as 'Turbits'. Shelved nesting boxes are preferred, with measurements of 12in x 12in (30cm x 30cm), with a height of 10in (25cm), a landing board should protrude 4in (10cm) from the overall nesting box, and the structure should be elevated off the ground with a slanted roof. This design can hold four separate compartments, each separated for two individual breeding pairs. Each pair is given two "apartments" to themselves because pigeons do not enjoy nesting twice in existing sites and may procure two clutches at once, facilitating the use of two sites per pair. A pigeon may begin nesting again when a pre-existing clutch of chicks is as young as three weeks old, and so the facilitation of this behaviour is necessary in order to maintain a structured and contented colony where breeding is frequent. Lyell notes a great difficulty in breeding Turbits (old Dutch owls) in specific.

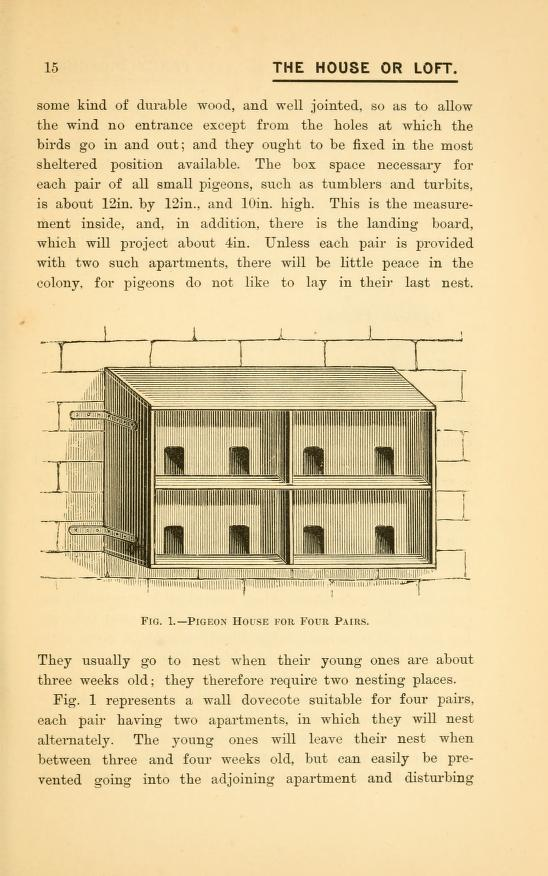
A loft concept recommended by James C. Lydell in Fancy Pigeons for breeding.

When exhibiting fancy pigeons, Lyell recommends the "basket" plan, a 20in x 12in (50cm x 30cm) cage that is divided into four, with each compartment having a wide end of 10in x 4in (25cm x 10cm) and a narrow end of 10in x 1.5in (25cm x 3.8cm). This differs significantly in comparison to the boxy open plan pigeon cages used for exhibition in modern shows. Lyell notes that the basket plan is particularly suitable for Turbits due to their stout forms.

== General Behaviour ==
Along with other owls and frilled pigeons, old Dutch owls are reclusive and shy in personality. They will not typically defend their eggs when their nests are encroached on or threatened and more readily flee until the disturbance leaves, after which they will quickly return to their nests. Despite this, frills and other owls are said to be even more flighty and reserved. When in flight, they soar in a "wheeling" motion which is particularly striking due to the contrast between the whites and colours of their plumage.

== Gallery ==
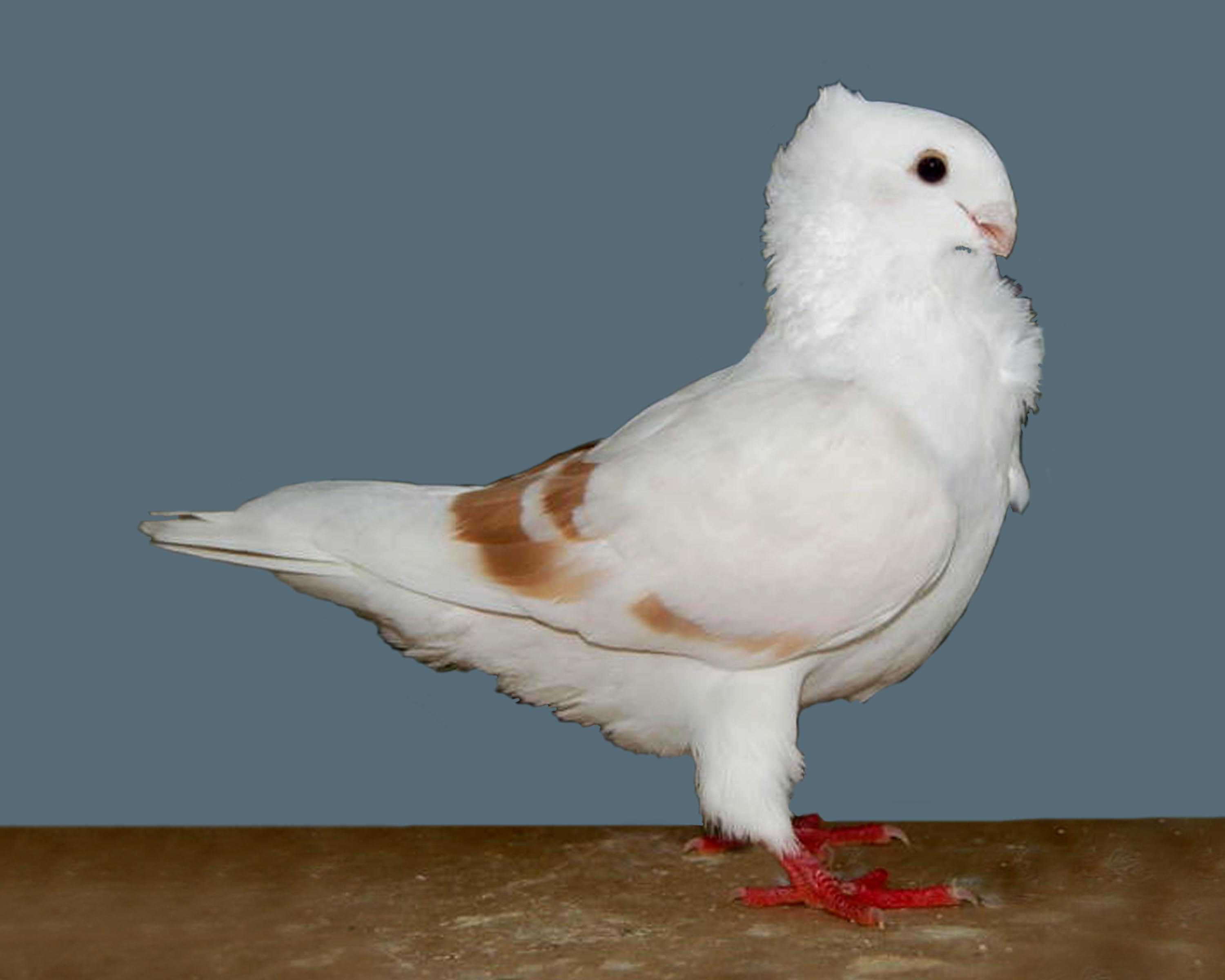
Cream bar

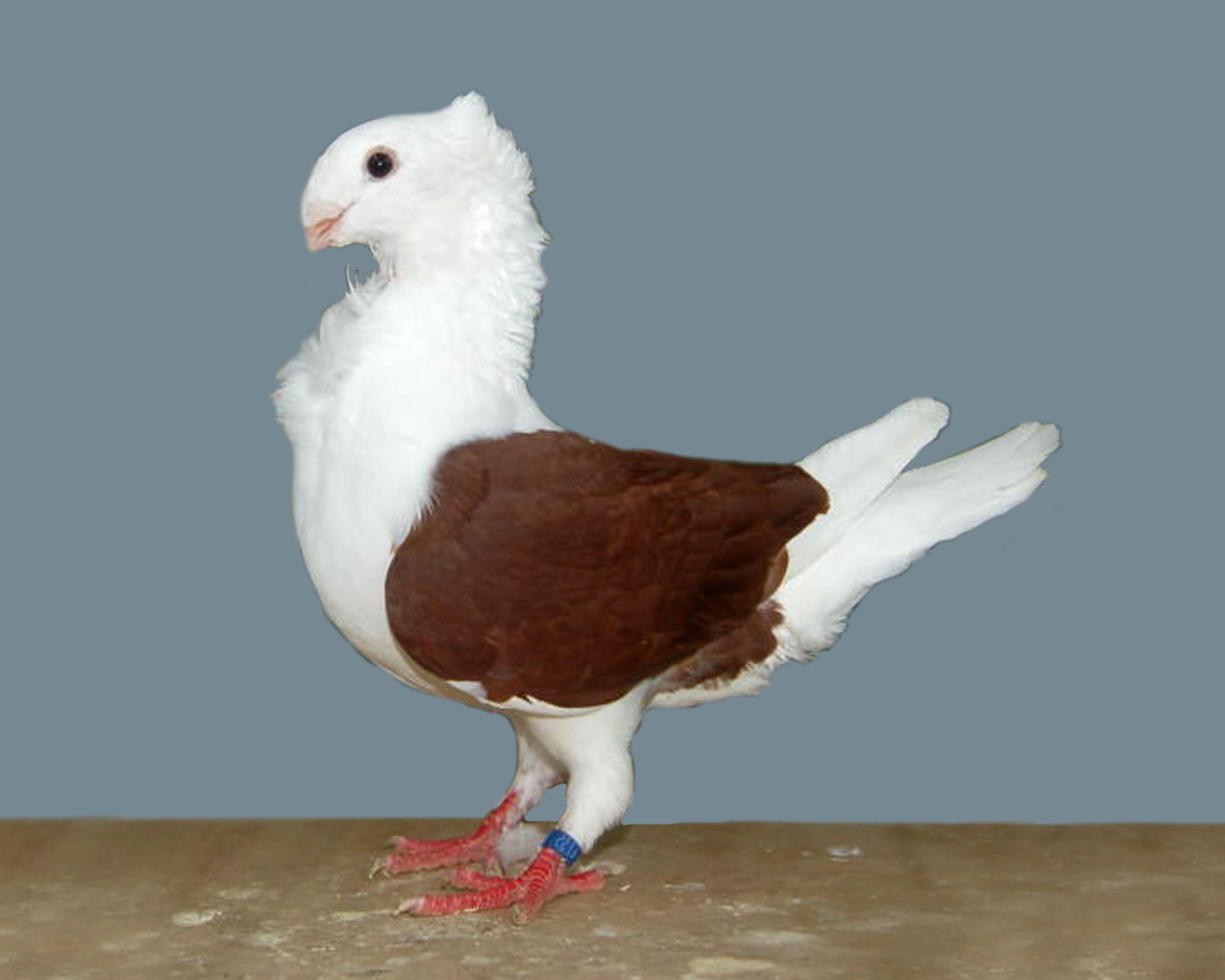
Red

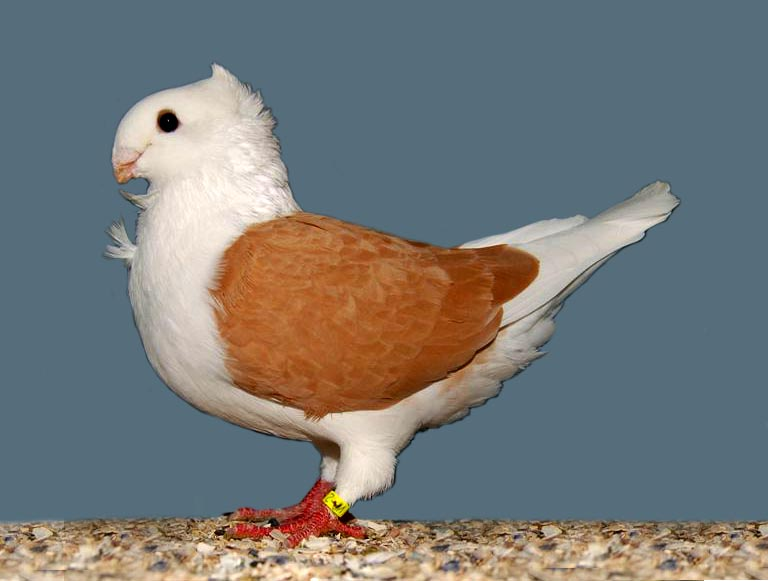
Yellow

== See also ==
- List of Pigeon Breeds
- Oud-Hollandse Meeuwclub - Guideline for Standard
- EE List of Fancy Pigeon Breeds
- US List of Fancy Pigeon Breeds
