= Polish Helmet pigeon =

Breed of pigeon

Polish Helmet
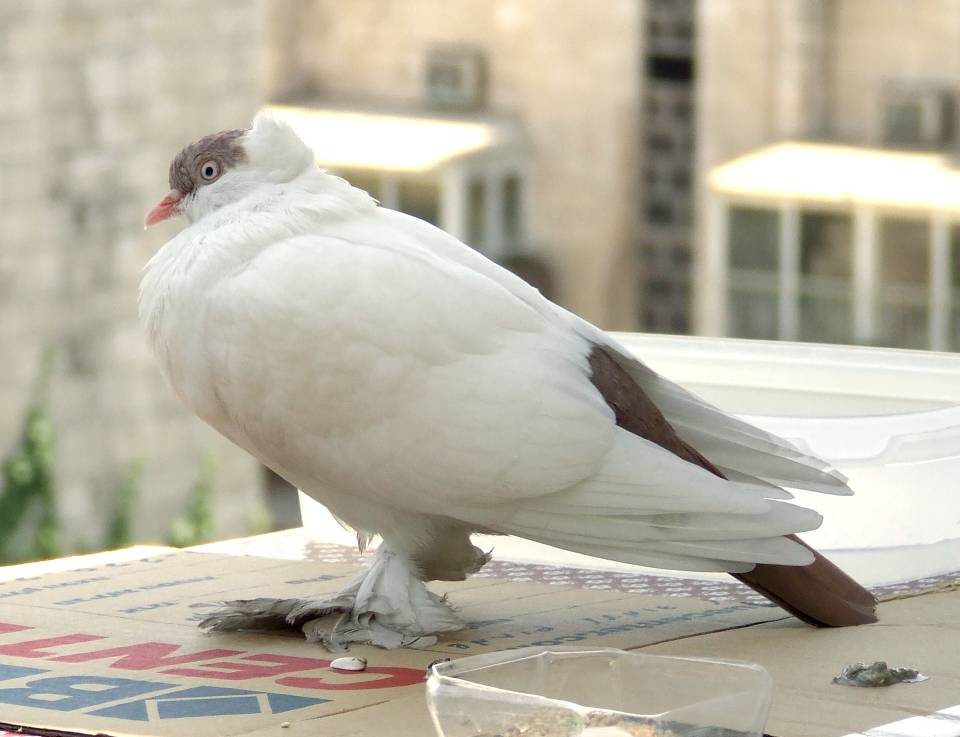
- Polish Helmet
- Conservation status: Common
- Other names: Polish Krymka Tumbler
- Country of origin: Poland

Classification
- US Breed Group: Fancy
- EE Breed Group: Tumbler and Highflyer

The Polish Helmet or Polish Krymka Tumbler (Polish: krymka polska) is a breed of fancy pigeon, specifically a type of Helmet pigeon, that has been developed over many years of selective breeding. It is distinctive on account of its "Muffs" (large foot feathers), and is colored only on the top half of its head (the "helmet") and on its tail. It is thought to be related to the European and American pigeons, though it remains unknown as to what came first or how they spread and adapted all over the world.

== Gallery ==
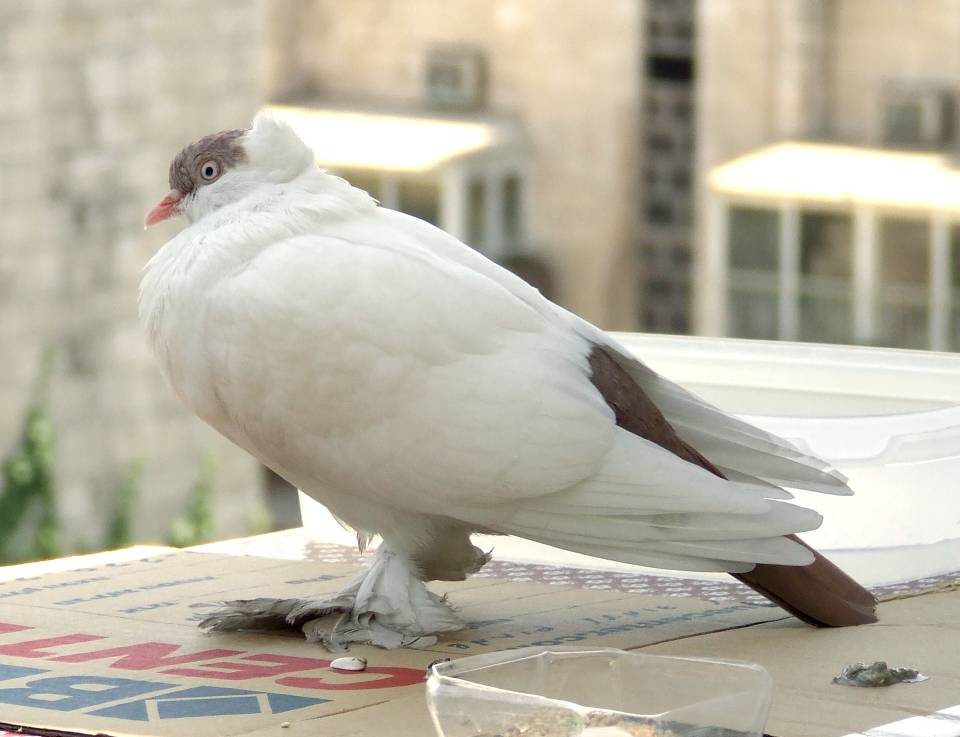
Muffed helmet Polish Krymka

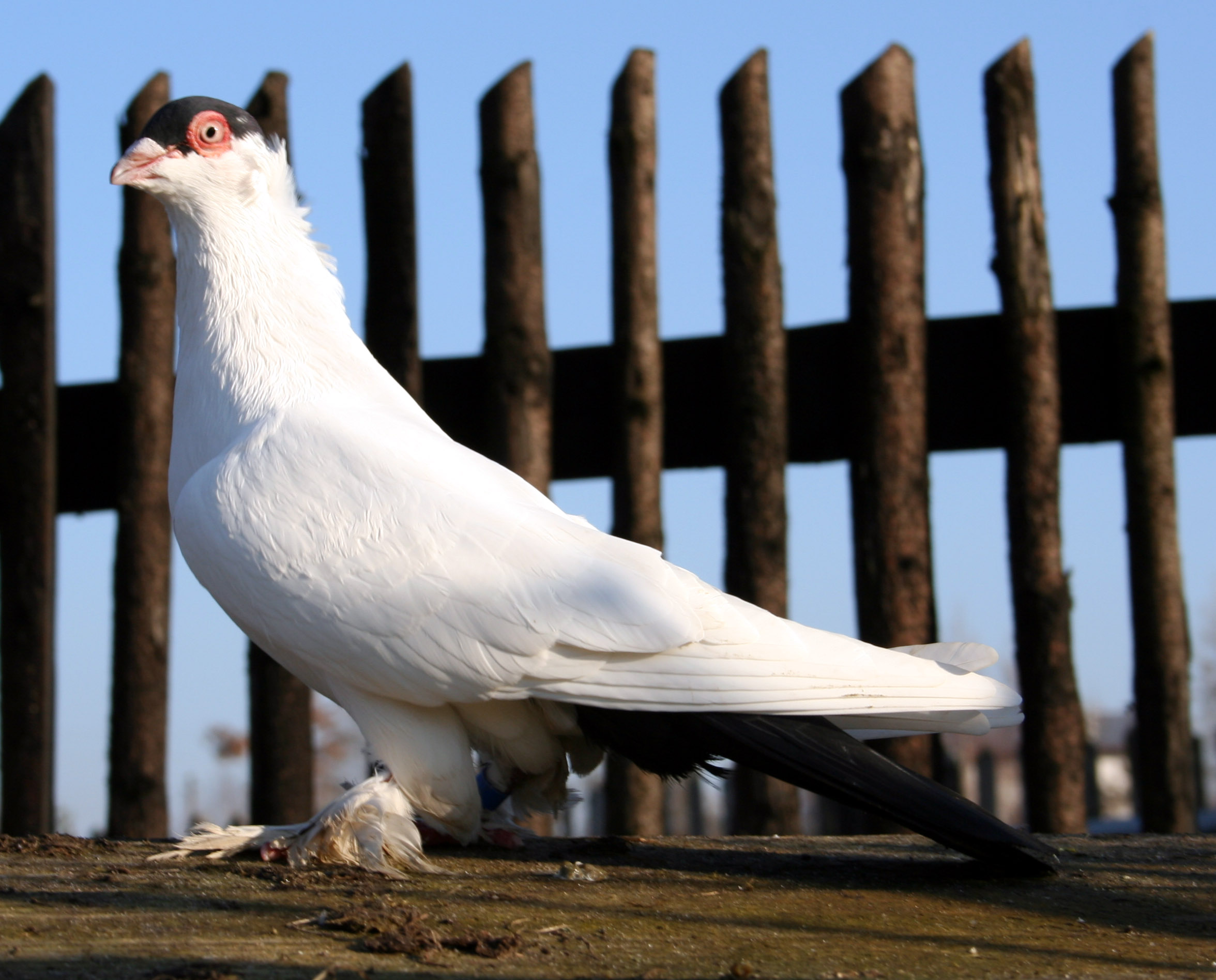
Gołąb768

== See also ==
- Pigeon Diet
- Pigeon Housing
- List of pigeon breeds
