= Mookee pigeon =

Breed of fancy pigeon

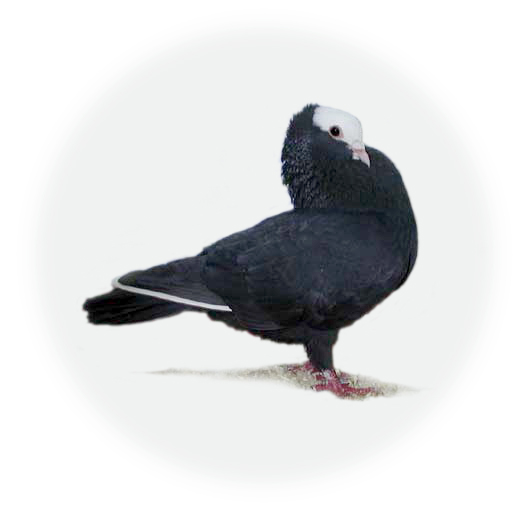
- An andalusian mookee pigeon.
- Conservation status: Not Evaluated
- Other names: Indian Trembler
- Nicknames: Mookee
- Country of origin: India

Classification
- US Breed Group: Tumblers, Rollers, and Highflyers
- EE Breed Group: Tumblers and Highflyers (EE0800 N/L0820)

The Mookee Pigeon, Indian Mookee Pigeon, Indian Trembler, or simply just Mookee is a breed of fancy pigeon created through selective breeding and originating in India. It is recognised as being part of the Tumblers and Highflyers breed group (EE0800 or N/L0820) by the European Standard Committee for Pigeons. It is recognised under the Flyers breed group by the US National Pigeon Association. Mookee pigeons are characterised by erect 'S'-like posture, where the neck is thick and long and the breast is arched outwards. Mookee pigeons walk with their chest pressed outwards and leading them. The plumage varies between individuals and many colours exist, such as blacks, blues, duns (a deep grey-brown), yellows and ash reds. The colouration can be exhibited in multiple areas on the pigeon's body depending on the individual. Some individuals have fully coloured bodies, while others have colour localised totally to the neck, where the body possesses the more typical grey with coloured variants of the bar-winged plumage of rock and hill doves. The head of the mookee is notably white, with a clear demarcation made between it and the colours of the neck plumage beneath the lower eye rim. The beak is proportional to the head and usually a pale pink colour with some accepted variation. The feathers on the neck of the mookee often form manes of varying refinement. Some mookees may have more developed manes than others dependent on their pedigrees. The mookee typically has twelve tail feathers that are held closely together in posture and form a narrow tail.

== History ==
The mookee, like all fancy pigeons, is a descendent of the rock dove (Columbia livia), an incredibly phenotypically diverse bird species that was first domesticated in the Middle East and Mediterranean regions around 5,000 years ago. The mookee belongs specifically to the tumblers and highflyers breed group, a nearly completely monophyletic breed group aside from the mookee itself, which belongs to an outgroup that is much more genetically similar to the fantailed breeds in structure. When the mookee was first described in 1676, the breed was coined the "narrow-tailed shaker" and was believed to be closely related to fantailed breeds (at the time known as broad-tailed shakers) by ornithologist Francis Willoughby (1633-1672) in his book Ornithology. It is possible that Britain became familiarised with the breed through trading with the Dutch East Indes in the 18th and 19th centuries however, the breed may have existed in England as far back as the date of Willoughby's initial description. In The Pigeon, by breeder Wendell M. Levi, the author notes that the breed first gained a foothold in California in 1941-42, where the first imported mookees were being transported on Indian vessels as a source of food for both passengers on board, and for the animals of the San Diego Zoo. A Californian club for the mookee was formed in 1948, shortly after its introduction however, it did not persist. It was initially suspected that the mookee was a bastard fantail breed (a population developed by the interbreeding of two existing breeds) however, the morphology of its tail feathers differentiates it from related breeds and cements it as a unique and distinct breed of fancy pigeon.

== Morphological standard ==
The mookee is subject to a variety of standards in exhibitions and shows with common points of anatomy subjected to scrutiny being the body and carriage, plumage and colouration, the mane, legs, tail, and the beak and wattle.

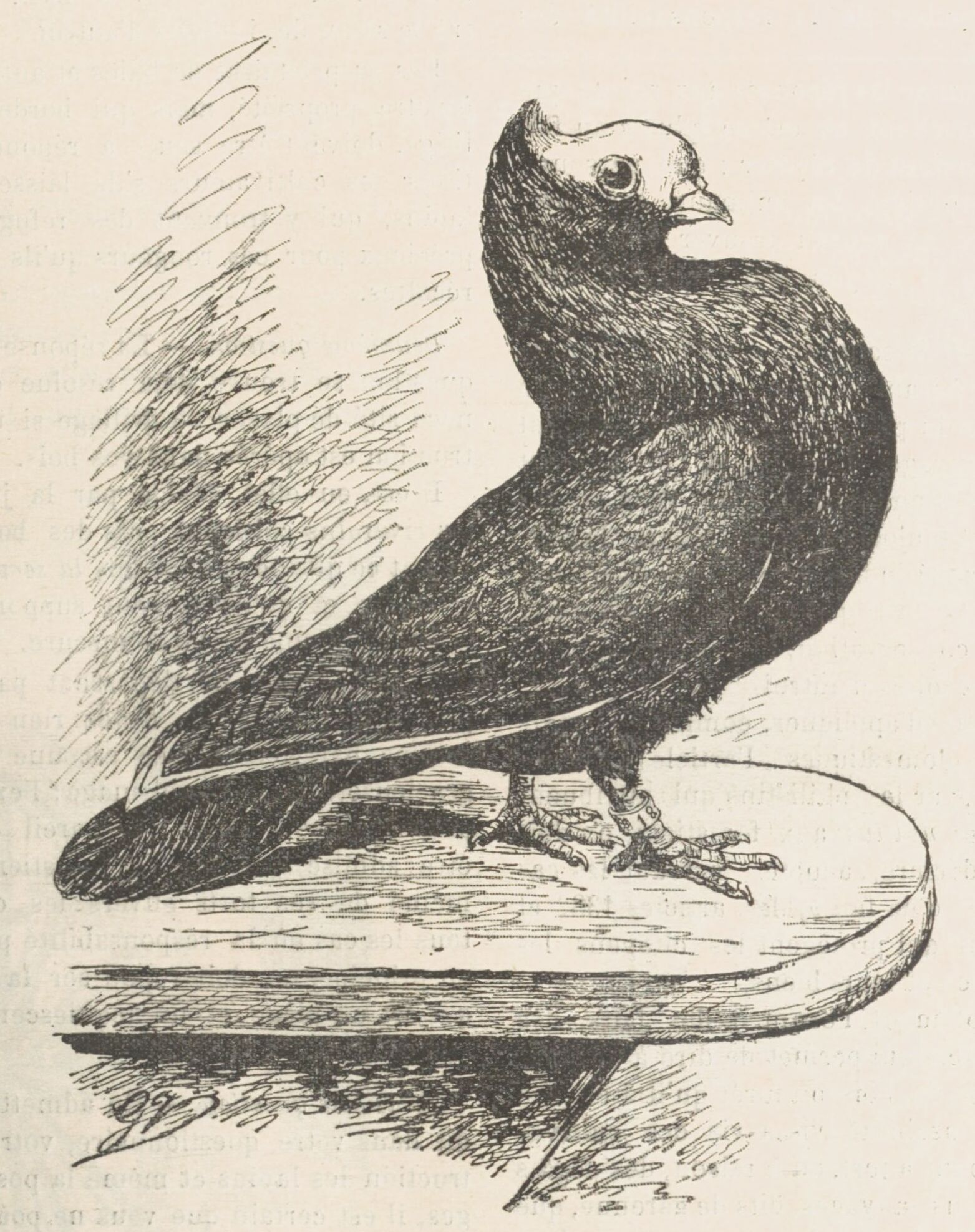
An illustration of a mookee from the January 3rd, 1897 edition of L'Éleveur: weekly illustrated journal of applied zoology.

Mookees should have rounded arching breasts that curve prominently when viewed from a side profile, the body is cobby and the wing butts (anterior corner of a bird's folded wing) should be concealed. The carriage should be sprightly and jaunty, carried upright with the neck in an arched position, in such a way that the line of the back creates a 35%-45% degree angle with the ground when standing. A smaller breed, the average mookee cock should weigh a maximum of 13-14oz (369-397g) and the hen a maximum of 12-13oz (340-369g) in order to comply with standards. The mookee can be bred to be as small as the Chinese owl and Levi states it could be bred to be even more diminutive. The legs of the mookee are bare and unfeathered (clean) and a red or hot pink colour. They should walk on their toes rather than on the soles of their feet to comply with standards. The mookee has a small but discernable wattle that should be small, neat, smooth, and close fitting. The cere (operculum) should be as small as possible and untextured.

The beak itself is typically a pale pink, though the lower mandible allowed to be coloured in black, blue, and ash red coloured individuals. A mookee possesses twelve tail feathers, which are held closely together in a narrow arrangement about half an inch (1.3cm) off the ground. The primaries (wing tips) should be held the same length from the end of the tail.

Mookees are characterised by the mane of feathers around their thick necks. The mane should begin just beneath the point of the beak and extend to the base of the neck. The neck feathers should meet behind the base of the neck and make a "V". A rounded mane is discouraged as its typically an indicative feature of trimming or shaping the mane to be more idyllic, a disqualifiable offence. The neck feathers should also form a discernable centered peak behind the back of the head that is prominent and as pointed as possible, though it should not create a shell crest (grow over the head)

=== Mookee plumage ===
The American Mookee Association, which dictates the breed's standard in the United States, lists twenty-eight different colour variants for the standard mookee. Various colours are exhibited amongst mookees, including blues, duns, browns, yellows, and reds. The body of the mookee is characteristically entirely coloured, while white is reserved for the head and wing tips. It has been noted that the white of the white of the wing tips can be on occasion, a difficult trait to produce and that crossbreeding with standard individuals should be considered in the case of a mookee with coloured wing tips. An overabundance of white plumage in the wing tips has also been noted, where the 3rd and 4th primaries are also uncoloured as opposed to the standardised 1st and 2nd. This trait is also linked to a white chin, which in mookees, is against standard. All white mookees and mookees with fawn (tan) coloured rumps should be culled when breeding for standard colouration. The wing shield can be patterned, and check, T-check, barred, etc. patterns are exhibited throughout the breed in a variety of colours.

== Behaviour and breeding ==
The mookee is characterised by its jittery shaking, a distinctive feature of fantailed pigeon breeds that led to the breed group initially being coined "shakers". The tremours that mookees experience have been a point of concern for some breeders because it inhibits some basic behaviours. Most concerningly, it makes feeding its young hazardous and cumbersome, as well as inhibiting self-care.

The mookee is a good breeder that breeds prolifically during season. It has been noted that the mookee is "unusually" friendly and confident in their breeder by Levi. Levi also noted that the mookee exhibits strange behaviours unseen in other breeds such as tugging at each other's cuffs and chasing mice.

== Gallery ==
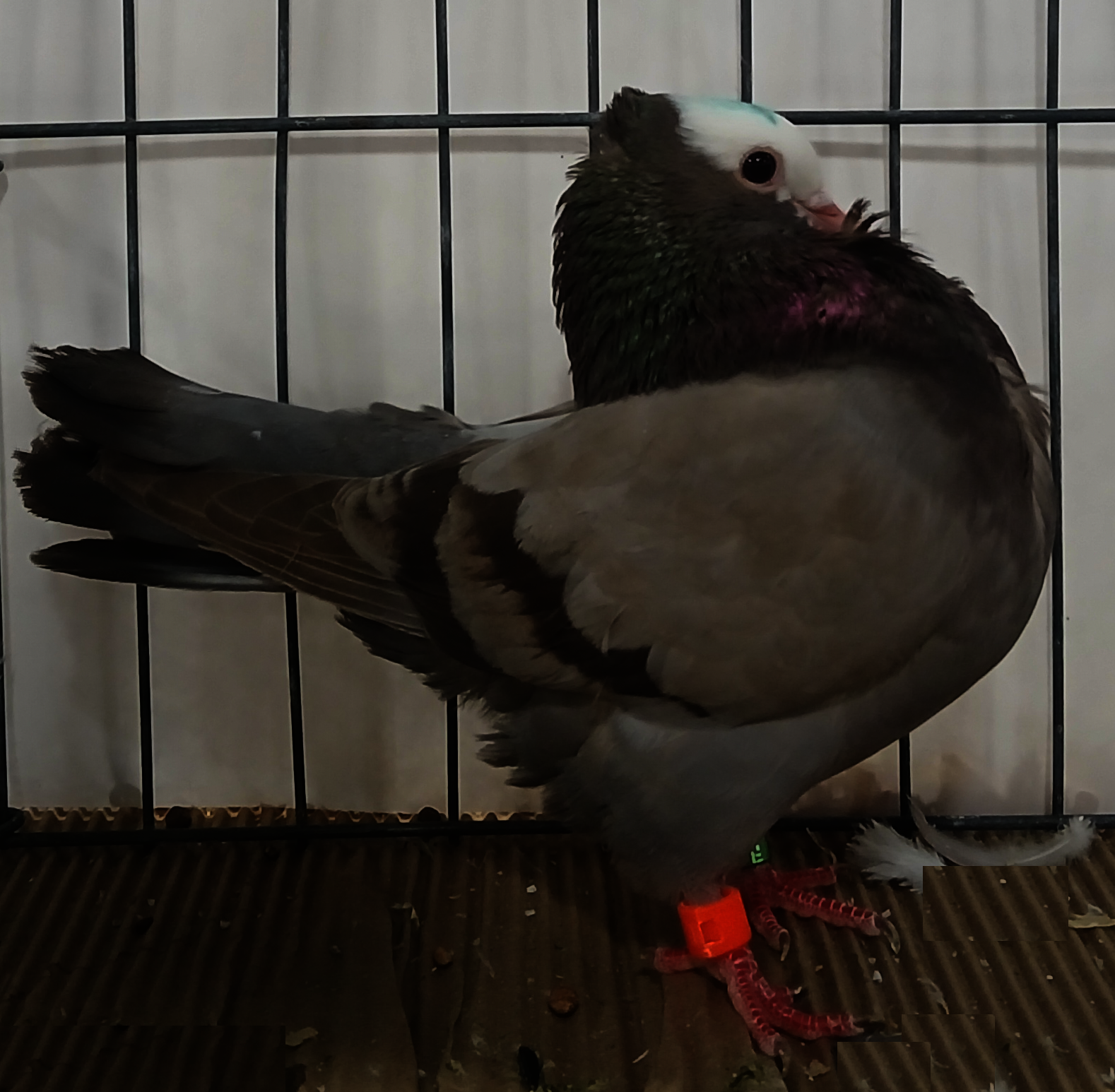

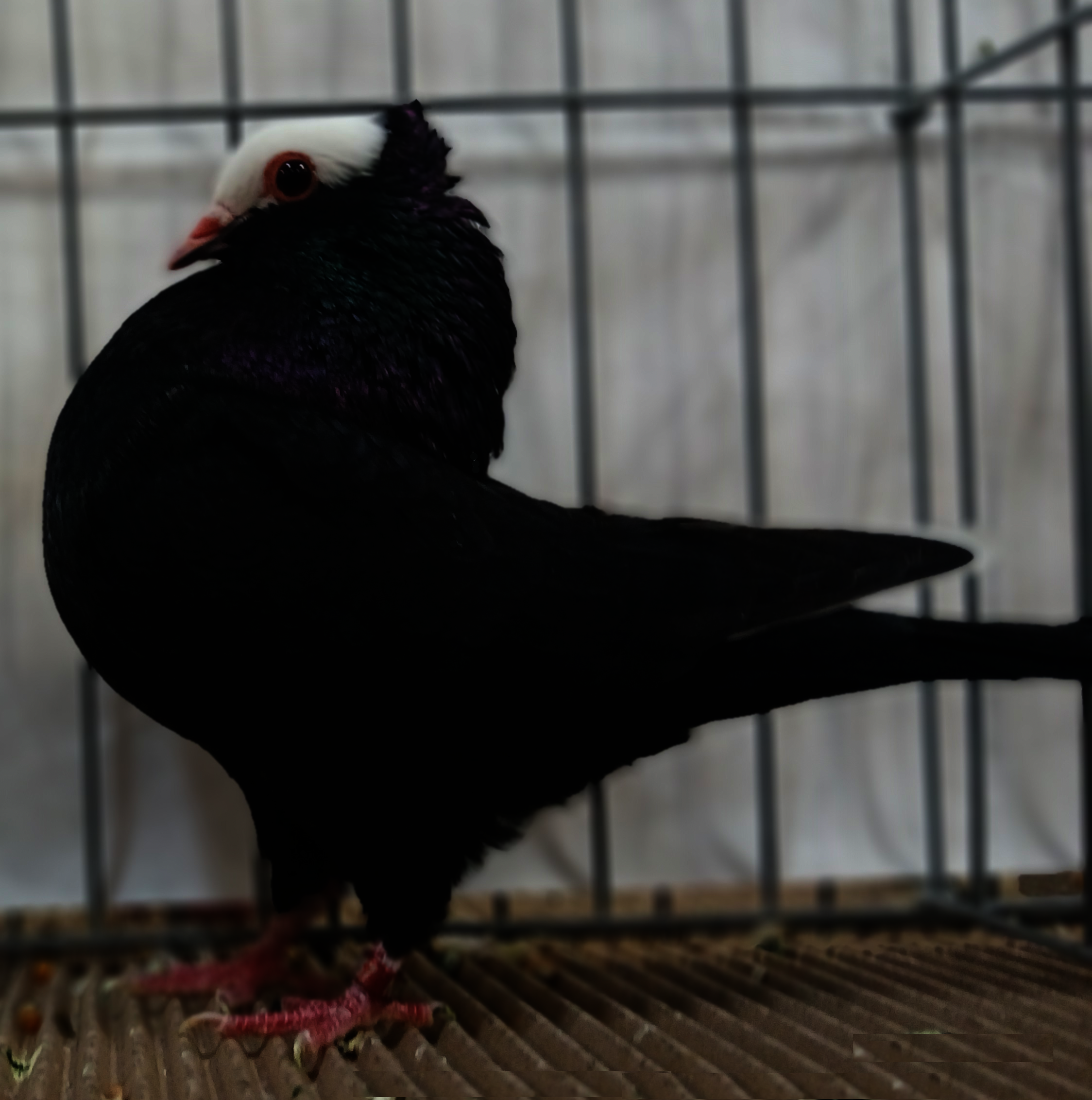

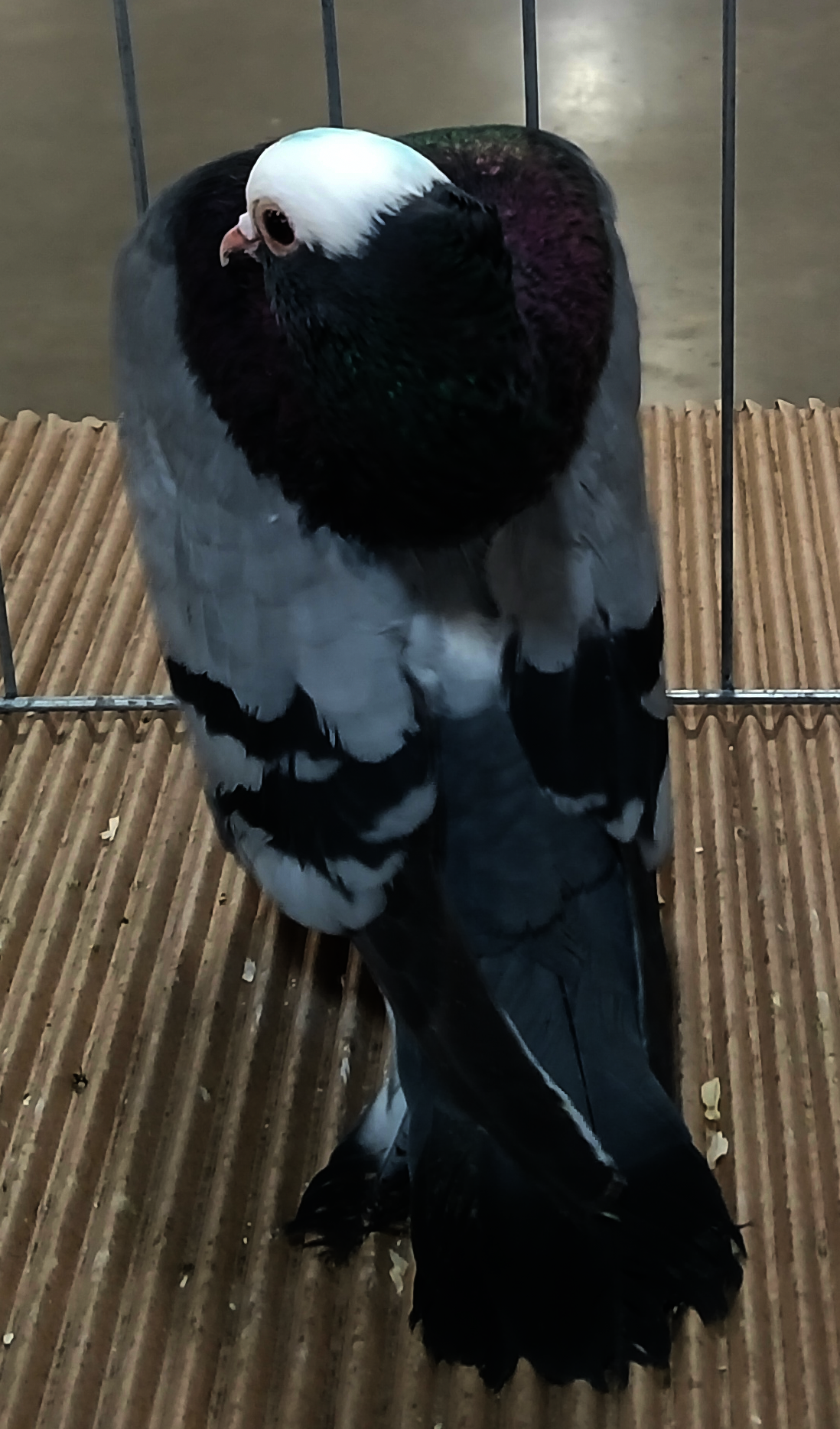

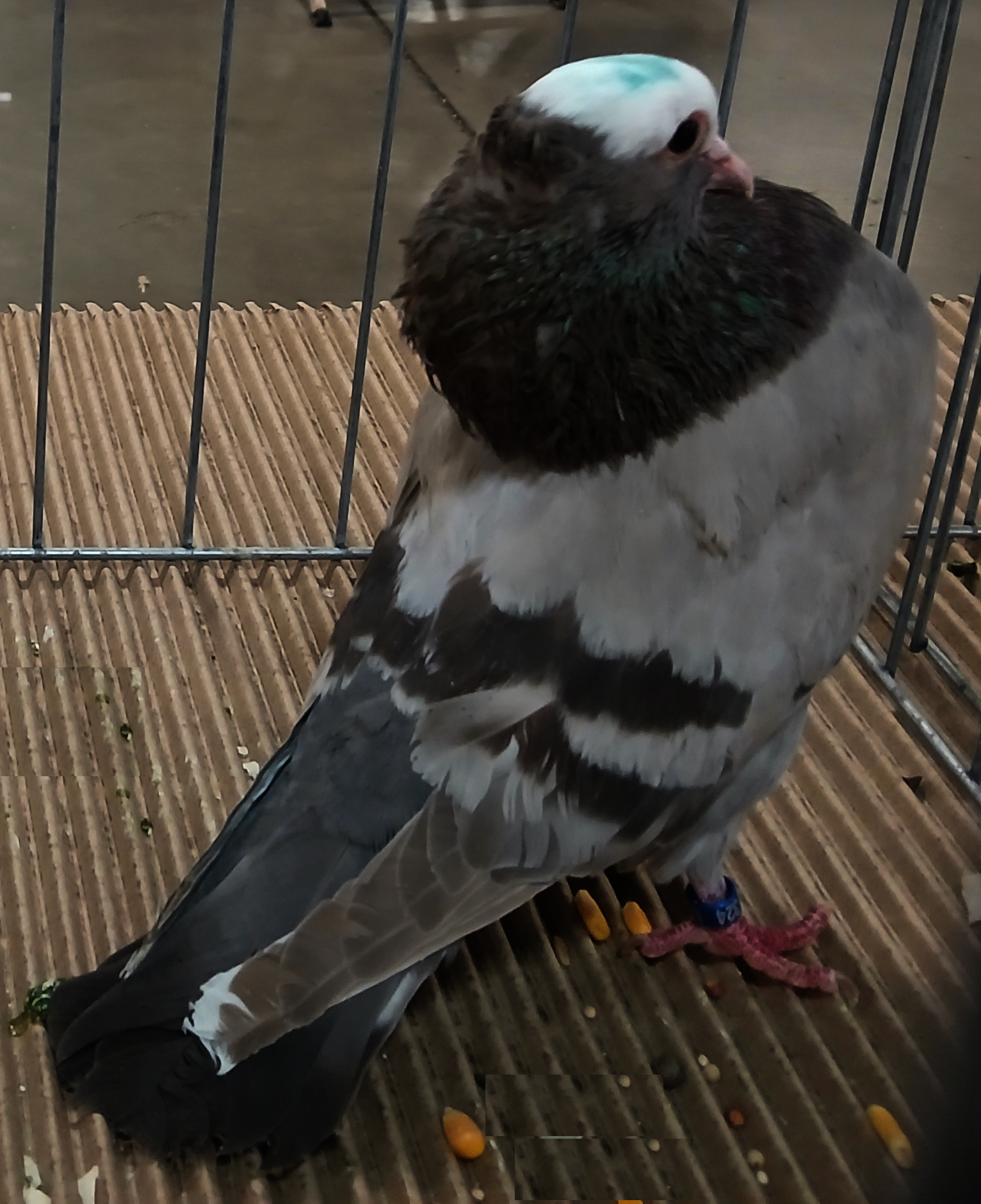

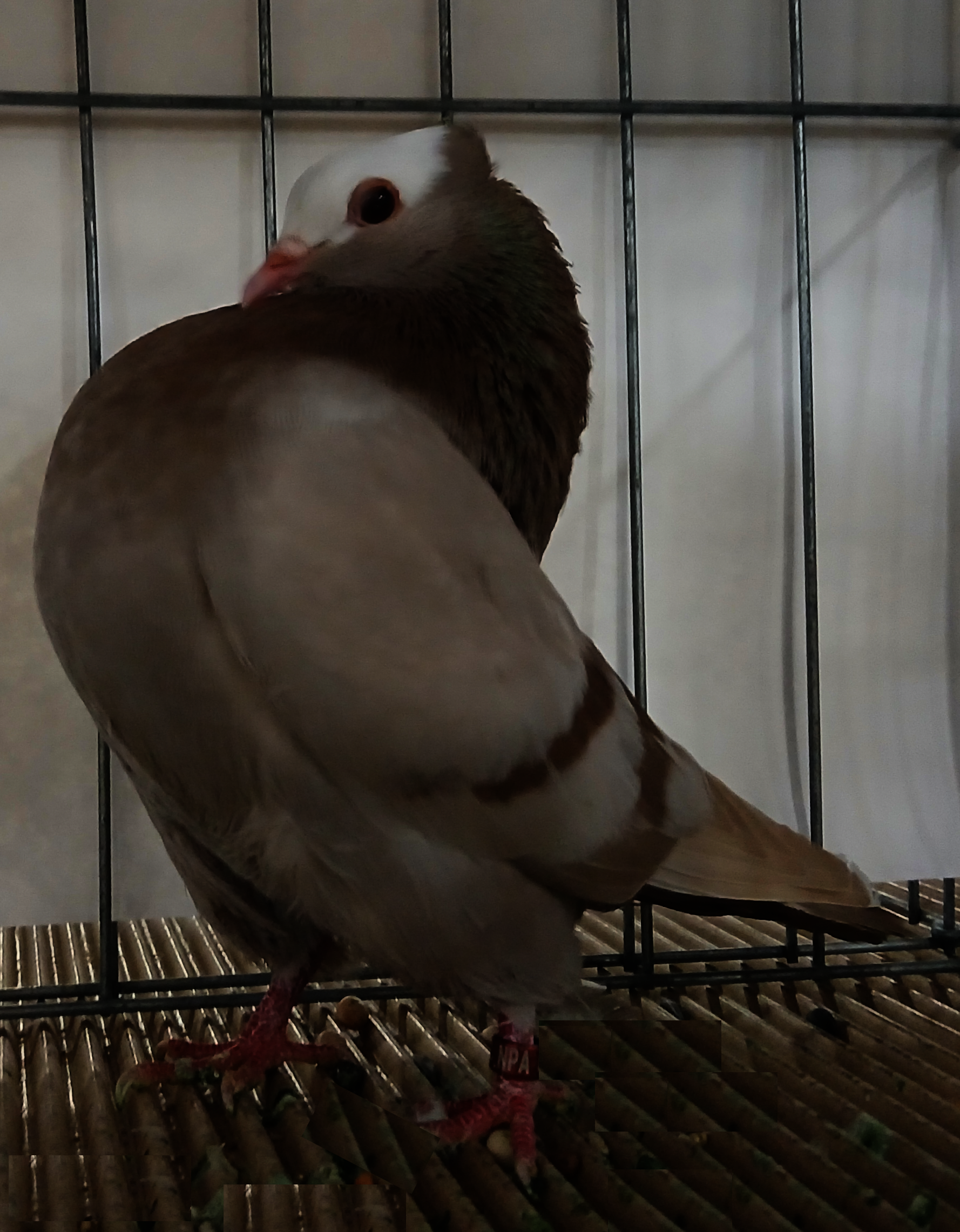

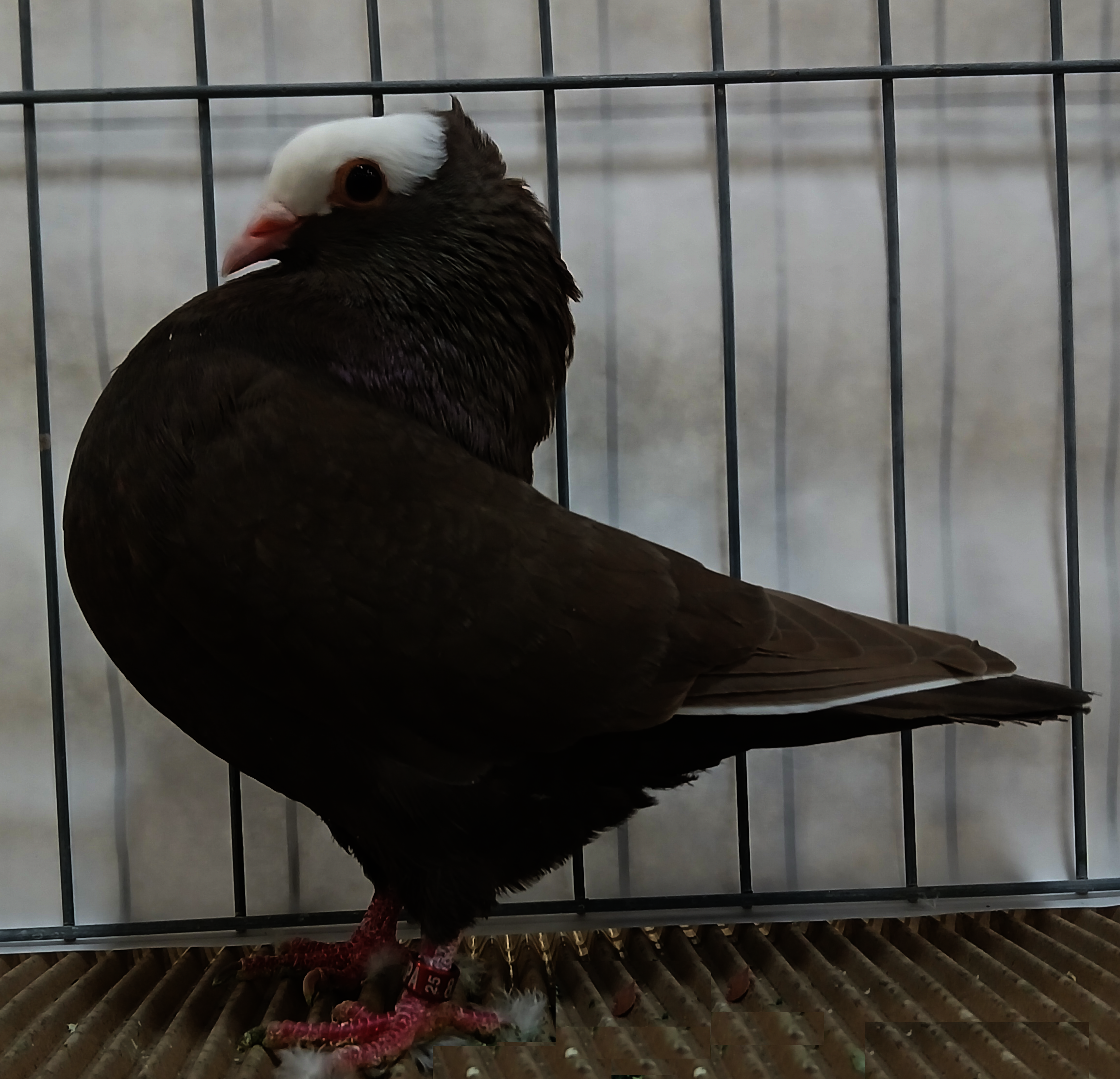

== See also ==
- American Mookee Association - Rare Colours
- Pigeon Diet
- Pigeon Housing
- List of Pigeon Breeds
- EE List of Fancy Pigeon Breeds
- US List of Fancy Pigeon Breeds
