= German Nun pigeon =

Breed of pigeon

German Nun
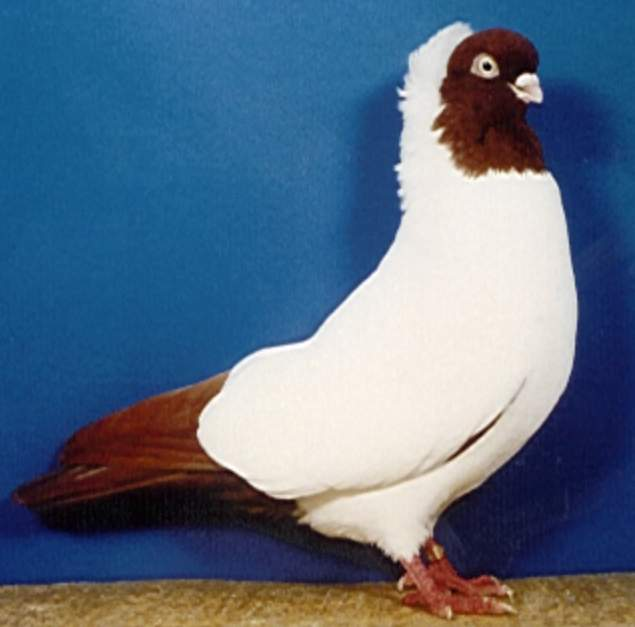
- Red German Nun
- Conservation status: Common
- Country of origin: Germany

Classification
- US Breed Group: Fancy
- EE Breed Group: Tumbler

Notes
- One of two major breeds of Nun pigeons.

German Nun (German: Deutsches Nönnchen) is a breed of fancy pigeon bred by German pigeon fanciers. German pigeon-breeders have had great success in breeding German Nuns, which originated in the early seventeenth century. These birds are also widespread among the pigeon-breeders of Russia, where they are called Cross Monks. The breed got its name Monk from a colored cap on its head, and Cross from the colored tail and colored primary wing feathers, which resemble a cross during the pigeon's flight. The rest of the feathering is white.

== General Description ==
Pigeons of this breed have a perfect body posture, a lordly air and a high carriage. The breed is substantial and viable. The birds have a specific feathering pattern, where the colored feathering can be black, red, yellow, coffee-brown, ash-grey, light blue or silver; the coloring must be deep and even. Birds are of medium size, have a round, narrow dry elongated high forehead. They have eyes of medium size, which are lively and expressive with a white or pearl iris and a dark pupil. The average length of the beak is 15–17 mm. The neck is of medium length (if compared with the thin head), and smoothly descends to the chest and back; on the back side of the neck there is a crest which is a part of the forelock. The back is elongated and recedes towards the tail. The chest is relatively wide. The tail is flat, long, narrow and consists of 12 feathers. This breed has light-red unfledged legs of medium length. A characteristic feature of this breed is a high, tight, conchiform forelock, which reaches to the crest on the back, and curls on the end of the forelock which descend to the ears.

These birds are medium-billed tumblers.

== Flight ==
The distinctive flight pattern of German Nuns is a low, circular soar, which usually doesn't last long. Among Nuns there are "racers": if these see an alien pigeon when sitting on the roof, they immediately take off and by clapping their wings start to "invite" that pigeon to their pigeon-loft.

== See also ==
- List of pigeon breeds
