= Wildlife of Punjab, India =

Ecosystem of Indian state

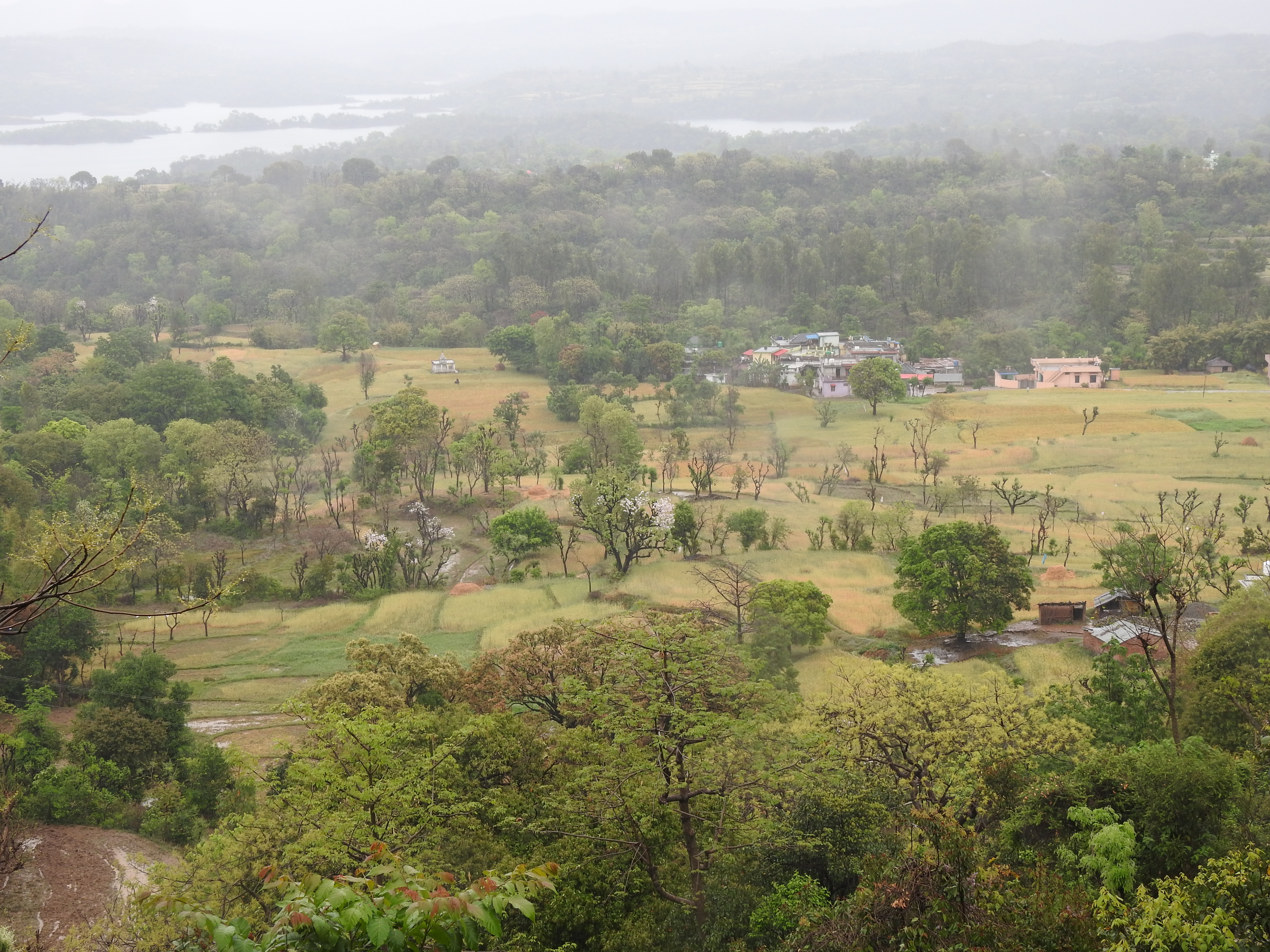
View of the natural landscape near Dunera, Pathankot district

The wildlife of Punjab, India is rich, with 396 types of birds, 214 kinds of Lepidoptera, 55 varieties of fish, 20 types of reptiles, and 19 kinds of mammals. The state of Punjab has large wetland areas, bird sanctuaries that house numerous species of birds, and many zoological parks. Wetlands include the national wetland Hari-Ke-Pattan, the wetland of Kanjli, and the wetlands of Kapurthala Sutlej. Wildlife sanctuaries include the Harike in the district of Tarn Taran Sahib, the Zoological Park in Rupnagar, Chhatbir Bansar Garden in Sangrur, Aam Khas Bagh in Sirhind, Amritsar's famous Ram Bagh Palace, Shalimar Garden in Kapurthala, and the famous Baradari Garden in the city of Patiala. There are a total of 5,167 floral, fungal, and faunal species in the state of Punjab.

Parts of the districts of Gurdaspur, Hoshiarpur, Pathankot, Nawanshahr, and Ropar contain sub-mountainous zones and undulating land below the Shivalik hills region.

== Protected areas ==
Protected areas
Type	Number
Wildlife sanctuaries	13
Ramsar sites	6
Botanical gardens	5
Zoological parks	1
Deer parks	4
Community reserves	3

== Flora and fungi ==
In the Punjabi-language, the word bir refers to reserved forest or village land set aside as common pasture. Punjab used to have large forests and jungles, such as the Lakhi, Kahnuwan, and Macchiwara jungles, that were used by Sikhs during historical periods of open-genocide and active-oppression against them, such as under the Mughals. However, much of its former forests were subsequently cut-down. Although, some forest cover remains, such as at the site of sacred groves, which are associated with local religious and cultural beliefs. Sacred groves are referred to as jhidi in Punjabi and they harbour rare animal and plant species not found elsewhere in the state. There are at-least nine major sacred groves in Punjab, India. Aside from sacred groves, some remaining forest fragments can be found near Sikh gurdwaras and deras, such as Gurdwara Tibbi Sahib (Muktsar), Gurdwara Sattal Khara (Muktsar), and Dera Baba Dhyan Das (Mansa).

Punjab has the lowest forest cover as a percentage of land area of any Indian state, with 3.6% of its total area under forest cover as of 2017. A 2019 study found that 6.83% of the state's total geographic area was either under forest (3.67%) or tree cover (3.16%). In-contrast, over 83% of the area of the state was agricultural.

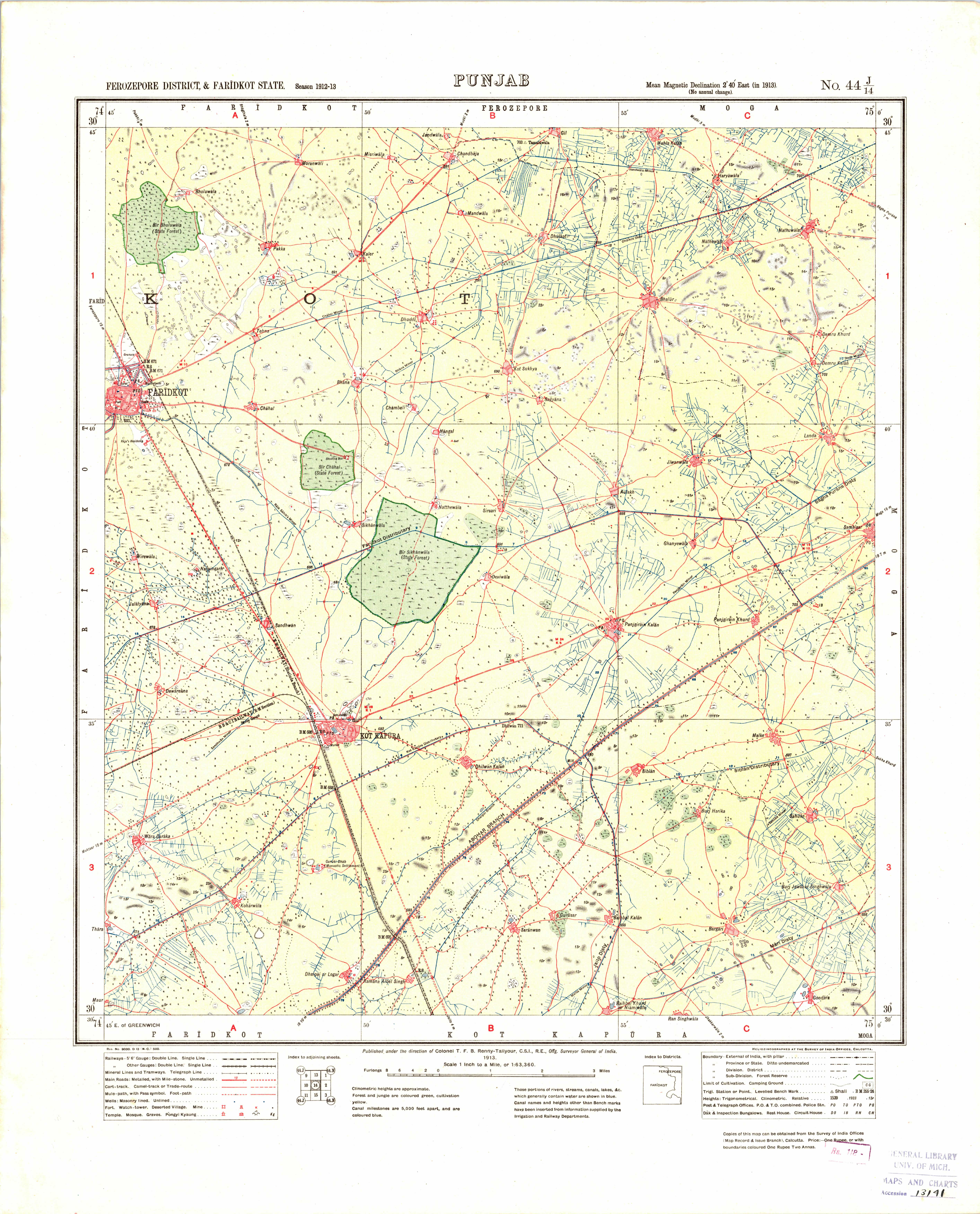
Survey of India geographical block-map for 45 J14 Ferozepore District (1913). Protected forest areas (bir) can be seen.

Under Pahar Singh of Faridkot State, the jungles that surrounded Faridkot were deforested to clear the land for development. During the Green Revolution, large tracts of jungles were cut-down in the state to make room for agriculture and forested areas were also cleared for road infrastructure and residential homes. Various NGOs are working towards afforestation and reforestation of the state by launching educational drives, planting saplings, working towards regulatory changes, and pressuring organisations to follow environmental laws. One NGO, EcoSikh, has planted over 100 forests, composed of native plant species, in the state using the Japanese Miyawaki methodology that are named 'Guru Nanak Sacred Forests'. Native plant species are facing the risk of extirpation from the state but planting mini-forests throughout the land can help prevent this from occurring. Prior to the Green Revolution, Butea monosperma (known as 'dhak' in Punjabi) trees were found in abundance in the state. RoundGlass began the localization of the Billion Tree Project in Punjab, aiming to restore indigenous plant species, such as at Baradari Bagh at Moti Bagh Palace in Patiala with a nursery at Lang village in Patiala district but other nurseries are located in Bathinda, Firozpur, Faridkot, Amritsar, and Hoshiarpur districts. The organization operates a Tree Directory that documents the location of every tree older than 50 years and has documented 319 settlements in Punjab named after trees.

Taxonomic diversity of floral and fungi species in Punjab, India
Taxonomic grouping	Number of species
Algae	371
Fungi	560
Lichens	21
Bryophytes	29
Pteridophytes	30
Gymnosperms	21
Angiosperms	1,939
Total	2,971

== Fauna ==
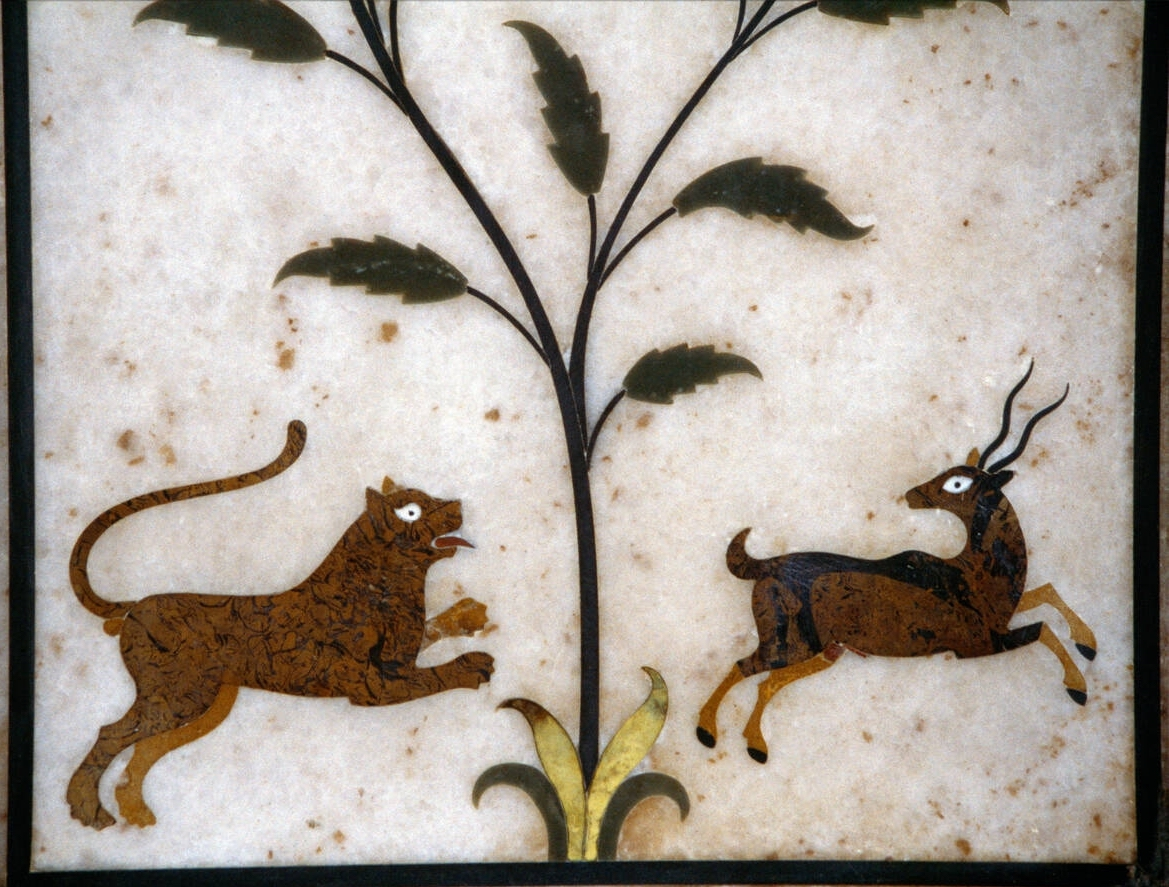
Inlaid stone art (jaratkari) from the walls of the Golden Temple shrine in Amritsar depicting a predatory cat hunting a blackbuck antelope

A few of the rivers in Punjab have crocodiles, including reintroduced gharials in the Beas River after half a century of their extirpation from the state. Indus river dolphins can be found in the Harike Wetland. The extraction of silk from silkworms is another industry that flourishes in the state. Production of bee honey is done in some parts of Punjab. The southern plains are desert land; hence, camels can be seen. Buffaloes graze around the banks of rivers. The northeastern part is home to animals like horses. Wildlife sanctuaries have many more species of wild animals like the otter, wild boar, wildcat, fruit bat, hog deer, flying fox, squirrel, and mongoose. Naturally formed forests can be seen in the Shivalik ranges in the districts of Ropar, Gurdaspur and Hoshiarpur. Patiala is home to the Bir forest while the wetlands area in Punjab is home to the Mand forest. The local subspecies of blackbuck, A. c. rajputanae, is facing the risk of extirpation from the state.Wildlife crime, including illegal hunting and wildlife trade, has also been identified as an emerging conservation concern in parts of Punjab. Botanical gardens exist throughout Punjab. There is a zoological park and a tiger safari park, as well as three parks dedicated to deer.

The state bird is the northern goshawk (baz) (Accipiter gentilis), the state animal is the blackbuck (Antilope cervicapra), the state aquatic animal is Indus river dolphin (Platanista minor), and the state tree is the shisham (Dalbergia sissoo).

Taxonomic diversity of faunal species in Punjab, India
Taxonomic grouping	Number of species
Platyhelminthes	41
Phylum Protozoa	84
Nematoda	157
Annelida	34
Arthropoda	1,147
Mollusca	85
Pisces	113
Amphibia	15
Replia	35
Aves	442
Mammalia	43
Total	2,196

== Threatened and endangered species ==
There are a total of thirteen species (8 floral and 5 faunal) facing extinction in the state of Punjab.

Threatened and endangered species
Floral
No.		Name
1.		Tecomella undulata
2.		Withania coagulans
3.		Anogeissus sericea
4.		Alysicarpus bupleuurifolius
5.		Hibiscus hoshiarpurensis
6.		Ceropegia bulbosa
7.		Ophioglossum gramineum
8.		Ophioglossum polyphyllum
Faunal
No.	Common name	Scientific name
1.	Indus river dolphin	Platanista minor / Plantista gangetica
2.	White-rumped vulture	Gyps bengalensis
3.	Sarus crane	Grus antigone
4.	Indian python	Python molurus
5.	Indian roofed turtle	Pangshura tecta

== List of natural areas in Punjab, India ==
=== Wetlands ===
- Harike Lake
- Ropar Lake
- Kanjli Lake
- Nangal Wildlife Sanctuary

=== Nature reserves and sanctuaries ===
- Abohar Wildlife Sanctuary
- Bir Aishvan Wildlife Sanctuary
- Bir Bunerheri Wildlife Sanctuary

=== Community and conservation reserves ===
- Keshopur-Miani Community Reserve (Keshopur-Chhamb Community Reserve)
- Lalwan Community Reserve
- Panniwala-Gumjal-Haripura-Diwankhera Community Reserve
- Siswan Community Reserve
- Rakh Sarai Amanat Khan Conservation Reserve
- Bir Bhadson Wildlife Sanctuary
- Roapar Wetland Conservation Reserve
- Ranjit Sagar Dam Conservation Reserve
- Beas Conservation Reserve

=== Forests ===
- Mattewara
- Machhiwara
- Lakhi

=== Sacred groves ===
- Bir Sikhanwala
- Tapoban Dhakki Sahib
- Charpat Bani
- Tilla Puran Bhagat
- Dera Baba Mallo Ram Ji
- Sant Sar
- Dargah Baba Ji
- Kaya Kalp Vriksh
- Bhairon Jatti

== State symbols ==
- State tree: Dalbergia sissoo (Tahli/Shisham)
- State animal: Antelope cervicapra L. (Kala Hiran/Black Buck)
- State bird: Accipiter gentilis (Baaz/Northern goshawk)
- State aquatic animal: Platanista gangetica minor (Indus River Dolphin)

== See also ==
- Department of Forest and Wildlife (Punjab)
- Wildlife of Lahore District
- Forestry, Wildlife and Fisheries department, Punjab
- Sikhism and the environment
