= Sikhism and the environment =

The relationship between Sikhs and the environment can be traced back to the period of the Sikh gurus, especially Guru Har Rai. In recent times, Sikh groups have been at the forefront of environmental movements and causes, such as EcoSikh. Environmentalist themes and ideas can be found within the primary Sikh canon, the Guru Granth Sahib. Guru Nanak had an affinity for nature and Sikh sites reflect this, such as at the Golden Temple where fish and trees can be found.

== History ==
=== Origins ===
Antecedents of Sikh forays into environmentalism can be found within the Guru Granth Sahib itself. The second shloka of the Japji Sahib of Guru Nanak stresses on the importance of living in-harmony with nature. Furthermore, Guru Har Rai taught that the environment should be cared for by Sikhs. The sarbat da bhala philosophy of Sikhs calls upon them to promote the well-being of all.

=== Sikh Empire ===
Maharaja Ranjit Singh was very fond of trees and greenery, and therefore imposed a ban on the felling of any trees within 24 miles around Lahore.

=== Environmental causes ===
Photograph of the entrance to the Bhai Piara Singh Ward of the All India Pingalwara Charitable Society, Amritsar, Punjab, India, 8 April 2023

Some earlier Sikh organizations that delved into environmental efforts include Pingalwara, established by Bhagat Puran Singh, whom had pro-environmental inclinations. Balbir Singh Seechewal of the Nirmala sect, spearheaded the movement to clean-up the Kali Bein rivulet in the year 2000. The Kali Bein, which has a high-degree of importance in the Sikh religion as the location where Guru Nanak became religiously transformed in God's court, had been degraded due to agricultural run-off, untreated sewage, and an overgrowth of water hyacinth that was clogging-up the rivulet. Seechewal also had raised awareness on the Buddha Nullah issue.

Sewa Singh, director of the Nishan-e-Sikhi Charitable Trust based in Khadur Sahib, supervised the distribution and planting of hundreds of thousands of tree saplings. The roadways of Khadur Sahib being lined with these planted trees, though not all of them are indigenous species. Furthermore, gardens were planted that contain a larger variety of tree species.

The Machhiwara jungle that existed during Guru Gobind Singh's time, which was cut-down in the subsequent centuries, is planned to be revived by the SGPC through the planting of samplings on gurdwara land the organization owns within the locality to revive the lost forest.

Activism from mainly Sikh groups were instrumental in saving the Mattewara forest area from being cut-down.

== Theological perspectives ==
Sikhs believe that the environment and the various forces of nature are sentient, forming part of the divine consciousness of existence. In the Guru Granth Sahib on page 6, the wind, water, fire, planets, galaxies, and solar systems are described as being part of the divine oneness that interlinks all. Sikhs believe animals are sentient beings who worship the divine. Due to the Sikh respect for animals, many Sikhs follow a vegetarian diet, however a vegetarian diet is not mandated in Sikhism. The only restrictions relating to meat are related to Sikhs being barred from consuming meat sourced from an animal that was slaughtered through a religiously sacrificial manner, such as halal. Furthermore, Sikhs are expected to refrain from eating meat if it is injurious to their health. Another reason why meat-consumption is not officially banned in Sikhism is due to how the Guru Granth Sahib on page 1189 describes how vegetables are also living creatures, so it would be discriminatory to ban eating meat but not ban eating plants.

== See also ==
- Wildlife of Punjab, India
- Wildlife of Lahore District
- Bir Bunerheri Wildlife Sanctuary
