= Kathlaur Kushlian Wildlife Sanctuary =

Wildlife sanctuary in Pathankot district, Punjab, India

- Kathlour–Kushlian Wildlife Sanctuary
- IUCN category IV (habitat/species management area)
- Location within Punjab Location within India
- Interactive map of Kathlaur Kushlian Wildlife Sanctuary
- Location: Pathankot district, Punjab, India
- Nearest city: Pathankot
- Coordinates: 32.275797°N 75.440341°E
- Area: 758.40 ha (1,874.0 acres)
- Established: 2007
- Governing body: Department of Forest and Wildlife (Punjab)

Kathlaur Kushlian Wildlife Sanctuary is a wildlife sanctuary in Pathankot district in the Indian state of Punjab.

== History and designation ==
The area was notified as a wildlife sanctuary by the Government of Punjab in 2007 (Punjab Government Notification No. 34/13/2007/Ft-V/6133 dated 28 June 2007). The notified protected area covers approximately 758.40 hectares (about 1,896 acres) of government forest land and includes lands in and around the villages of Kushalian and Kathlour and adjoining villages.

== Geography and habitat ==
The sanctuary lies near Pathankot (about 25 km from the city) and is situated on the floodplain of the River Ravi. Habitats in the sanctuary include closed-canopy forest, grassland patches (Saccharum and native grasses) and water bodies that support mammals and a variety of birds.

== Flora and fauna ==
The sanctuary is reported to support several ungulates including chital (spotted deer), sambar, hog deer and barking deer. Other fauna reported from the area include porcupine, pangolin and python; avifauna reported includes parakeets, spotted owlet and vultures.

== Conservation and threats ==
The sanctuary is managed by the Department of Forest and Wildlife (Punjab), Government of Punjab. The official Gazette / MoEF notification also defines an Eco-sensitive Zone (100 m around the sanctuary boundary) and lists the zonal restrictions and coordinates in Annexure II/III of the PDF. In June 2024 a large fire affected parts of the sanctuary area and the Punjab wildlife/forest authorities carried out an assessment of the damage.

== Tourism and visitor facilities ==
The sanctuary was developed for controlled eco-tourism and was opened to visitors in September 2021 after development works costing around ₹1.2 crore were completed. District material lists visitor facilities such as a 5-km nature trail, observation towers and battery/golf-cart style low-impact vehicles for visitors to minimise disturbance.

== Location and access ==
The sanctuary lies along the Amritsar–Jammu bypass in Tehsil Pathankot; the nearest transport hub is Pathankot (railway station and airport access to the district).

== See also ==
- Bir Bunerheri Wildlife Sanctuary
