= Fantail pigeon =

Breed of pigeon

Fantail
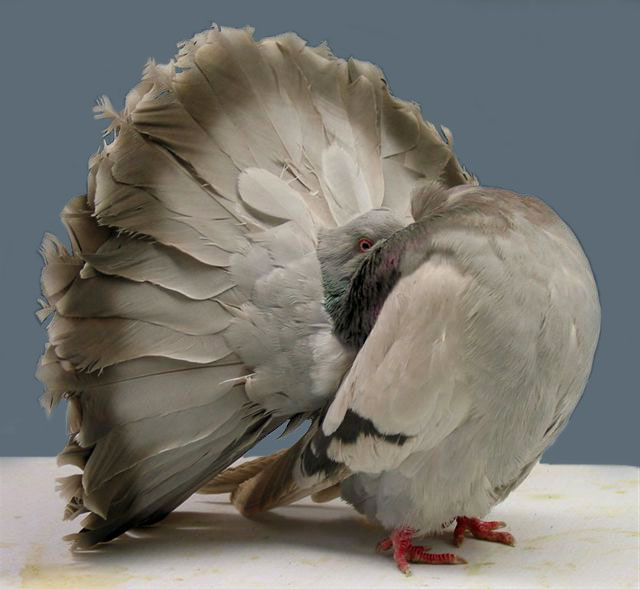
- Conservation status: Common

Traits
- Crest type: none
- Feather ornamentation: fantail

Classification
- Australian Breed Group: Group 1
- US Breed Group: Fancy
- EE Breed Group: Structure pigeons

The Fantail is a popular breed of fancy pigeon. It is characterised by a fan-shaped tail, resembling a peacock, composed of 30 to 40 feathers, abnormally more than most members of the dove and pigeon family, which usually have 12 to 14 tail feathers. The breed is thought to have originated in Pakistan, India, China, Japan or Spain.

There are several subvarieties, such as the English Fantail, the Indian Fantail, which has a peak crest, the Thai Fantail and the Miniature. Charles Darwin used it as one of the examples in the first chapter of his book On the Origin of Species. He believed it was a descendant of the rock dove (Columba livia).

The American Pigeon Journal had special issues devoted to the breed in February 1975 and July 1977, with one available for viewing here.

There is a feather mutation called Silky that gives an interesting lace effect to a Fantail's tail feathers. Fantails with this mutation are known as Silky or Lace Fantails.

Fantails are often used by pigeon flyers in the training of racing pigeons and Tipplers. They are used as droppers in that they are placed on the loft landing board as a signal to the flying birds to come in and be fed.

== Thai Fantail ==
This breed was first introduced by Charles Darwin. They are similar to Indian Fantails, but are pure white and have ribbon-like stripes on their tails. It is difficult to breed outside of Thailand, and few people have done so. A breeder in Pakistan successfully produced striped Thai Fantails by pairing black colored males and brown colored females of different breeds.

== Gallery ==
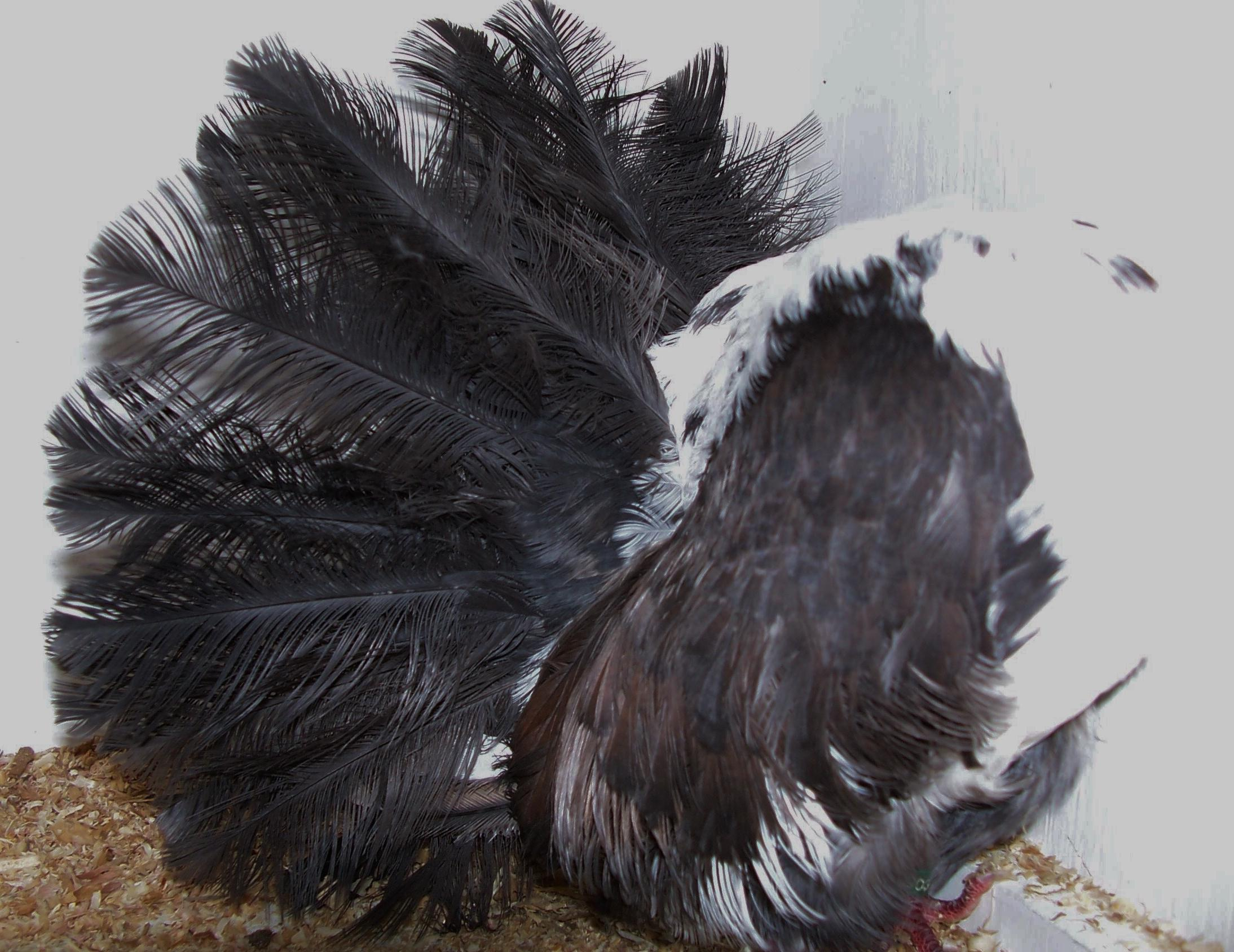
Silky Fantail

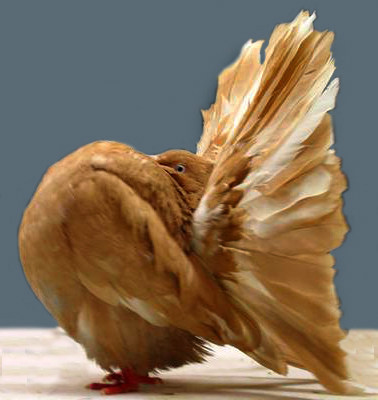
Fantail Yellow

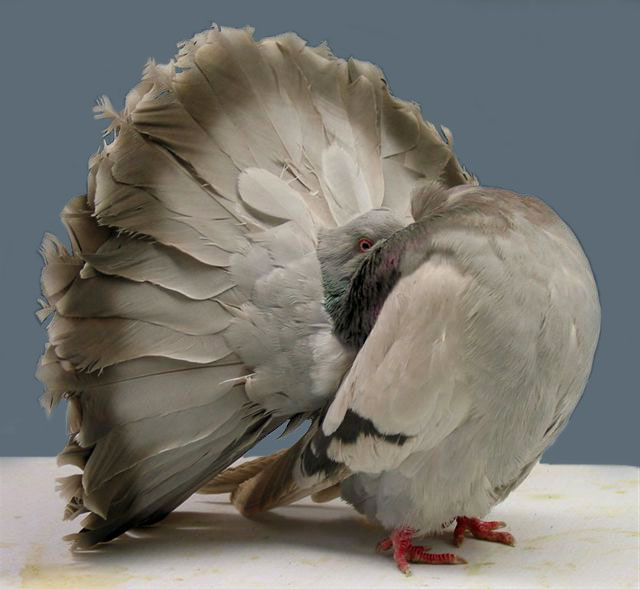
Fantail Siver

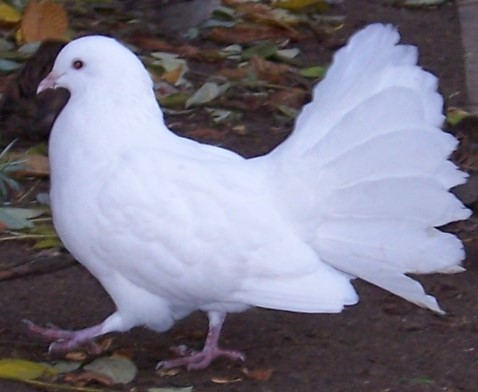
Campogrande Valladolid paloma

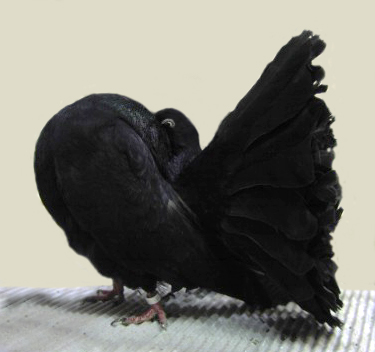
Fantail Black

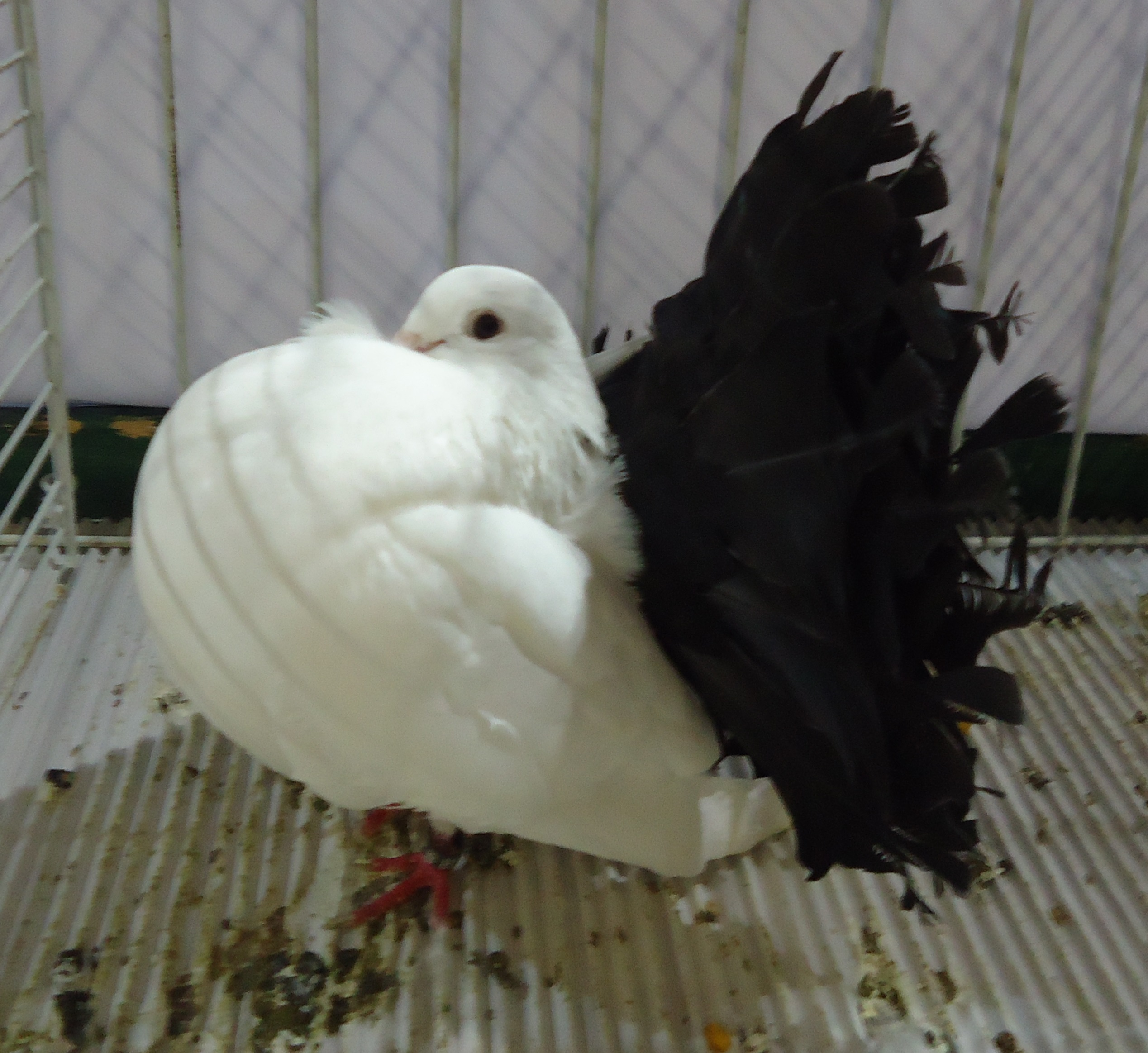
Pigeon paon blanc à queue noir

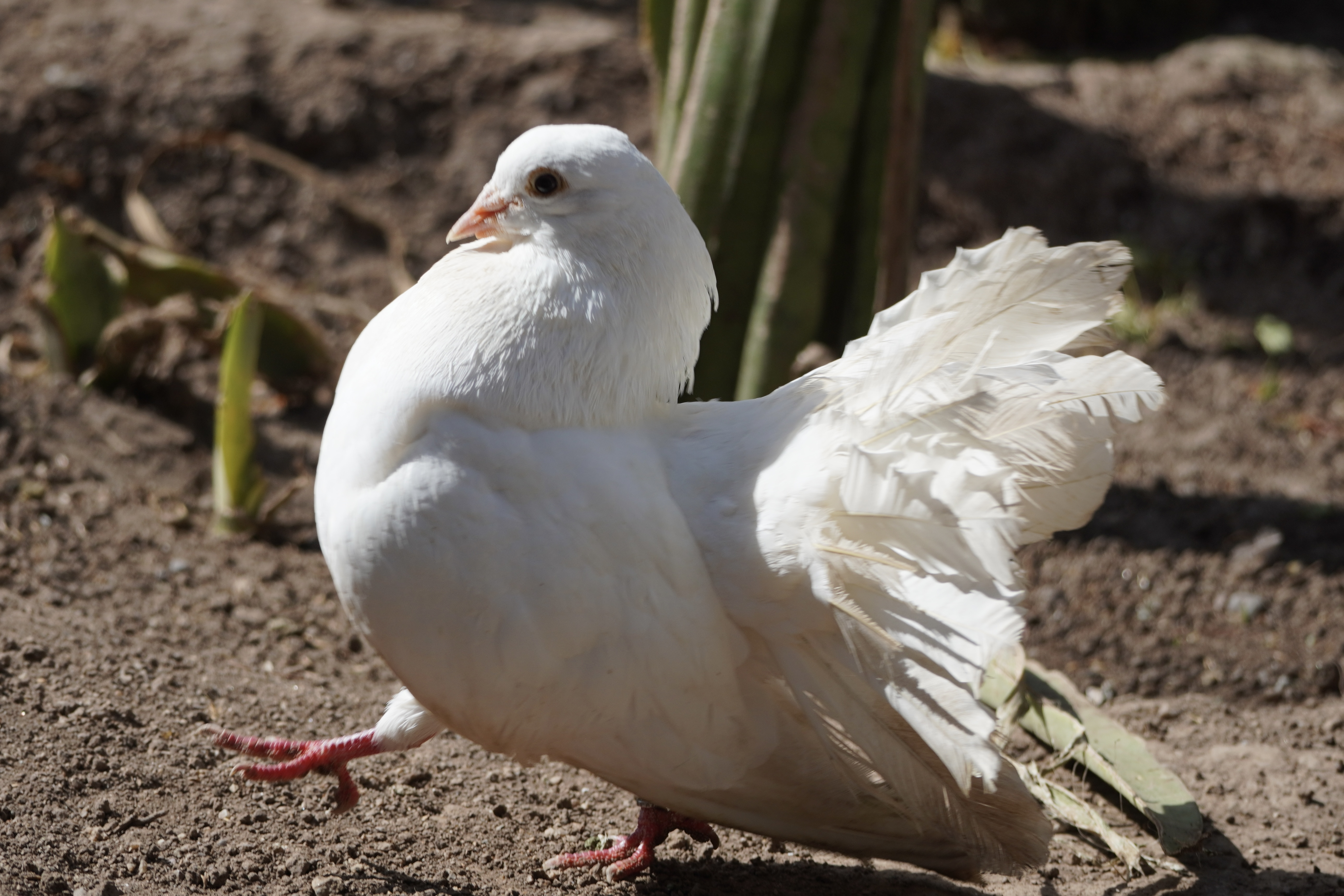
English Fantail

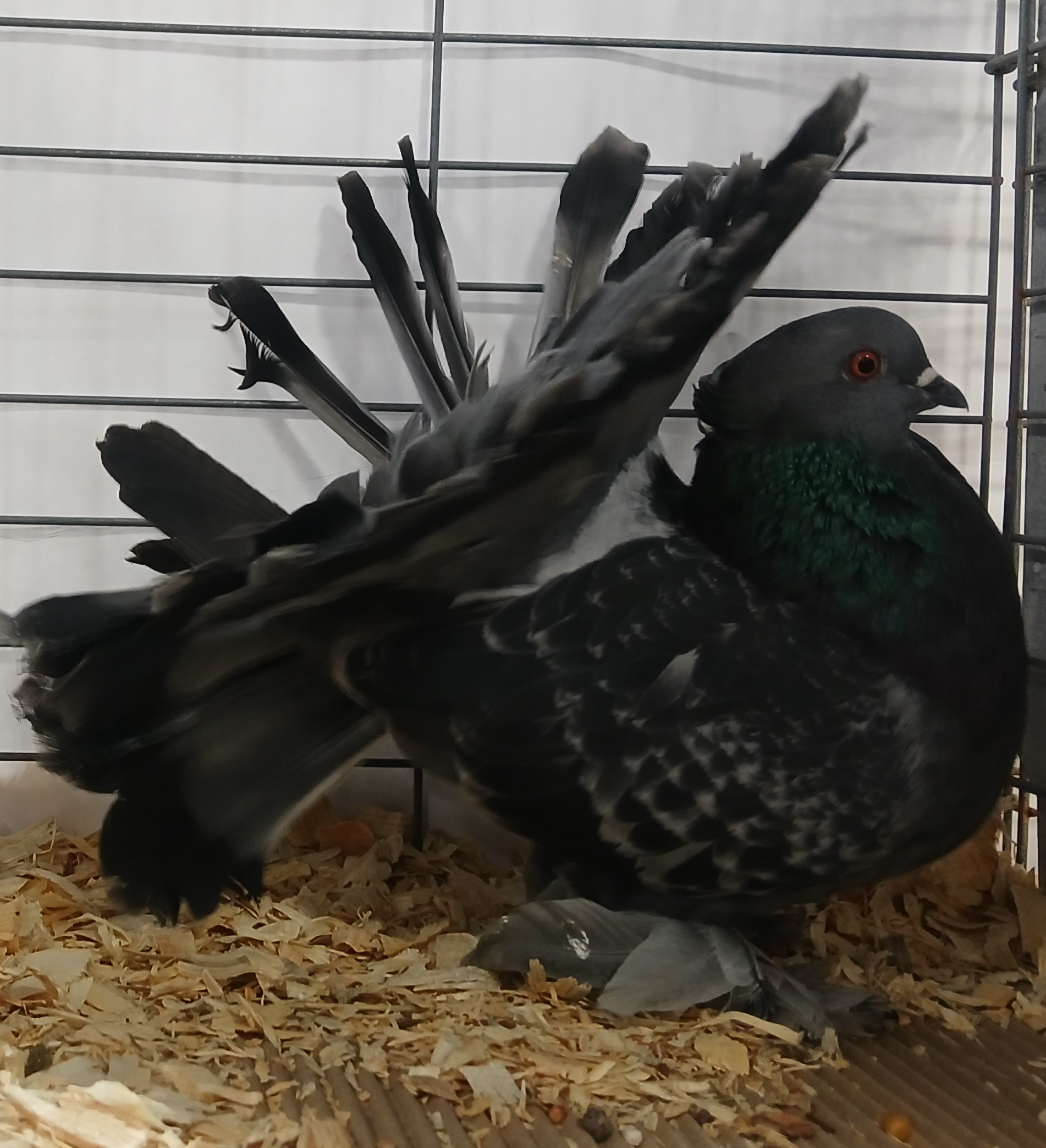
Miniature blue check

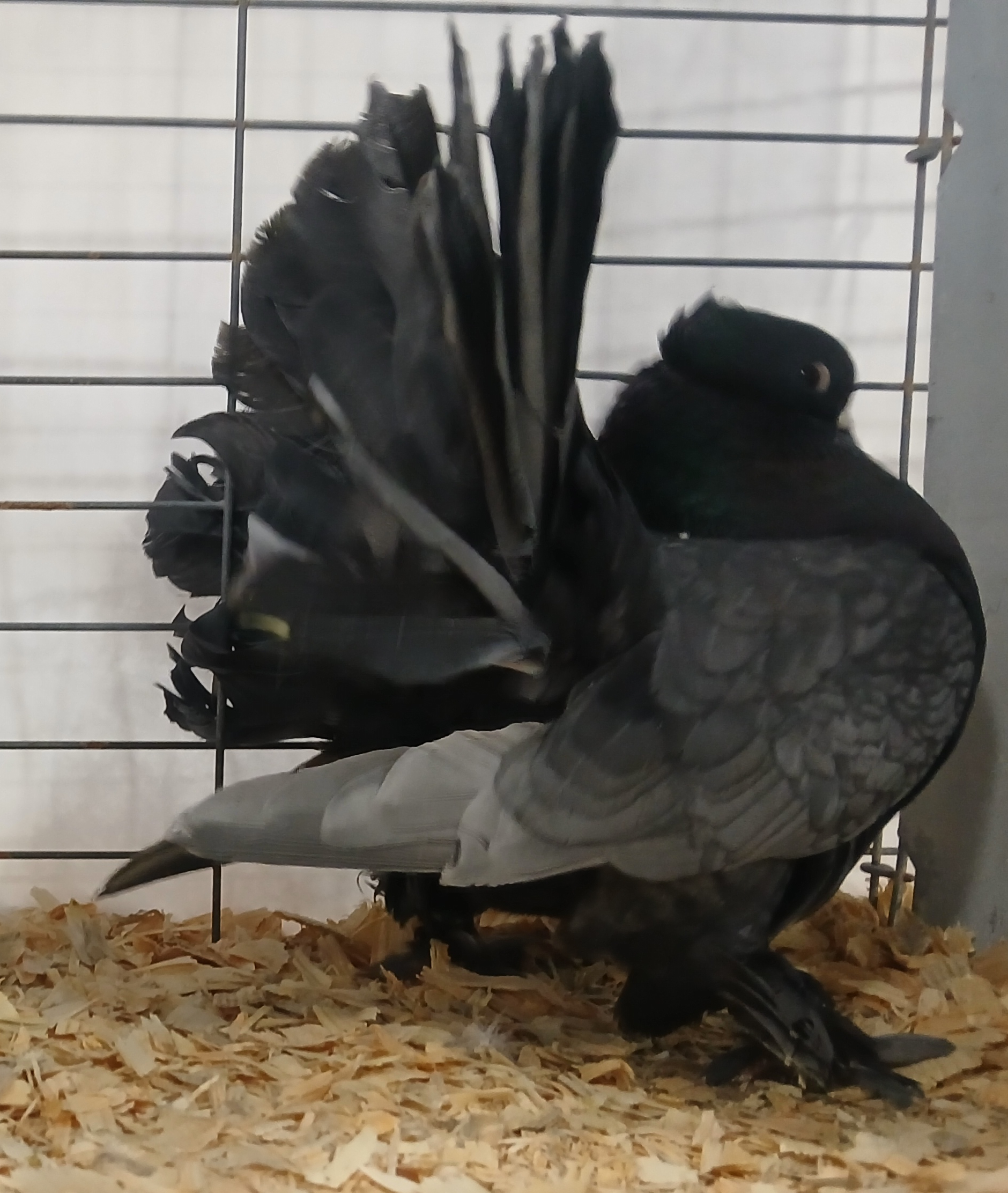
Miniature black

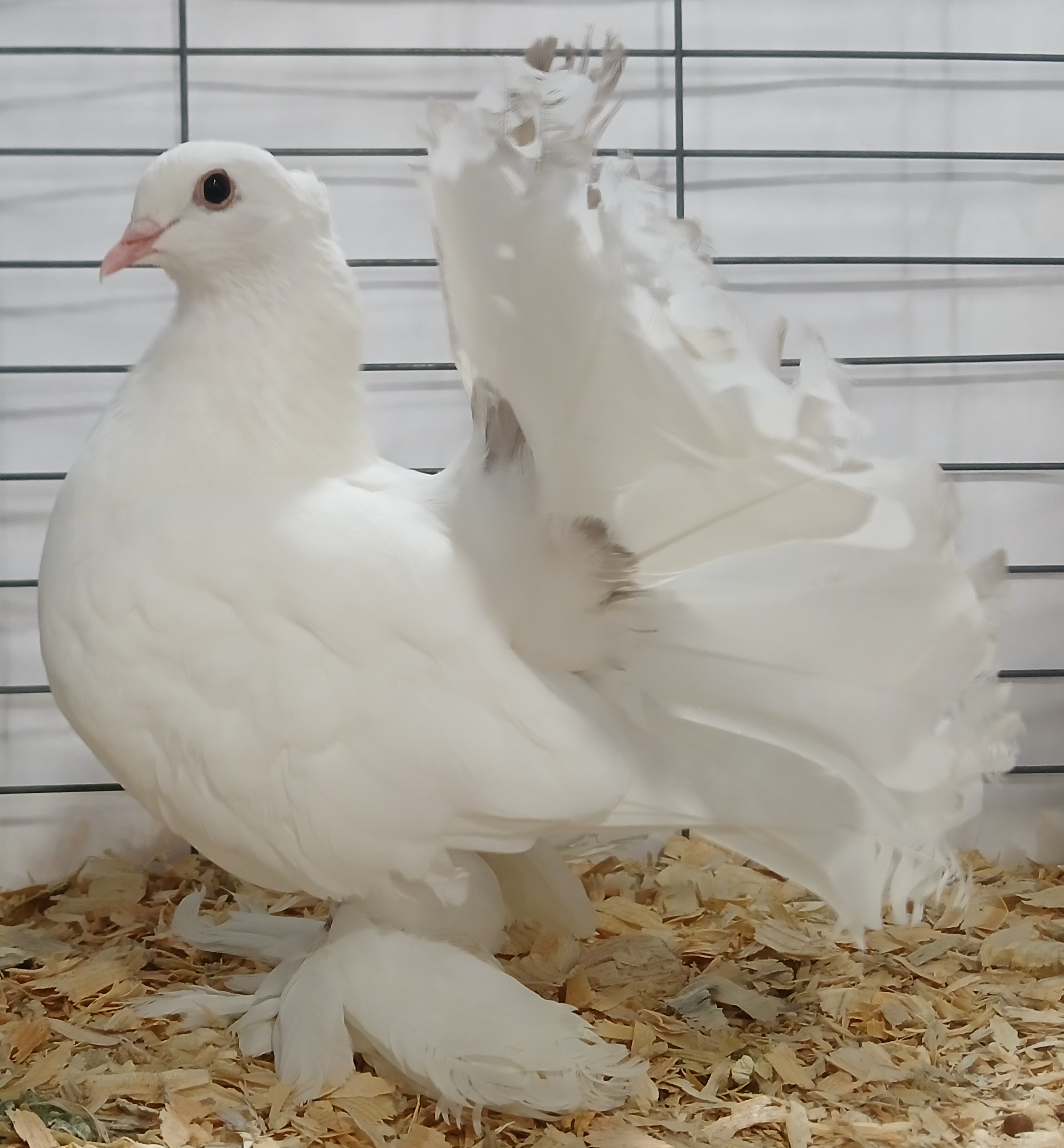
Miniature white

== See also ==
- List of pigeon breeds
- Pigeon keeping
  - Pigeon Diet
  - Pigeon Housing
- American Pigeon Journal December 68 fantail Special
- De Struucture Duiven
- Media related to Fantail pigeons at Wikimedia Commons
