= English Fantail =

Breed of pigeon

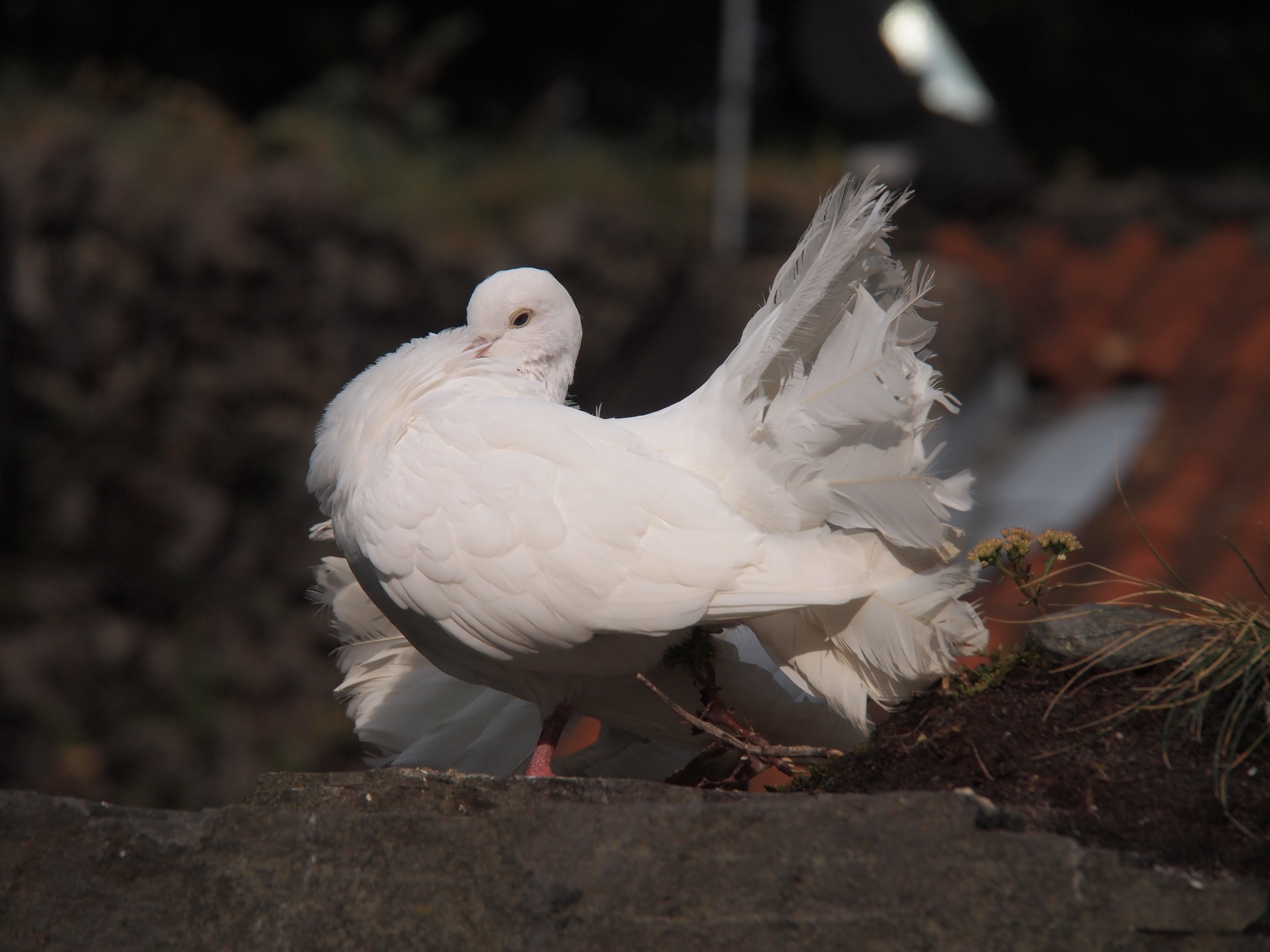
- English Fantail
- Conservation status: Common
- Other names: Fantail
- Country of origin: India

Traits
- Feather ornamentation: Fan shaped tail with 30 to 40 feathers

Classification
- Australian Breed Group: Asian feather and voice pigeons
- US Breed Group: Fancy pigeons
- EE Breed Group: Structure pigeons

Notes
- A popular exhibition breed.

The English Fantail is a highly developed breed of fancy pigeon. The Fantail, along with other varieties of domesticated pigeons, are all descendants of the rock dove (Columba livia). The Fantail is said to have originated in India, but there are early references to it in Spain and China.

== See also ==
- Fantail (pigeon)
- List of pigeon breeds
