= Abohar Wildlife Sanctuary =

Wildlife sanctuary in Punjab, India

Coordinates: 30°01′30″N 74°20′40″E

- Black Buck Sanctuary
- IUCN category IV (habitat/species management area)
- Interactive map of Abohar Wildlife Sanctuary
- Location: Fazilka district, Punjab, India
- Nearest city: Abohar
- Area: 186.5 km^{2} (72.0 sq mi)
- Established: 1975
- Governing body: Department of Forest and Wildlife (Punjab)
- Website: fazilka.nic.in/tourist-place/black-buck-sanctuary-abohar/

Abohar Wildlife Sanctuary earned the status of a sanctuary in 1975 and again in 2000 under the Wildlife Protection Act 1972. It is located in the Fazilka district of Punjab and is a private nature reserve. It is known for being a preservation hotspot for blackbuck, which is regarded as a sacred animal by the people of Bishnoi community who are native to the place.

== Conservation ==
The blackbuck deer are at risk of extirpation from the sanctuary due to predation by feral dogs, habitat destruction, and the installation of "cobra wiring" (bladed-edged iron wire mesh) by local farmers. It has been proposed to resettle some of the deer to another site named Sohian Bir. The population of blackbucks in the sanctuary decreased from 3,500 in 2011 to 3,273 in 2017.

== Location ==
The Abohar Wildlife Sanctuary is located in the Fazilka district of Punjab, India. It consists of 13 revenue villages which are inhabited by the people of Bishnoi community. It covers over 18,650 hectares of land. It also consists of 13 farmlands of the Bishnoi people who work towards protecting the blackbuck.

== Major attractions ==
Abohar Wildlife Sanctuary is a major tourist spot. It is home to different varieties of flora and fauna. It is most famous for blackbuck deer and Blue bull. Other species of animals and plants like hare, jackal, wild boar, albizia lebbeck, acacia nilotica, azadirachta indica, a. Tortilis, etc., are found here.

== See also ==
- Bir Aishvan Wildlife Sanctuary
