= Wildlife of Lahore =

Flora and fauna of Lahore

The wildlife of the Lahore in Punjab, Pakistan includes a diverse range of natural and cultivated flora and fauna. The introduced flora of the city of Lahore comes from its cultural heritage as the regional capital of various Indian kingdoms from the 11th century to the early 20th century. Much of the Indian flora was introduced during the reign of Akbar, the third Mughal emperor.

== History ==
The wildlife of Lahore has undergone significant changes over the past two centuries, reflecting shifts in land use and urban growth. During the Mughal and early British periods, the region supported diverse fauna, including jackals, peafowl, nilgai, and blackbuck, thriving in forested and wetland habitats. As Lahore expanded into a major urban center, agricultural development and deforestation drastically reduced wildlife populations. By the mid-20th century, many large mammals had vanished, leaving smaller species to adapt to fragmented green spaces. Today, conservation efforts focus on restoring biodiversity in protected parks and riverine zones, balancing human activity with ecological preservation.

== Flora ==
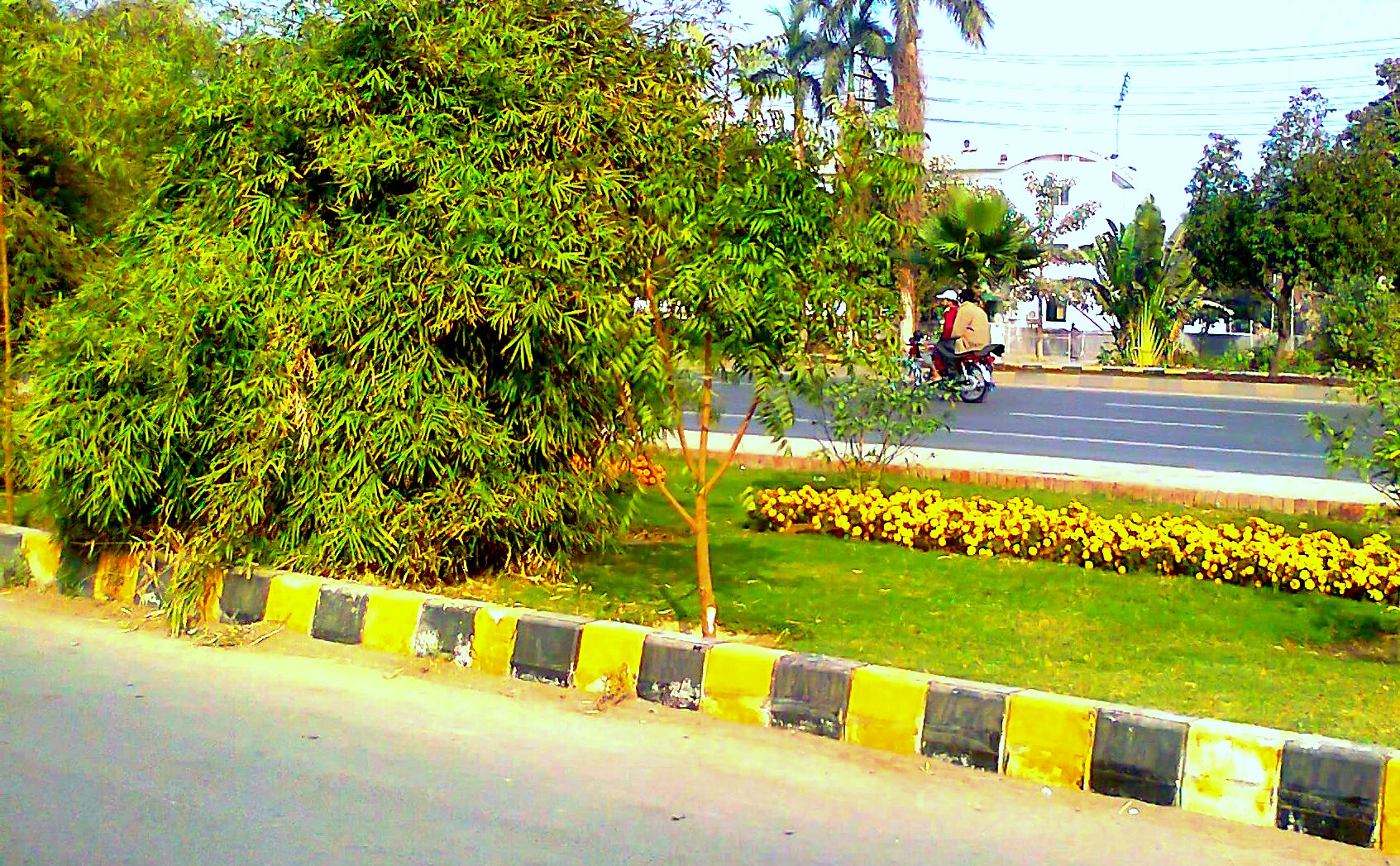
Most of the green belts of Lahore are decorated by extensive flora.

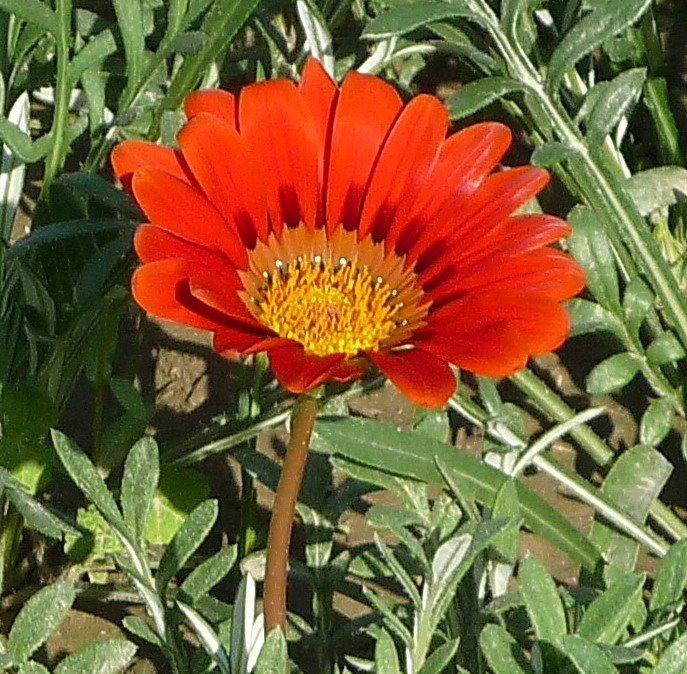
A flower in the Racecourse Park

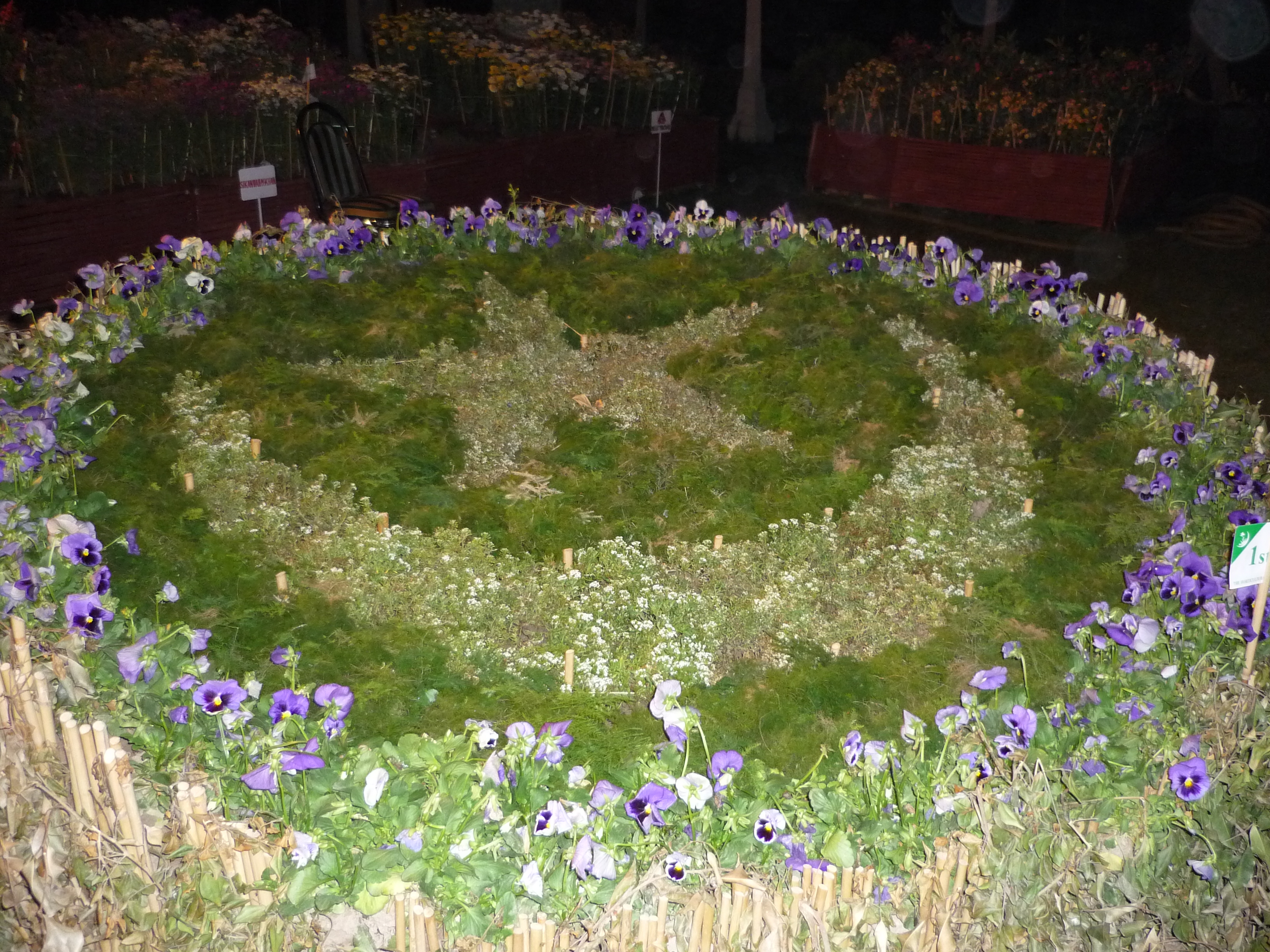
Flower decor in an exhibition in Lahore

Common trees of Lahore include:

- Alstonia scholaris - locally termed ditabark - native to South Asia
- Bombax ceiba- sunbal or silk cotton tree - native to the Himalayas
- Callistemon citrinus - bottle brush - native to Australia
- Dalbergia sissoo - shisham - native to South Asia
- Delonix regia - gulmohar - native to Madagascar
- Erythrina suberosa - coral or gul nister - native to Burma
- Ficus benghalensis - banyan - native to Bangladesh
- Ficus religiosa - pipal - native to South Asia
- Ficus retusa - bobari - native to Malaysia
- Kigelia africana - gul-e-fanoos or sausage - native to Africa
- Livistona chinensis - bottle palm - native to China
- Mangifera indica - aam - native to South Asia
- Mimusops elengi - molsery - native to South Asia
- Pongamia pinnata - sukh chayn or Indian beech - native to Himalayas
- Syzygium cumini - jamu - native to South Asia
- Ziziphus zizyphus - jujube - native to Himalayas

== Fauna ==
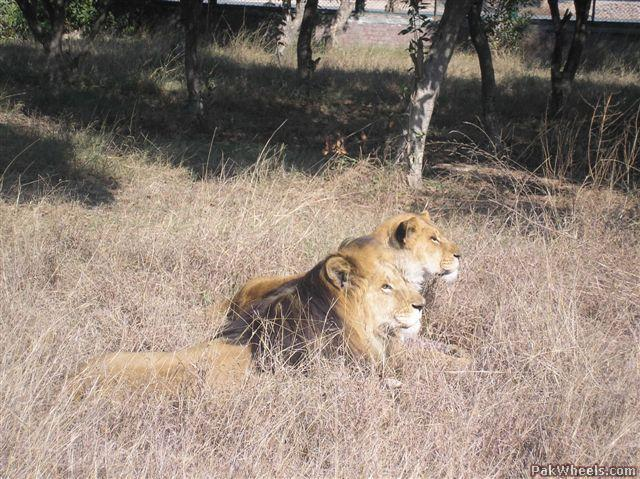
Lions in the Wildlife Safari Park

View of a mini-zoo in Sukh Chayn Gardens

Lahore Zoo is the main preserver of Lahore's fauna. Its animal exhibits include an aviary begun in 1872, a tiger house constructed in 1872 and renovated in 1987, an elephant house, a giraffe house, a deer house, a monkey house with both monkeys and great apes, crocodile ponds, and a snake house with various regional snakes, including the Indian cobra, Indian python, Indian sand boa and Russell's viper. Other popular wildlife centres are Jallo Park and Wildlife Safari Park.

=== Species list ===
List of animal species at Lahore Zoo

Aves

Accipitriformes

- Black kite
- Golden eagle
- Steppe eagle

Anseriformes

- Bar-headed goose
- Black swan
- Common shelduck
- Common teal
- Eurasian wigeon
- Gadwall
- Greater white-fronted goose
- Greylag goose (domestic goose)
- Mallard
- Muscovy duck
- Mute swan
- New Zealand scaup
- Red shoveler
- Ruddy shelduck
- Wood duck

Columbiformes

- Rock pigeon
  - Indian Fantail
- Western crowned pigeon

Galliformes

- Chukar partridge
- Common pheasant
- Emerald peafowl
  hybrid of green pheasant and Indian pheasant
- Golden pheasant
  - Yellow pheasant (mutation)
- Green peafowl
- Grey francolin
- Grey partridge
- Indian peafowl
- Silver pheasant
- Swinhoe's pheasant
- Vulturine guineafowl
- Wild turkey

Gruiformes

- Demoiselle crane
- Eurasian coot
- Houbara bustard

Pelecaniformes

- Dalmatian pelican
- Great white pelican

Phoenicopteriformes

- Greater flamingo
- Lesser flamingo

Psittaciformes

- Grey parrot
- Alexandrine parakeet
- Blossom-headed parakeet
- Blue-and-yellow macaw
- Budgerigar
- Cape parrot
- Lilian's lovebird
- Little corella
- Panama amazon
- Red-and-green macaw
- Rose-ringed parakeet
- Sulphur-crested cockatoo

Struthioniformes

- Emu
- Ostrich
- Southern cassowary

Mammals

Artiodactyla

- Bactrian camel (2)
- Blackbuck
- Chinkara (Indian gazelle)
- Chital (axis deer)
- Dromedary camel
- Fallow deer
- Giraffe (2)
- Hippopotamus (2)
- Hog deer
- Llama
- Nilgai
- Ovis orientalis
  - Mouflon (O. orientalis orientalis)
  - Urial (O. orientalis vignei)
- Red deer
- Sambar
- Sika deer
- Wild Boar

Carnivora

- Asian black bear (2)
- Bengal tiger
- Cougar (puma)
- European otter
- Indian wolf
- Jungle cat
- Leopard
- Lion

Lagomorpha

- European rabbit

Marsupials

- Red-necked wallaby

Perissodactyla

- Plains zebra
- White rhinoceros (2)

Primates

- Black-footed gray langur
- Capuchin monkey - unconfirmed
- Chimpanzee (3)
- Hamadryas baboon
- Mandrill
- Olive baboon
- Rhesus macaque
- Vervet monkey

Proboscidea

- African bush elephant (1)

Rodentia

- Guinea pig
- Indian crested porcupine

Reptiles

Crocodilia

- Gharial (Indian gavial)

Squamata

- Central Asian cobra (brown cobra)
- Common krait
- Diadem snake (rat snake)
- Enhydris - unidentified (water snake)
- Indian cobra (spectacled cobra)
- Indian python
- Indian sand boa
- Russell's viper
- Saw-scaled viper

Testudines

- Spur-thighed tortoise

=== Birds ===
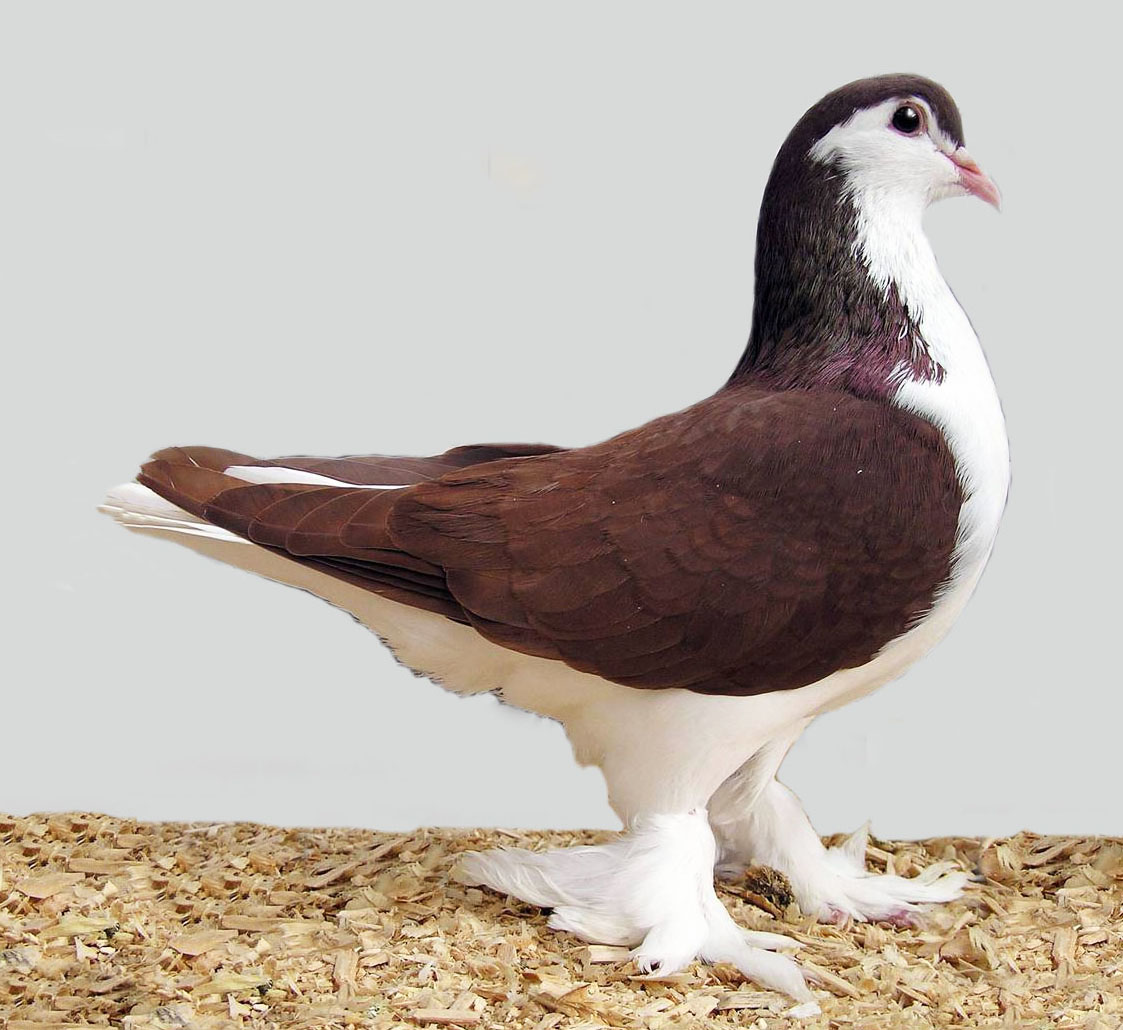
Lahore, a fancy pigeon breed originating in the area of Lahore

Although Lahore has expanded in area, alongside modern additions to the city are the ancient monuments, old gardens, graveyards, traditional bungalows with attached gardens, large expanses of lawn and old roadside trees. These green areas and old endemic trees of Lahore are home to many resident birds as well as providing to seasonal migrants. The grounds of different habitats such as Lahore Zoo and the Lawrence Gardens, Mayo and Jinnah Gardens, GOR, Jallo Park, Kinnaird College, Government College University, Aitchison College and many others are home to various bird species.

Ornithologists of preceding times documented the number of bird species in Lahore. According to one study conducted in 1965 there were 240 bird species. In another study (1992) only 101 bird species from the parks of Lahore were recorded. However, with an increase in the rate of urbanisation, the ecology of Lahore has been considerably affected and bird population reduced to 85, including both residents and migrants. Resident species include Indian grey hornbill, yellow-footed green pigeon, parakeets, bulbuls, doves, spotted owlet, Old World babblers, Old World flycatchers, mynas, woodpeckers, crows, black kites, ashy prinia, redstarts, warblers, red-wattled lapwing, kingfishers, and the Indian white-eye.

Three types of migratory birds are regular visitors to Punjab's provincial metropolis. These are winter visitors, summer visitors and transit migrants. The winter visitors come in September and stay until May. They come from northern latitudes and higher altitudes and include yellow-browed warbler, common starling, white wagtail, yellow wagtail and white-browed wagtail in search of food. The wagtails eat small insects, spiders, mollusks and soft seeds from moist soil. They roost in tall Typha and reed growth on the banks of ponds and lakes. Summer visitors arrive from southern parts of the country; these include Asian koel, purple sunbird, golden oriole and cuckoos. They also come here in search of food and for breeding. They stay in urban Lahore from March until September.

=== Changa Manga ===
The Changa Manga forest near Lahore is a hotspot for wildlife in Punjab. Wildlife within the borders of the plantation includes a small remnant populations of nilgai, hog deer, wild boar and possibly axis deer. Jackal and Asiatic wild cat can be found there as well. It also serves as a wildlife breeding center. Changa Manga plantation is an important place for restocking projects of Asiatic vultures in Pakistan. A Gyps Vulture Restoration Program was started in 2006 by WWF-Pakistan to conserve and breed endangered species of Gyps, especially the white-rumped vulture.
