= Indian Fantail =

Breed of pigeon

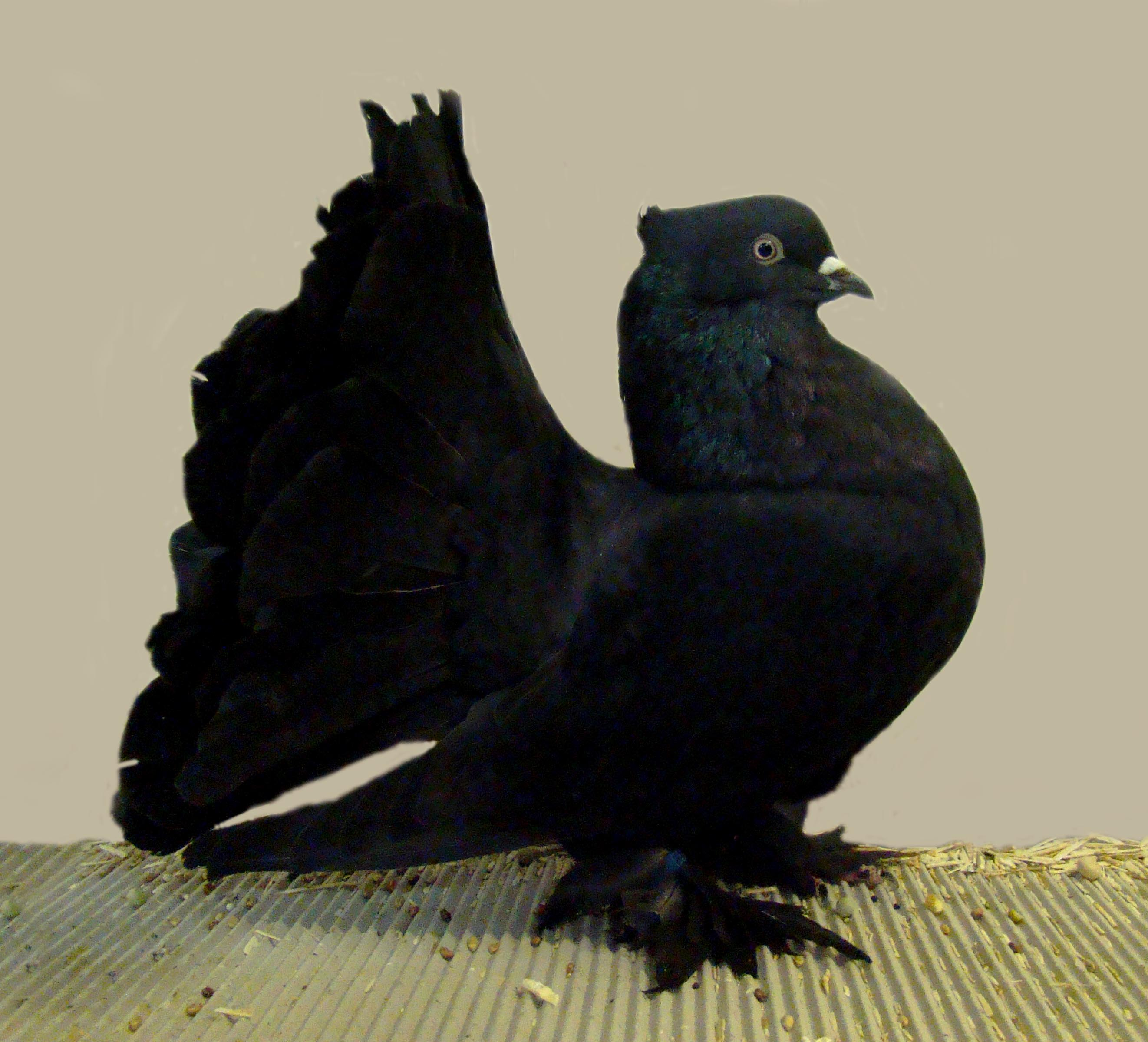
- Indian Fantail
- Conservation status: Common
- Country of origin: India

Traits
- Crest type: Peak crest
- Feather ornamentation: Fan tail

Classification
- Australian Breed Group: Group 1
- US Breed Group: Fancy
- EE Breed Group: Structure Pigeons

The Indian Fantail is a breed of fancy pigeon developed over many years of selective breeding. Indian Fantails, along with other varieties of domesticated pigeons, are all descendants of the rock dove (Columba livia).

== Description ==
The Fantail breed of pigeons is believed to have originated in India. It is thought that they may have been introduced to Europe by the Dutch. They were described by the poet of Akbar's court, Abu’l-Fazl, in 1590.

They have a distinct fan-shaped tail, and are bigger than the English Fantail pigeon and also have foot feathers and crests. Indian Fantail pigeons are most commonly white with light tan spots, although breeders have introduced more new colors. They walk on their toes. Their average weight is 13 ounces (369 g) and their average length is 11 inches (28 cm). The Indian Fantail stands upright, unlike the English fantail whose chest is carried upright so that it is higher than the bird's head, which rests back on the cushion formed by the tail feathers.

In recent years, a new variety of Indian Fantails has been developed in Pakistan, named American Fantails. It has the same attributes as the Indian Fantail except it is larger in size. Most Fantail clubs do not recognize it as a separate breed and consider it an oversized Indian Fantail. Moreover, the name "American Fantail" is used for the modern American variant of English Fantail in most countries outside Pakistan, India, and Bangladesh.

Indian Fantail pigeons usually lay 2 eggs in a clutch. Hatched fledglings take at least 4 to 6 weeks to fly and leave their home. However, they take feed from their parents until they are 6 weeks old. Usually, a breeding pair can lay eggs around or after 21 days from the first hatch.

== Gallery ==
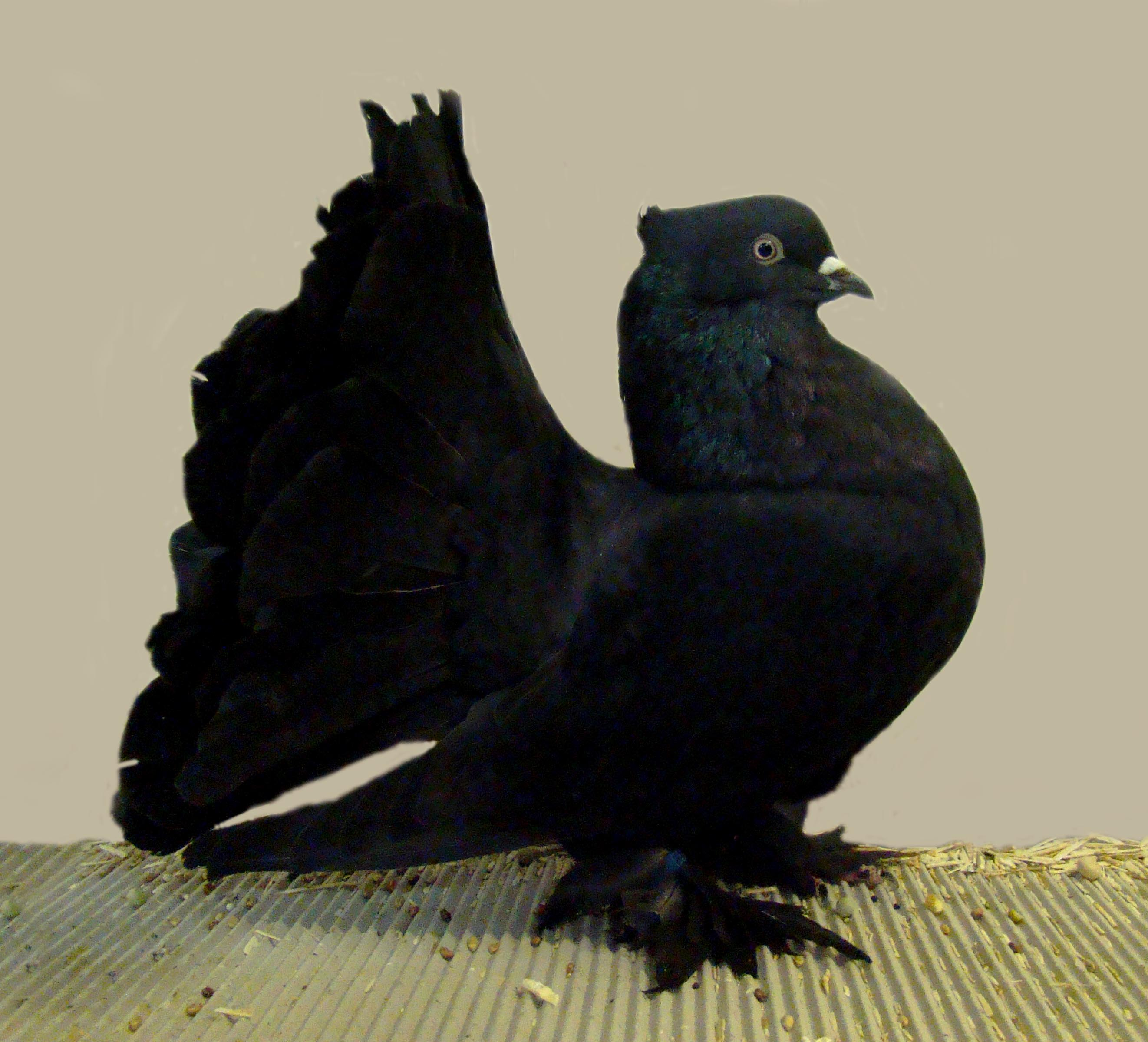
Indian Fantail Black

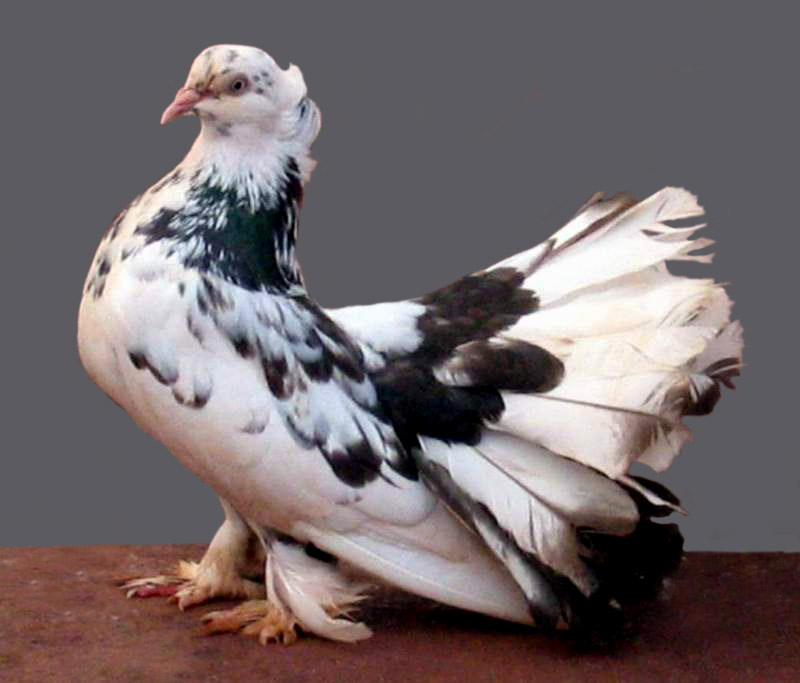
Indian Fantail Grizzle

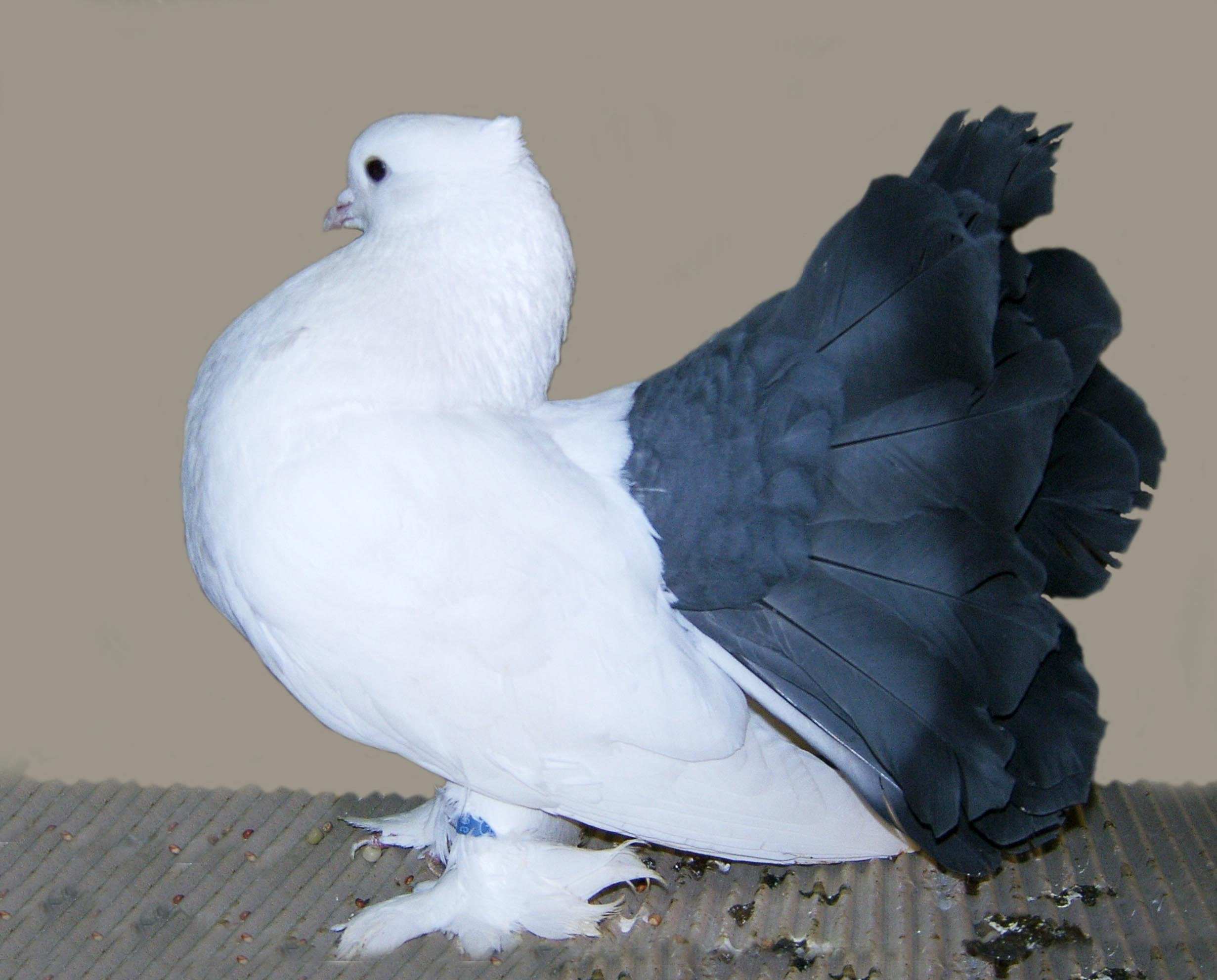
Indian Fantail Blue tail

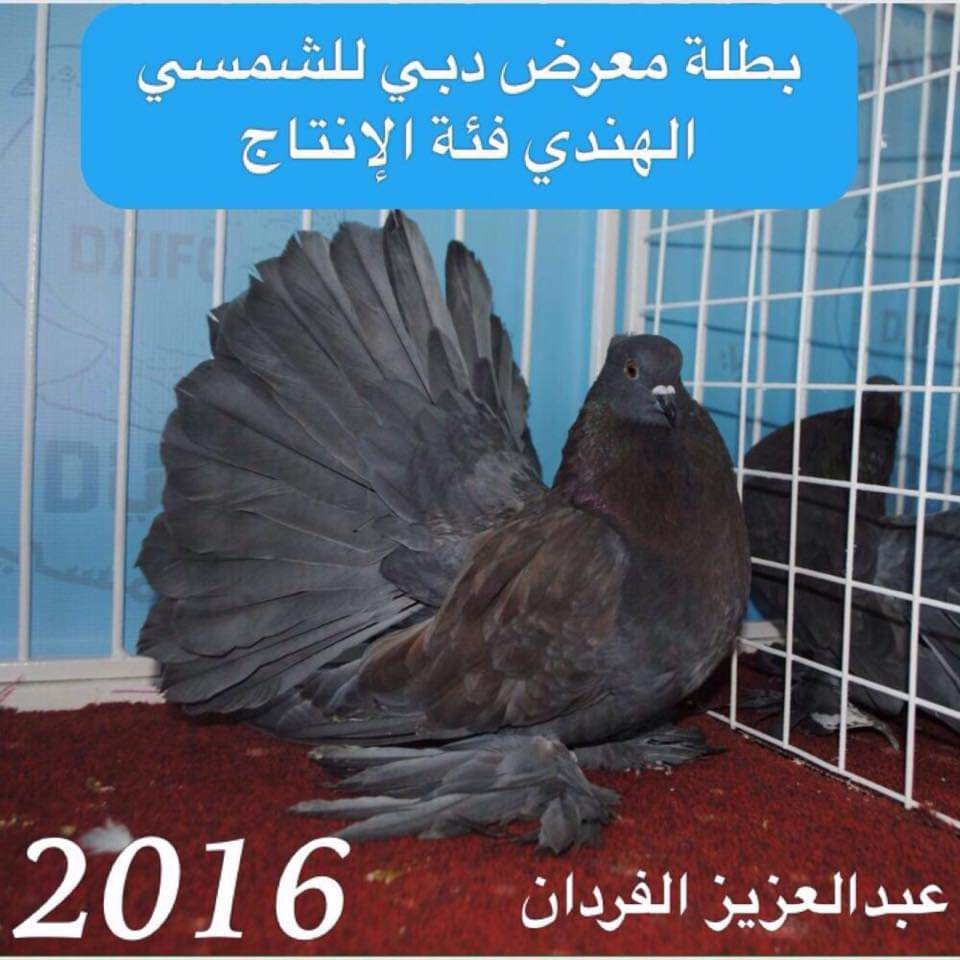
UAE show 2016

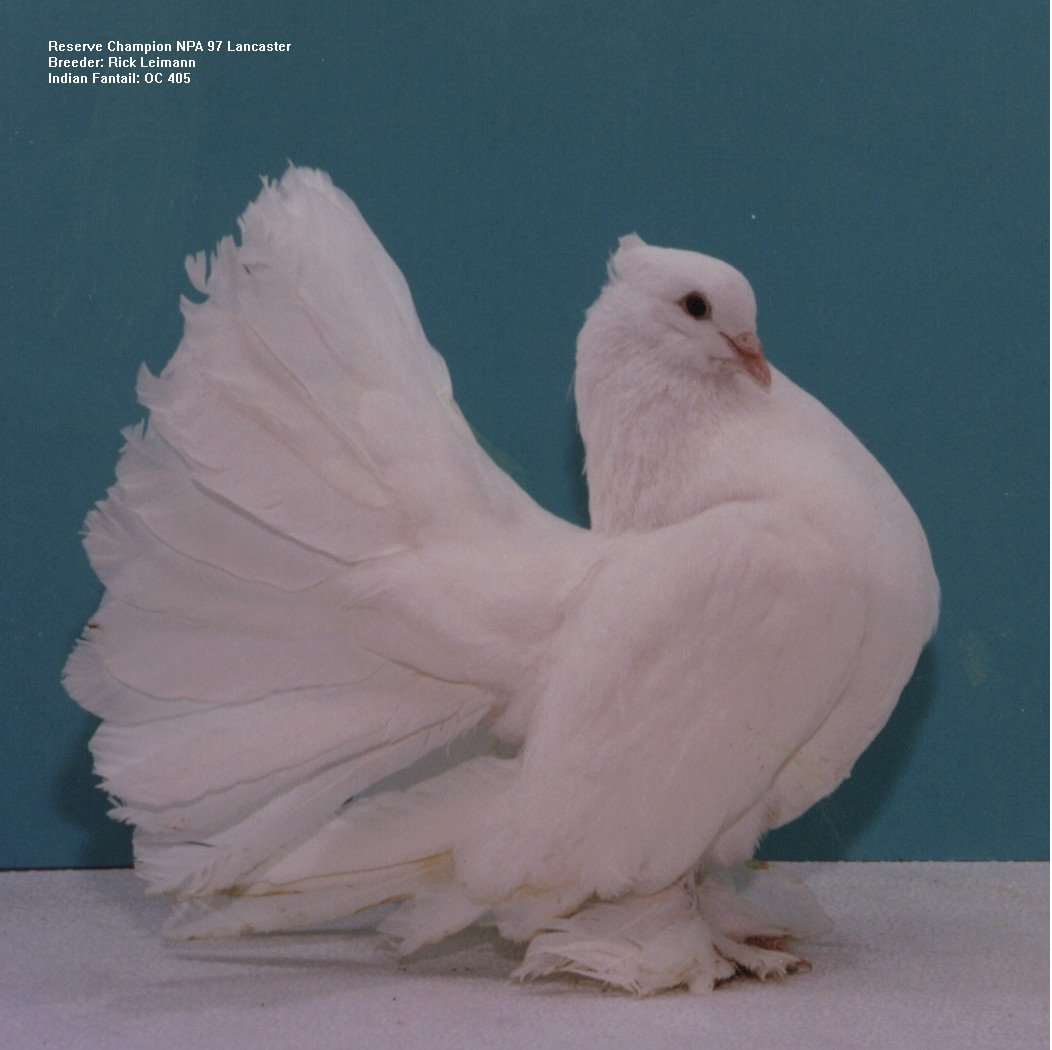
NPA show Lancaster 1997

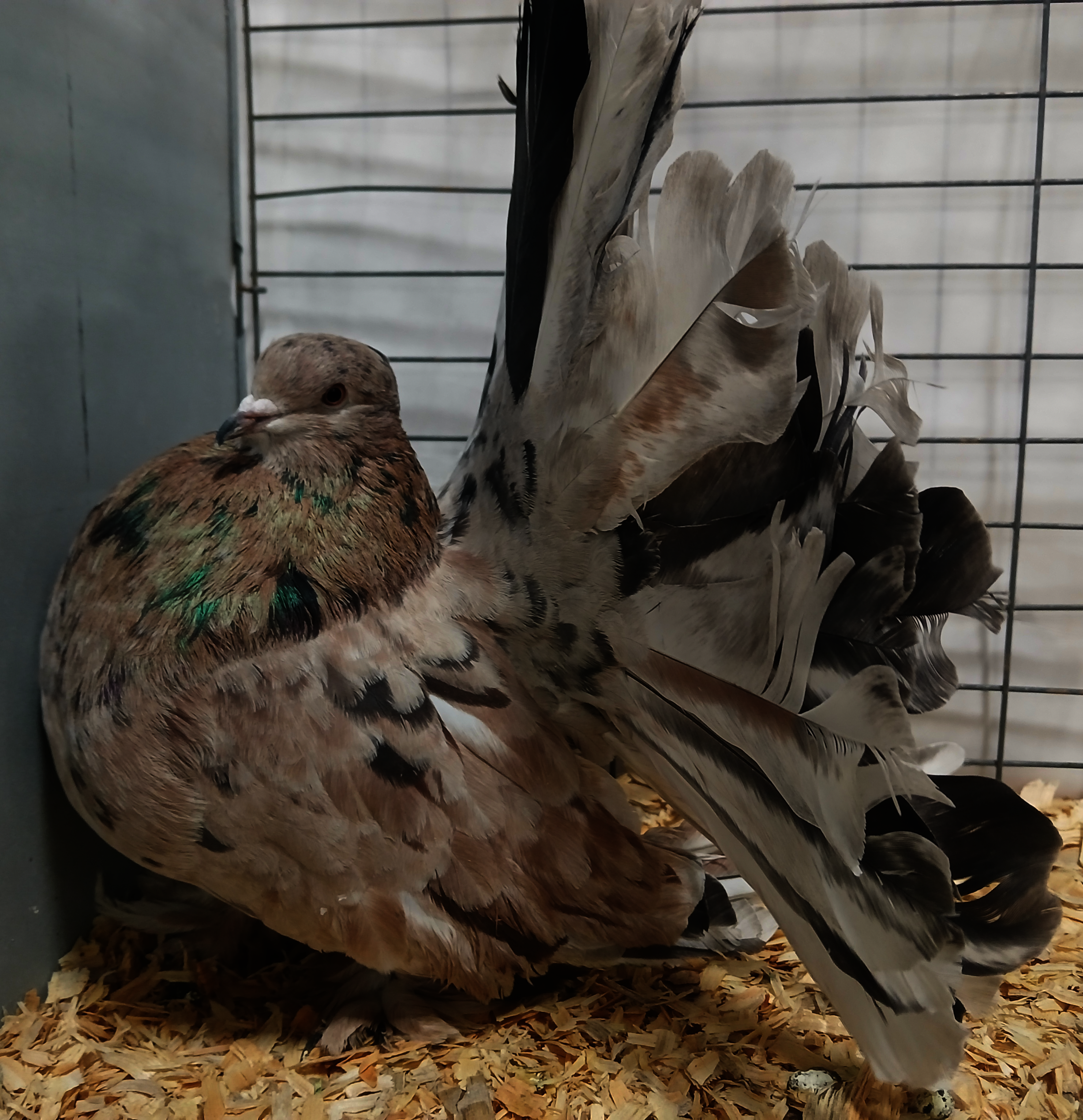
Almond NPA show 2026

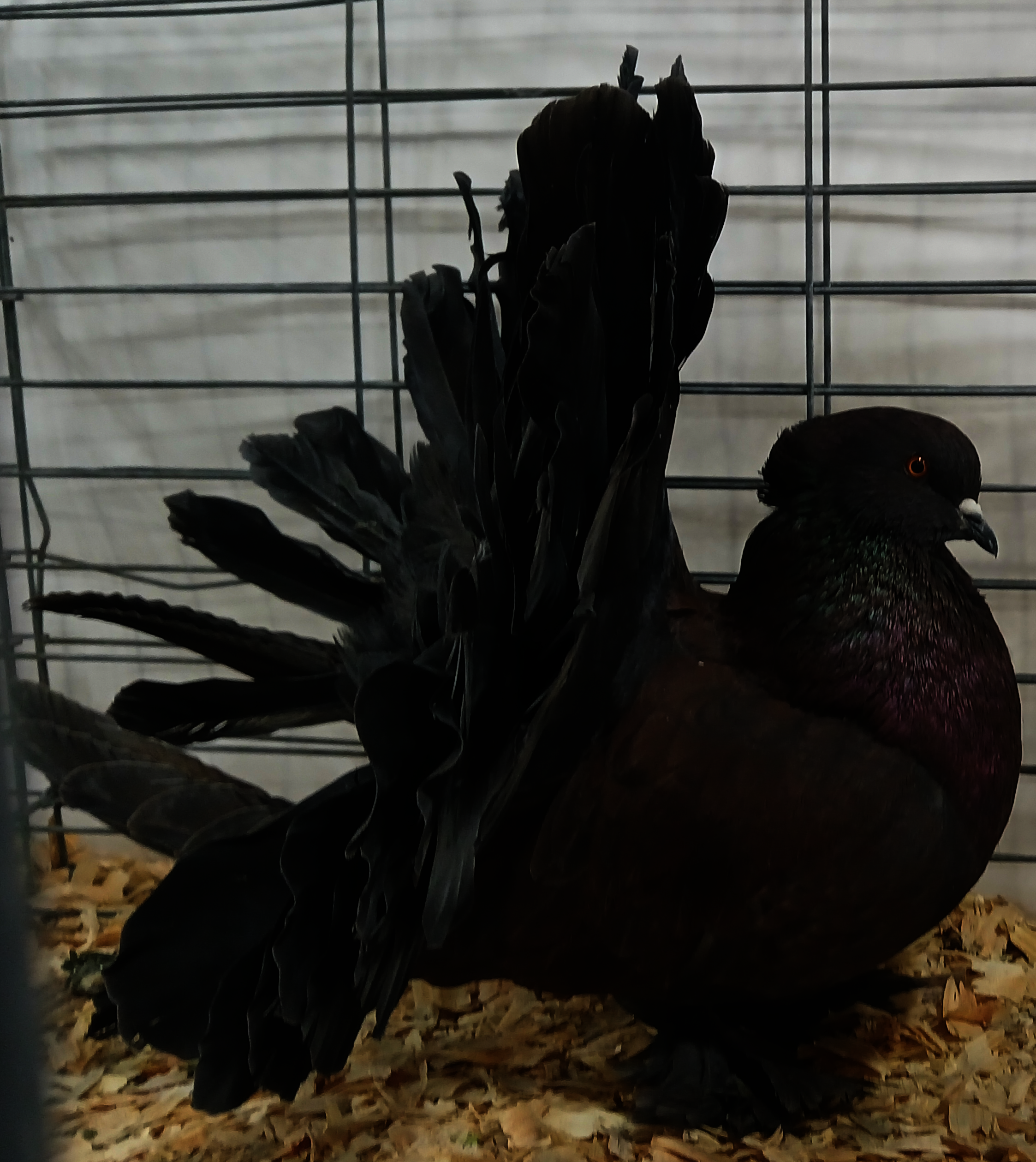
Bronze NPA show 2026

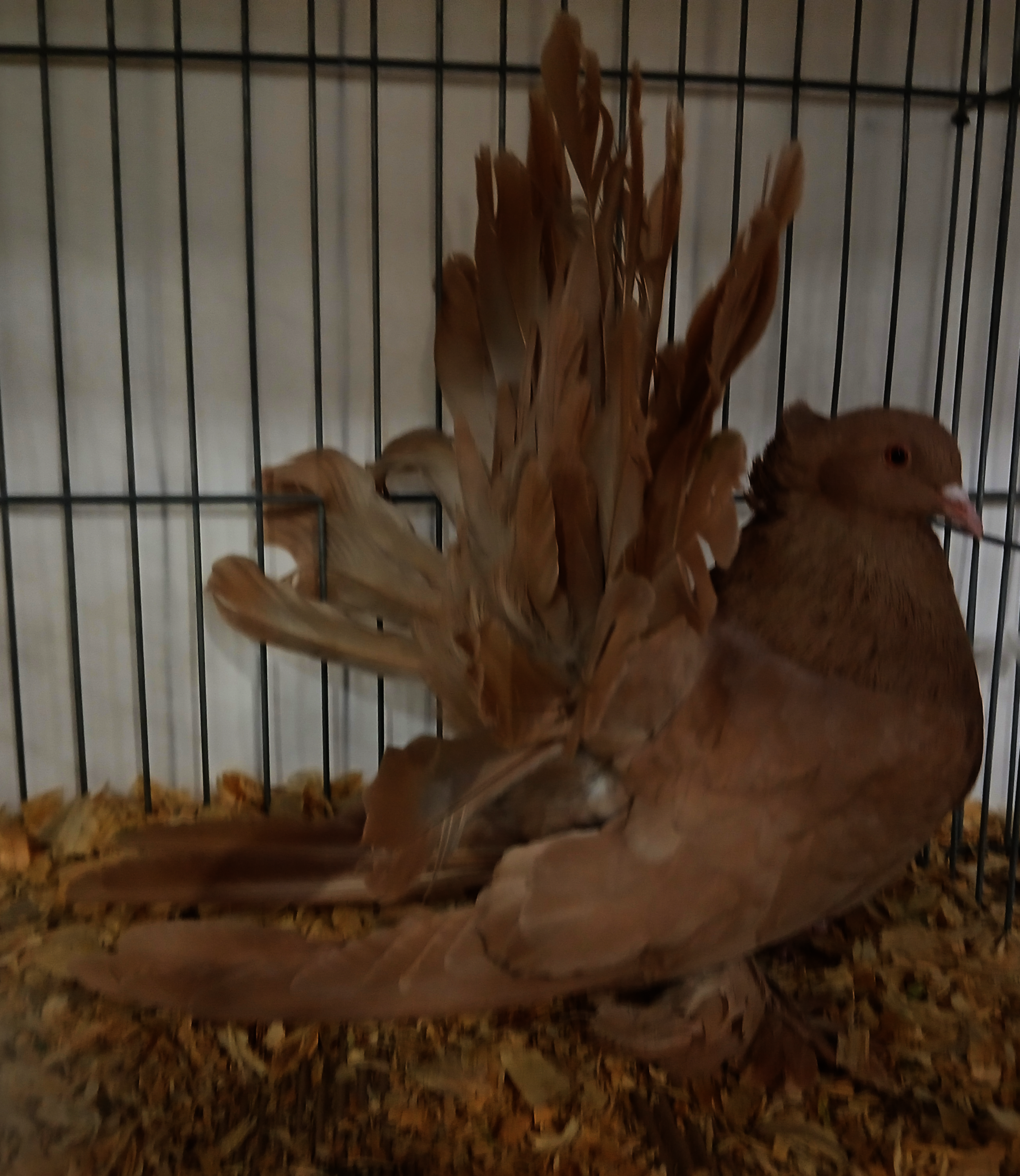
Yellow NPA show 2026

== See also ==
- Pigeon Diet
- Pigeon Housing
- List of pigeon breeds
