= Department of Forest and Wildlife (Punjab) =

Department of Forest and Wildlife Preservation
- ਵਣ ਅਤੇ ਜੰਗਲੀ ਜੀਵ ਸੁੱਰਖਿਆ ਵਿਭਾਗ

Agency overview
- Formed: 1966
- Jurisdiction: Punjab
- Headquarters: Mohali
- Minister responsible: Minister for Forests and Wildlife;
- Website: http://www.pbforests.gov.in/

Punjab Forest and Wildlife Department is a law enforcement agency for the state of Punjab, India. It focus primarily on forest development and wildlife conservation. Also it introduce various acts, policies for Forestry Research, Soil Conservation, Forest Management and Eco Tourism.

Its headquarters is located in Sector-68, Mohali, Punjab.

== Wildlife Protected Areas ==
There are 12 Wildlife Sanctuary, two Zoological Park/Tiger Safari, three Dear Parks and two community reserves in Punjab which is managed by this department. Following is list of same:

1. Bir chahal Wildlife Sanctuary - Mansa
2. Bir Dosanjh Wildlife Sanctuary - Patiala
3. Bir Bhadson Wildlife Sanctuary - Patiala
4. Bir Mehas Wildlife Sanctuary - Patiala
5. Bir Gurdialpura Wildlife Sanctuary - Patiala
6. Bir Aishwan Wildlife Sanctuary - Sangrur
7. Harike Wildlife Sanctuary - Ferozepur
8. Takhni-Rehmapur Wildlife Sanctuary - Hoshiarpur
9. Abohar Wildlife Sanctuary - Ferozepur
10. Jhajjar Bacholi Wildlife Sanctuary - Rupnagar
11. Kathlaur-Kaushlian Wildlife Sanctuary - Gurdaspur
12. Bir Bunerheri Wildlife Sanctuary, Patiala

Following are parks:

1. Mohindra Chaudhary Zoological Park - Chhatbir, Mohali
2. Tiger Safari - Ludhiana
3. Deer Park - Neelon Ludhiana
4. Deer Park Bir Moti Bagh - Patiala
5. Deer Park Bir Talab - Bhatinda

Following are community reserves:

1. Lalwan Community Reserve - Hoshiarpur
2. Keshopur-Chhamb Community Reserve - Gurdaspur
