= Bir Bunerheri Wildlife Sanctuary =

Wildlife sanctuary in India

Bir Bhunerheri Wildlife Sanctuary
- IUCN category IV (habitat/species management area)
- Location within Punjab Location within India
- Interactive map of Bir Bhunerheri Wildlife Sanctuary
- Location: Patiala district, Punjab, India
- Nearest city: Patiala
- Coordinates: 30°11′24″N 76°27′36″E
- Area: 661.66 ha (1,635.0 acres)
- Established: 1952
- Governing body: Department of Forests & Wildlife Preservation, Government of Punjab

Bir Bhunerheri Wildlife Sanctuary is a wildlife sanctuary located in the Patiala district of the Indian state of Punjab. It covers approximately 661.66 hectares and is one of several small "bir" (forest) sanctuaries in the region.

== History ==
The area known as Bir Bhunerheri was historically one of the bir (forest patches) associated with the erstwhile princely state of Patiala. Following India's independence, the Punjab Government notified these areas as reserved forests and wildlife sanctuaries. Bir Bhunerheri was officially declared a protected area in 1952.

== Geography and ecology ==
The sanctuary lies on the Patiala–Devigarh road, roughly 15 km from Patiala city. Its terrain features dry deciduous vegetation typical of central Punjab, with trees such as Shisham (Dalbergia sissoo) and Kikar (Acacia nilotica).

== Conservation and threats ==
The sanctuary is affected by pressures from nearby agriculture and urbanization. Forest officials and conservation groups have reported seasonal threats such as crop-residue (stubble) burning in adjoining farmlands, which harms local wildlife and vegetation. Protection and management activities are overseen by the Department of Forests & Wildlife Preservation, Government of Punjab.

In April 2025, the Punjab Cabinet declared the sanctuary — along with 12 other sanctuaries in the state as Eco-Sensitive Zone (ESZ), prohibiting any construction activity within 100 metres of its boundary.

== See also ==
- Bir Aishvan Wildlife Sanctuary
