= Bir Aishvan Wildlife Sanctuary =

Wildlife sanctuary in Punjab, India

Bir Aishwan Wildlife Sanctuary
- IUCN category IV (habitat/species management area)
- Location within Punjab Location within India
- Interactive map of Bir Aishwan Wildlife Sanctuary
- Location: Sangrur district, Punjab, India
- Coordinates: 30.242°N 75.840°E
- Area: 2.64 km^{2} (1.02 sq mi)
- Established: 28 February 1952
- Governing body: Department of Forest and Wildlife (Punjab)

Bir Aishwan Wildlife Sanctuary—also locally known as Sohian Bir—is a wildlife sanctuary located approximately 3 km from Sangrur city in Sangrur district, in the Indian state of Punjab. It was declared as a sanctuary on 28 February 1952. It covers an area of 264.40 hectares (≈ 2.64 km²).

== Wildlife and habitat ==
The sanctuary supports species such as blue bull (nilgai), jackal, hare, jungle cat, rhesus macaque, spotted owlet, and black and grey partridge.

== Conservation & management ==
In a 2018 report, it was revealed that over 4,000 native trees were cut in Bir Aishwan Wildlife Sanctuary under a forest restoration plan, despite official guidelines restricting removal to invasive species only.

In September 2022, a team led by officials from the Wildlife Institute of India and Punjab Forest Department conducted a habitat survey at Bir Aishwan to assess its suitability for blackbuck relocation from Abohar Wildlife Sanctuary, where that species has been under threat from feral dogs and habitat loss. The survey found that semi-arid plains, sand dunes, intermittent fallow land, and sparse vegetation make it potentially suitable for blackbuck habitation.

Following reports of a leopard sighting near the sanctuary in September 2023, the Sangrur administration established a rapid response team to respond to such wildlife incidents in the area.

In April 2025, the Punjab Cabinet declared the Bir Aishwan Wildlife Sanctuary — along with 12 other sanctuaries in the state as Eco-Sensitive Zone (ESZ), prohibiting any construction activity within 100 metres of its boundary.

== Threats ==
The sanctuary—and other "bir" forests—are at risk each year from stubble burning in nearby agricultural lands. Punjab Forest Department maintains patrol units and enforces no-burn buffer zones up to 100 m inside sanctuary boundaries, following central government SOPs.

== See also ==
- Wildlife Protection Act, 1972
