= Cologne Tumbler =

Breed of pigeon

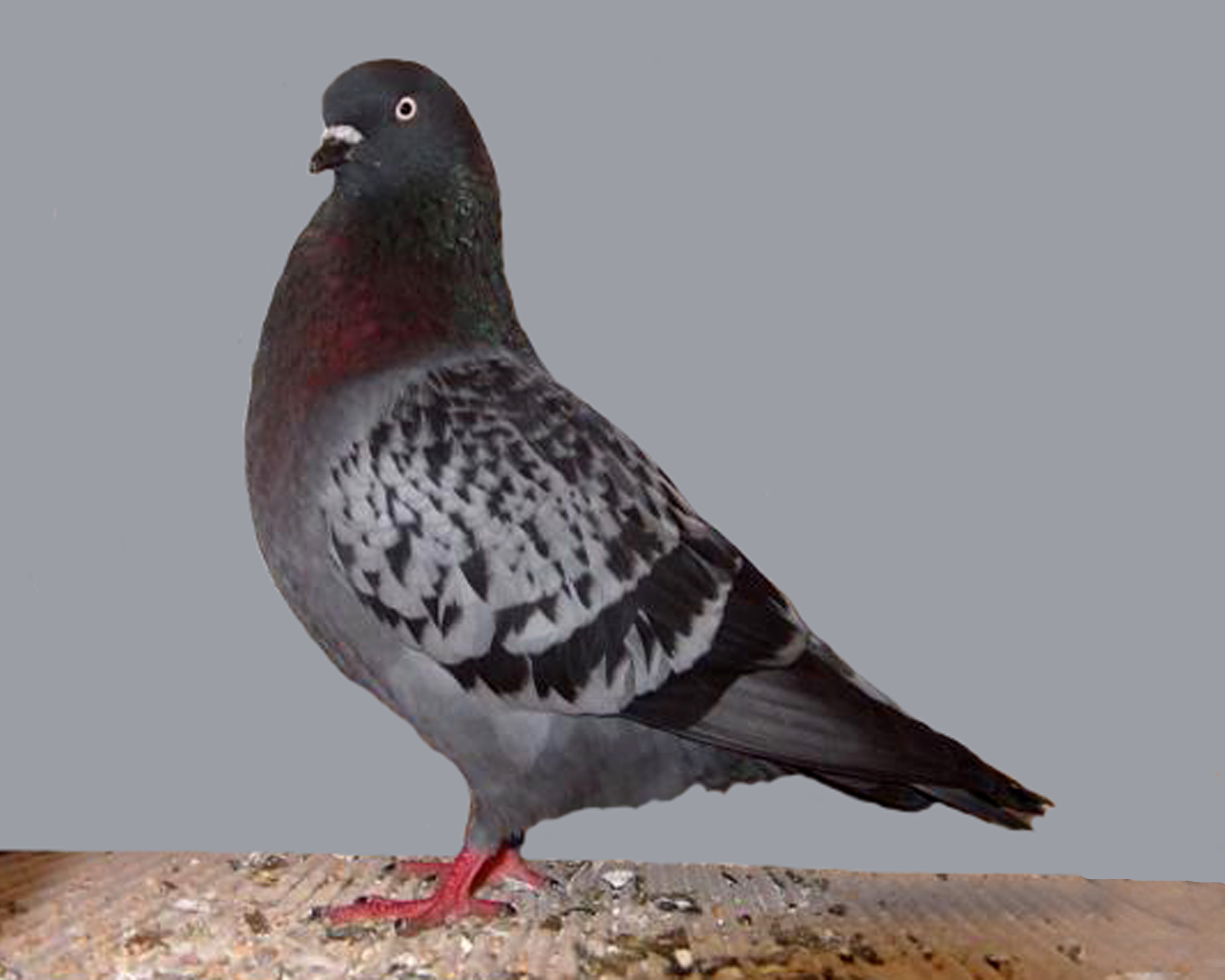
- Blue checquer
- Country of origin: Netherlands

Classification
- Australian Breed Group: Not listed
- US Breed Group: Tumblers, Rollers, and Highflyers
- EE Breed Group: Tumblers and Highflyers

Notes
- This breed comes in many colors and markings with white eyes

The Cologne Tumbler is a breed of fancy pigeon. Cologne Tumblers, along with other varieties of domesticated pigeons, are all descendants from the rock pigeon (Columba livia). The Cologne Tumbler pigeon originates in the Netherlands and is found in clean legged and muffled varieties.

== Tumbling ==
Pigeon tumbling is known as the act of performing a flip while flying. Many birds are bred specifically to perform this action, though it has been noted in pigeons since 1600 B.C.E. Darwin found this to be a rather extraordinary genetic variation.

== Gallery ==
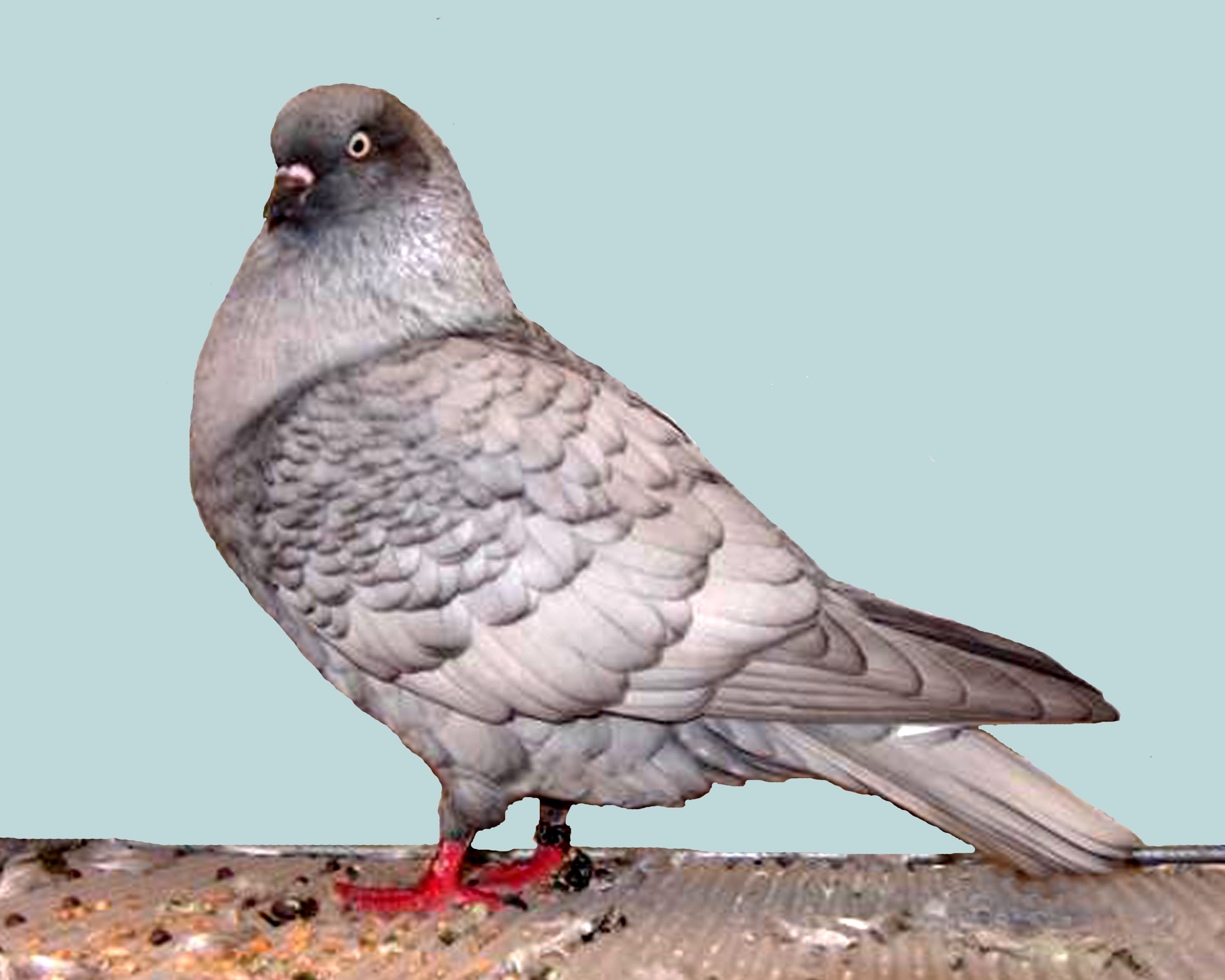
Reduced Cologne Tumbler

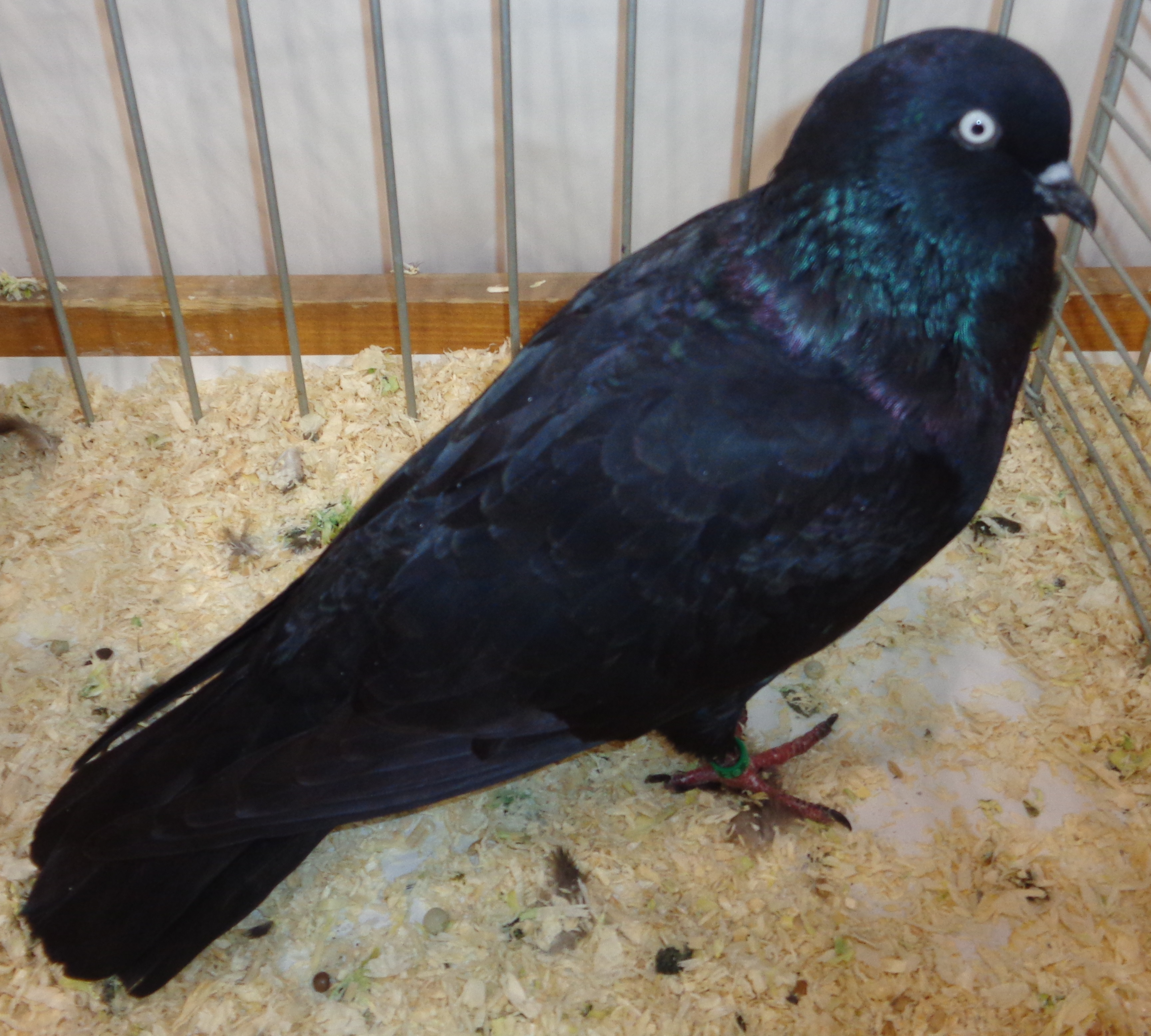
Black Cologne Tumbler

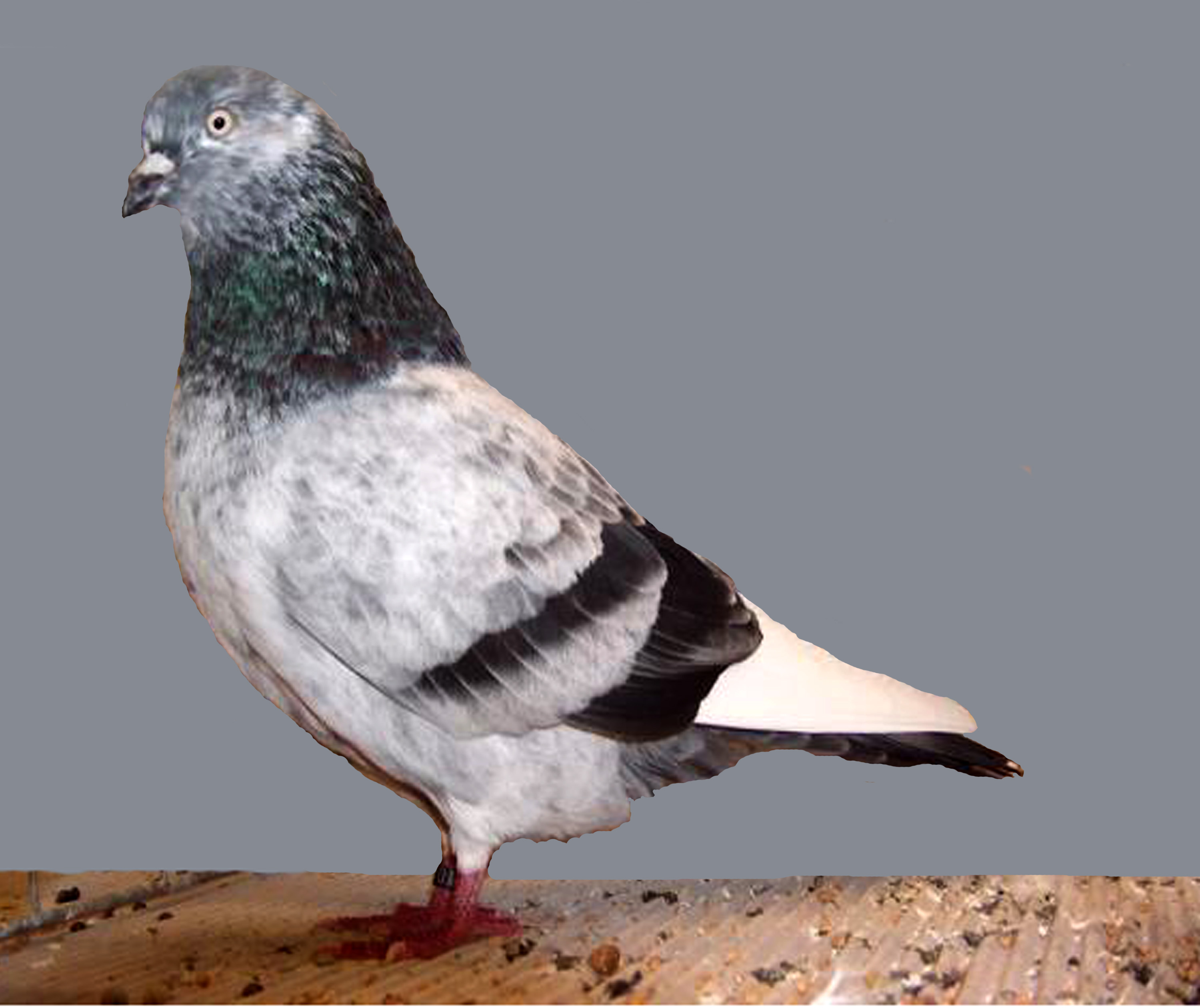
Grizzle Cologne Tumbler

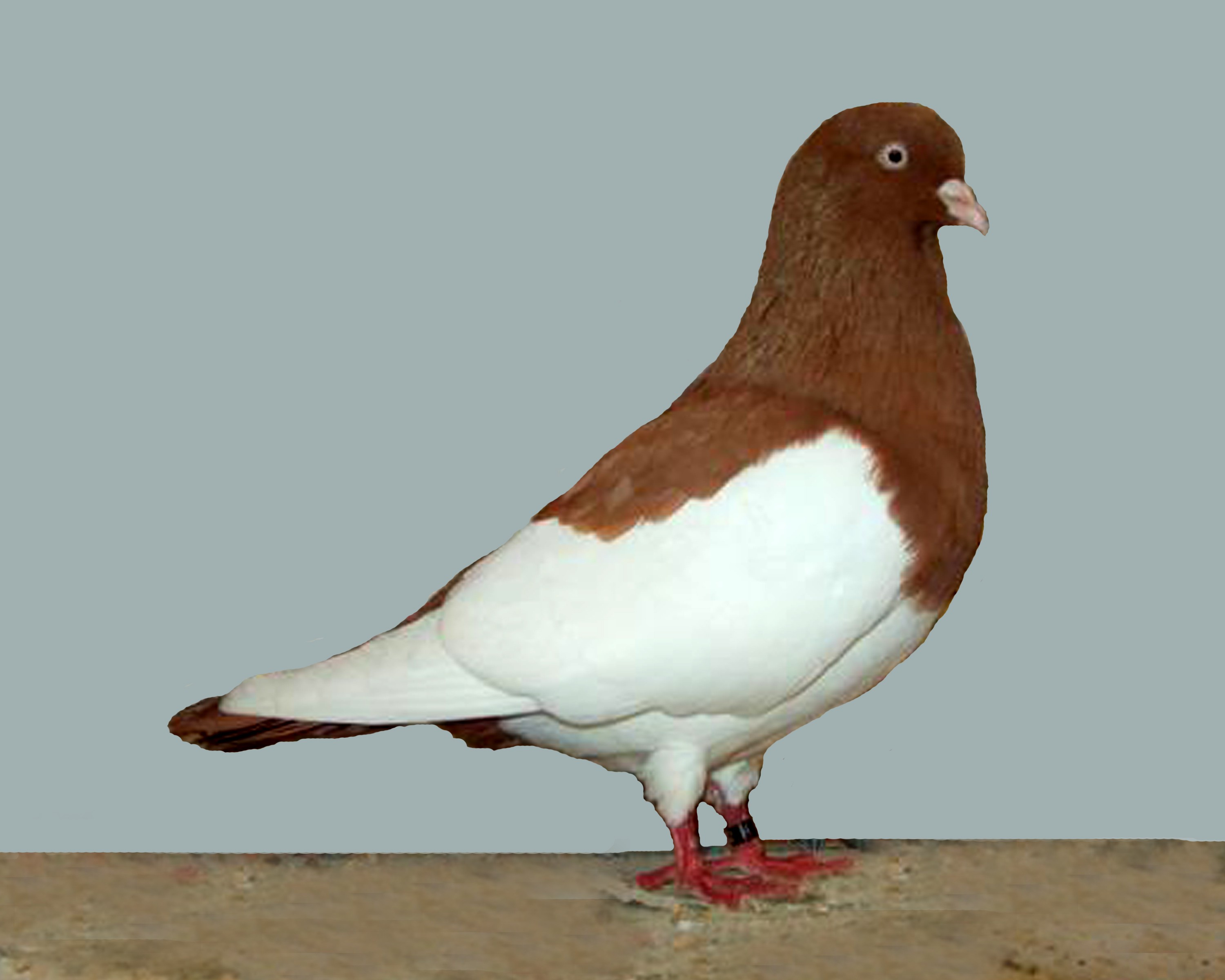
Magpied marked Cologne Tumbler

== See also ==
- Pigeon Diet
- Pigeon Housing
- List of pigeon breeds
