= Lucerne Gold Collar =

Breed of pigeon

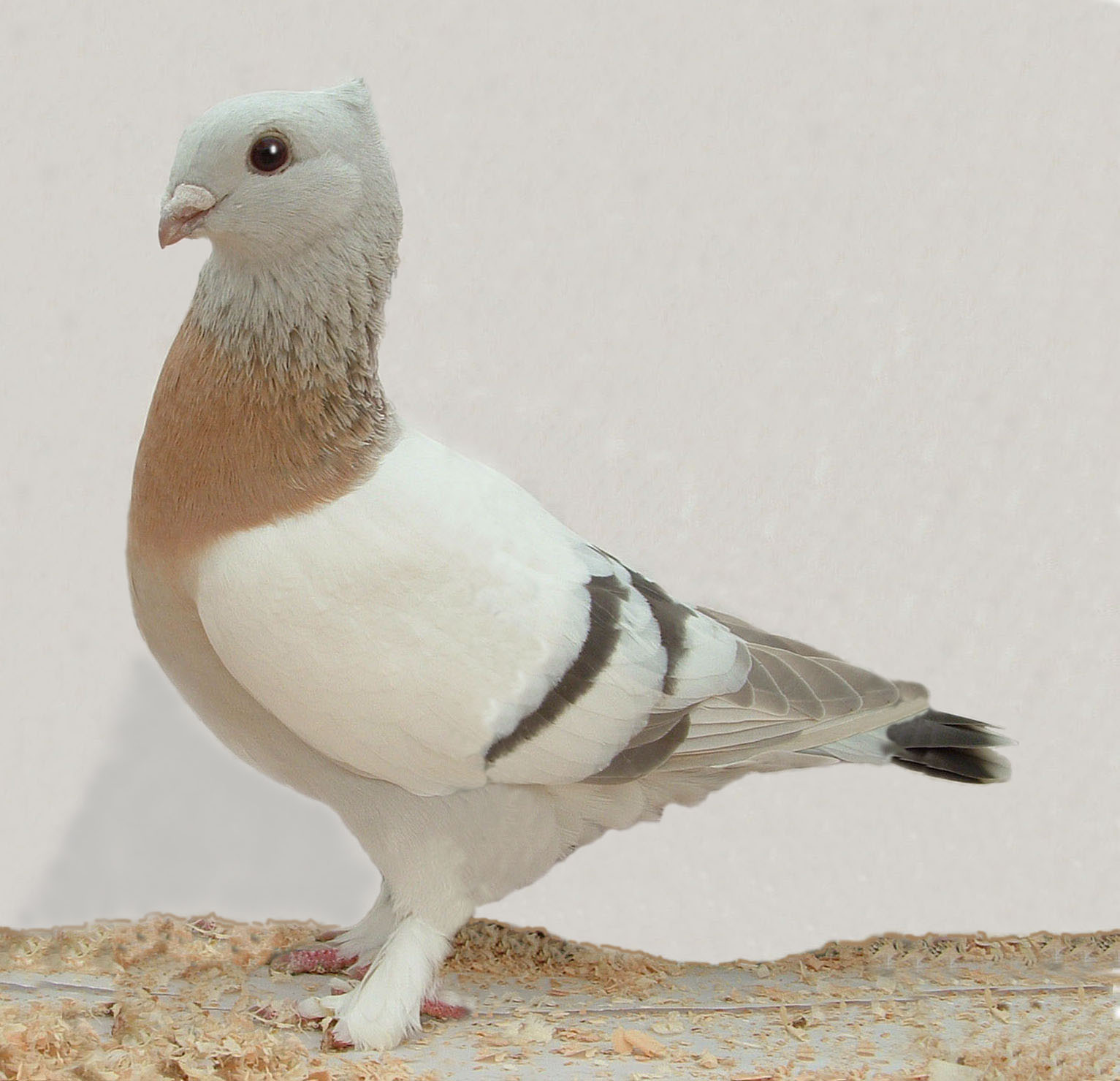
- Lucerne Gold Collar
- Conservation status: Common
- Country of origin: Switzerland

Traits
- Crest type: Peak
- Feather ornamentation: Gold colored neck

Classification
- Australian Breed Group: not listed
- US Breed Group: Color
- EE Breed Group: Colour pigeons (CH/421)

The Lucerne Gold Collar is a breed of fancy pigeon developed over many years of selective breeding. Lucerne Gold Collars, along with other varieties of domesticated pigeons, are all descendants from the rock pigeon (Columba livia). The collar is required to be a rich but clear golden yellow.

== History ==
This breed as the name suggests originated in Lucerne, Switzerland. The breed is a variety of Swiss Lucerne peak crested pigeon.

== Gallery ==
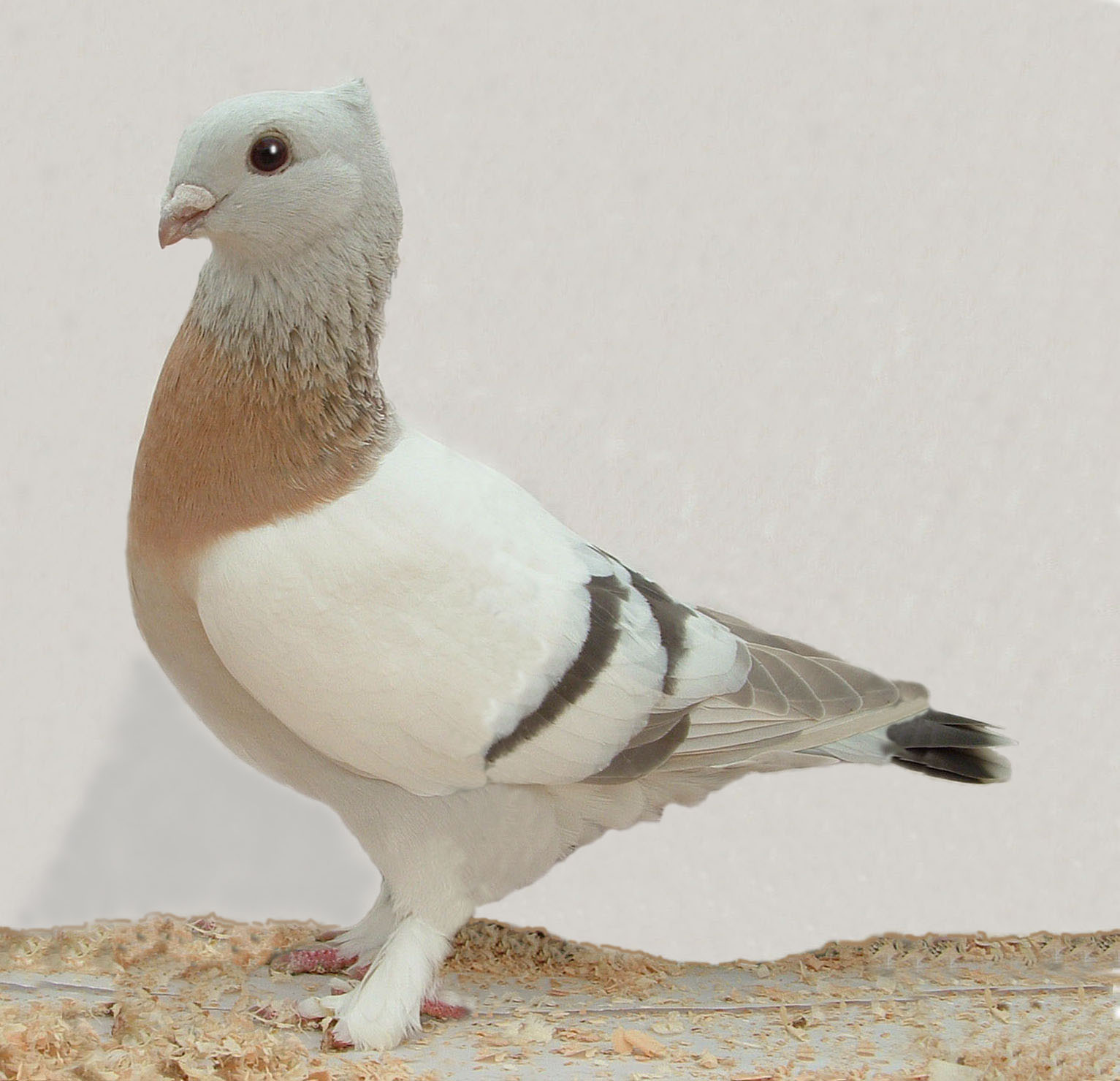
Gold collar Lucerne

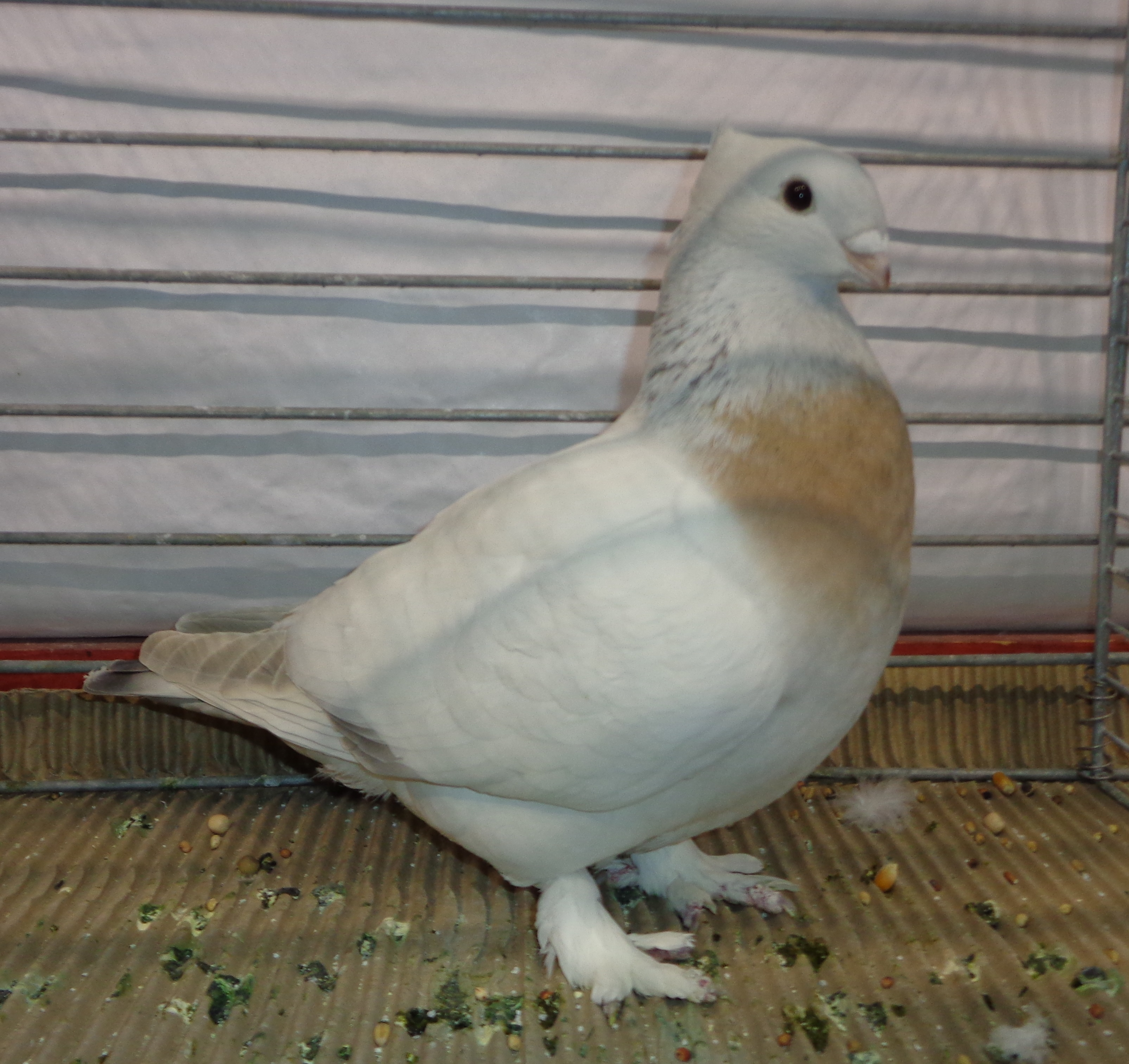
Barless Lucernois

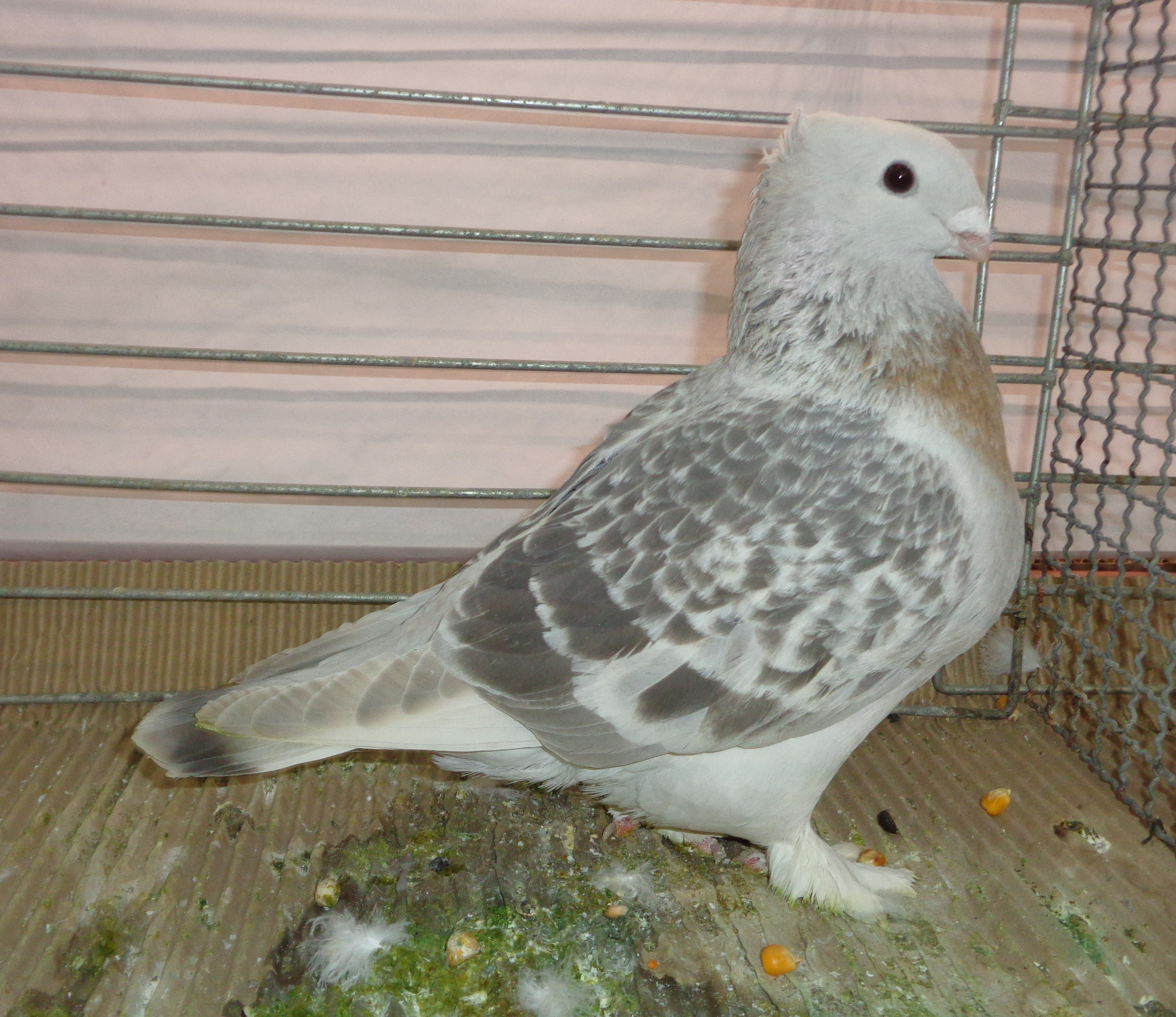
Checkered Lucernois

== See also ==
- Pigeon Diet
- Pigeon Housing
- List of pigeon breeds
