= Evil =

Opposite or absence of good

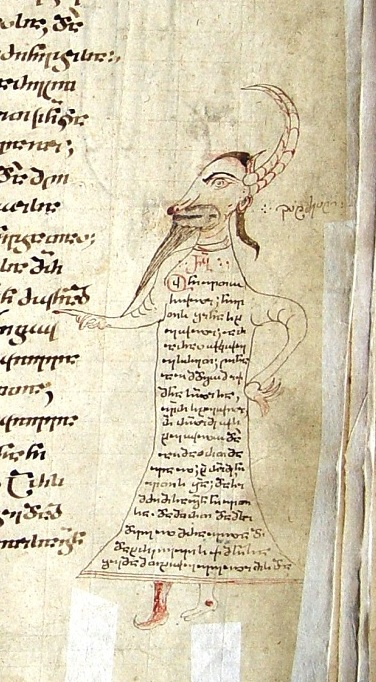
In many Abrahamic religions, demons are considered to be evil beings and are contrasted with angels, who are their good counterparts.

Evil, as a concept, is usually defined as profound immorality, and it is related to acts that cause pain and suffering to others.

Evil is commonly seen as the opposite, or sometimes absence, of good. It can be an extremely broad concept, although in everyday usage it is often more narrowly used to talk about profound wickedness and against common good. It is generally seen as taking multiple possible forms, such as the form of personal moral evil commonly associated with the word, or impersonal natural evil (as in the case of natural disasters or illnesses), and in religious thought, the form of the demonic or supernatural/eternal. While some religions, world views, and philosophies focus on "good versus evil", others deny evil's existence and usefulness in describing people.

Evil can denote profound immorality, but typically not without some basis in the understanding of the human condition, where strife and suffering (cf. Hinduism) are the true roots of evil. In certain religious contexts, evil has been described as a supernatural force. Definitions of evil vary, as does the analysis of its motives. Elements that are commonly associated with personal forms of evil involve unbalanced behavior, including anger, revenge, hatred, injustice, psychological trauma, expediency, selfishness, pride, ignorance, jealousy, prejudice, destruction, and neglect.

In some forms of thought, evil is also sometimes perceived in absolute terms as the dualistic antagonistic binary opposite to good, in which good should prevail and evil should be defeated. In cultures with Buddhist spiritual influence, both good and evil are perceived as part of an antagonistic duality that itself must be overcome through achieving Nirvana. The ethical questions regarding good and evil are subsumed into three major areas of study: meta-ethics, concerning the nature of good and evil; normative ethics, concerning how human beings ought to behave; and applied ethics, concerning particular moral issues. While the term is applied to events and conditions without agency, the forms of evil addressed in this article presume one or more evildoers.

== Etymology ==
The modern English word evil (Old English yfel) and its cognates such as the German Übel and Dutch euvel are widely considered to come from a Proto-Germanic reconstructed form of *ubilaz, comparable to the Hittite huwapp- ultimately from the Proto-Indo-European form *wap- and suffixed zero-grade form *up-elo-. Other later Germanic forms include Middle English evel, ifel, ufel, Old Frisian evel (adjective and noun), Old Saxon ubil, Old High German ubil, and Gothic ubils.

== Chinese moral philosophy ==
Evil is translated as 惡 in Chinese. The duty of the emperor and of his officials is to restrain it, thus preserving the cosmic order.

The nature of good and evil was also ascertainable by natural faculties without the need for revelation—"one will not achieve a perfect perception of good and evil if one has not exactly examined the nature and reason of things."

Offenses against the Three Bonds and the Five Constants

Chinese cosmology, moral philosophy and law regard offenses against the Five Constants with particular abhorrence—anything that diminished the proper relationship between ruler and subject, father and son, husband and wife, elder and younger, and between mutual friends was a violation of the cosmic order and heinous. Anything that went against the Way embedded in the order of human relationships was considered vile, and invited the displeasure of Heaven and ghosts, who were seen as inflicting retribution through the instrumentality of legal punishments on earth. Chinese moral and legal philosophy views the violation of family and kinship order with particular abhorrence, considering it especially heinous. In assessing the degree of evil, not only the severity of the effect against the life, health or dignity of a person is considered, but also the relational distance.

Ten Abominations ("十惡")

The Ming Legal Code identified Ten Abominations—categories of prohibited conduct so abhorrent and heinous that the usual considerations of pardon would not apply—these include plotting rebellion, great sedition, treason, parricide, depravity (the murder of three or more innocent persons or the use of magical curses), great irreverence (lèse-majesté), lack of filial piety, discord, unrighteousness and incest (fornication with relatives of fourth degree of mourning or less, or relationships with one's father's wife and concubines).

Other views

As with Buddhism, in Confucianism or Taoism there is no direct analogue to the way good and evil are opposed although reference to demonic influence is common in Chinese folk religion. Confucianism's primary concern is with correct social relationships and the behavior appropriate to the learned or superior man. Thus evil would correspond to wrong behavior. Still less does it map into Taoism, in spite of the centrality of dualism in that system, but the opposite of the cardinal virtues of Taoism, compassion, moderation, and humility can be inferred to be the analogue of evil in it.

== European philosophy ==
In response to the practices of Nazi Germany, Hannah Arendt concluded that "the problem of evil would be the fundamental problem of postwar intellectual life in Europe", although such a focus did not come to fruition.

=== Spinoza ===
Baruch Spinoza states

1. By good, I understand that which we certainly know is useful to us.
2. By evil, on the contrary, I understand that which we certainly know hinders us from possessing anything that is good.

Spinoza assumes a quasi-mathematical style and states these further propositions which he purports to prove or demonstrate from the above definitions in part IV of his Ethics:

- Proposition 8 "Knowledge of good or evil is nothing but affect of joy or sorrow in so far as we are conscious of it."
- Proposition 30 "Nothing can be evil through that which it possesses in common with our nature, but in so far as a thing is evil to us it is contrary to us."
- Proposition 64 "The knowledge of evil is inadequate knowledge."
  - Corollary "Hence it follows that if the human mind had none but adequate ideas, it would form no notion of evil."
- Proposition 65 "According to the guidance of reason, of two things which are good, we shall follow the greater good, and of two evils, follow the less."
- Proposition 68 "If men were born free, they would form no conception of good and evil so long as they were free."

== Psychology ==
=== Carl Jung ===
Carl Jung, in his book Answer to Job and elsewhere, depicted evil as the dark side of God. People tend to believe evil is something external to them, because they project their shadow onto others. Jung interpreted the story of Jesus as an account of God facing his own shadow.

=== Philip Zimbardo ===
In 2007, Philip Zimbardo suggested that people may act in evil ways as a result of a collective identity. This hypothesis, based on his previous experience from the Stanford prison experiment, was published in the book The Lucifer Effect: Understanding How Good People Turn Evil.

=== Milgram experiment ===
In 1961, Stanley Milgram began an experiment to help explain how thousands of ordinary, non-deviant, people could have reconciled themselves to a role in the Holocaust. Participants were led to believe they were assisting in an unrelated experiment in which they had to inflict electric shocks on another person. The experiment unexpectedly found that most could be led to inflict the electric shocks, including shocks that would have been fatal if they had been real. The participants tended to be uncomfortable and reluctant in the role. Nearly all stopped at some point to question the experiment, but most continued after being reassured.

A 2014 re-assessment of Milgram's work argued that the results should be interpreted with the "engaged followership" model: that people are not simply obeying the orders of a leader, but instead are willing to continue the experiment because of their desire to support the scientific goals of the leader and because of a lack of identification with the learner. Thomas Blass argues that the experiment explains how people can be complicit in roles such as "the dispassionate bureaucrat who may have shipped Jews to Auschwitz with the same degree of routinization as potatoes to Bremerhaven". However, like James Waller, he argues that it cannot explain an event like the Holocaust. Unlike the perpetrators of the Holocaust, the participants in Milgram's experiment were reassured that their actions would cause little harm and had little time to contemplate their actions.

== Religions ==
=== Abrahamic ===
==== Baháʼí Faith ====
The Baháʼí Faith asserts that evil is non-existent and that it is a concept reflecting lack of good, just as cold is the state of no heat, darkness is the state of no light, forgetfulness the lacking of memory, ignorance the lacking of knowledge. All of these are states of lacking and have no real existence.

Thus, evil does not exist and is relative to man. ʻAbdu'l-Bahá, son of the founder of the religion, in Some Answered Questions states:

Nevertheless, a doubt occurs to the mind—that is, scorpions and serpents are poisonous. Are they good or evil, for they are existing beings? Yes, a scorpion is evil in relation to man; a serpent is evil in relation to man; but in relation to themselves they are not evil, for their poison is their weapon, and by their sting they defend themselves.

Thus, evil is more of an intellectual concept than a true reality. Since God is good, and upon creating creation he confirmed it by saying it is Good (Genesis 1:31) evil cannot have a true reality.

==== Christianity ====
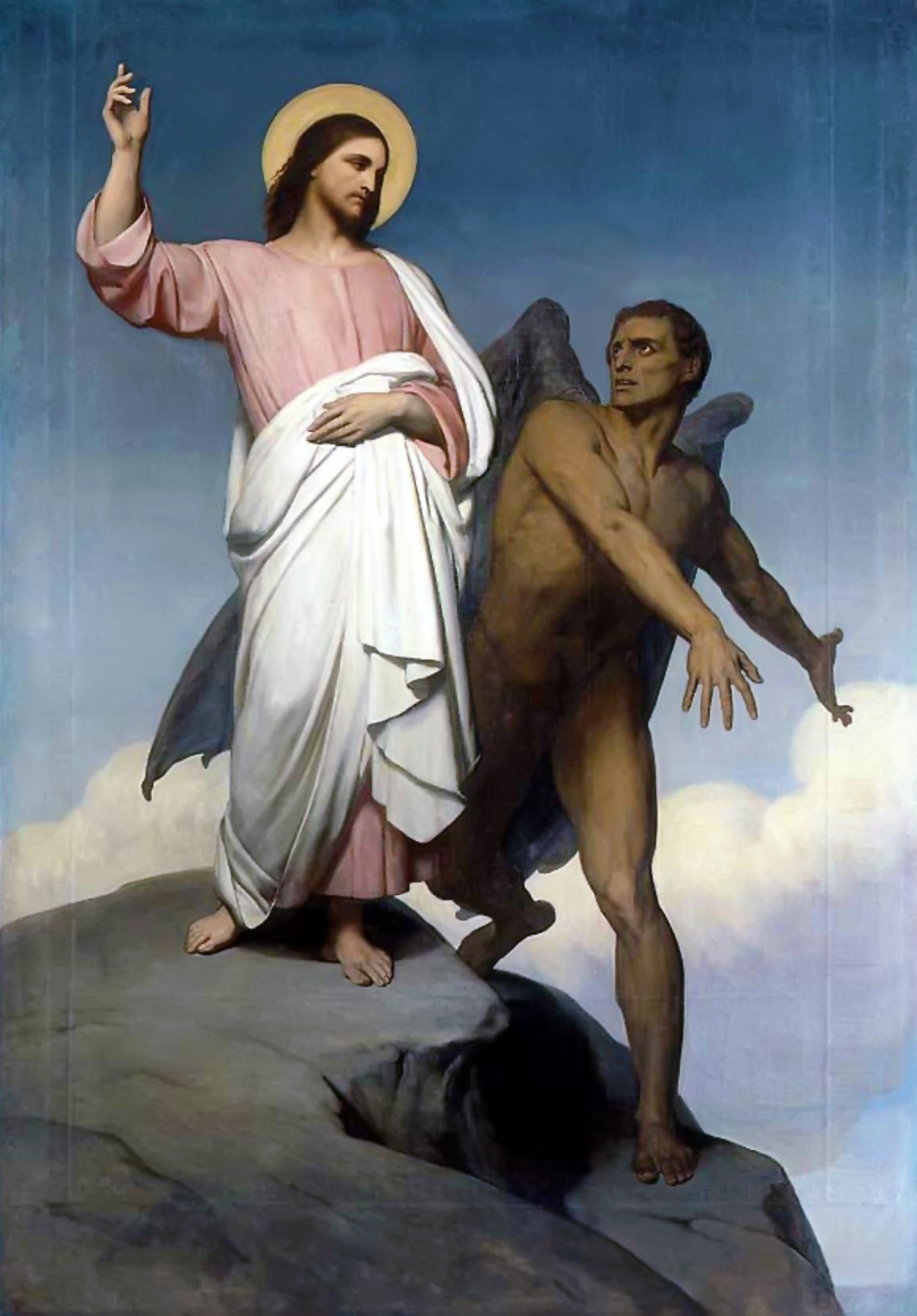
The devil, in opposition to the will of God, represents evil and tempts Christ, the personification of the character and will of God. Ary Scheffer, 1854.

Christian theology draws its concept of evil from the Old and New Testaments. The Christian Bible exercises "the dominant influence upon ideas about God and evil in the Western world." In the Old Testament, evil is understood to be an opposition to God as well as something unsuitable or inferior such as the leader of the fallen angels Satan. In the New Testament the Greek word poneros is used to indicate unsuitability, while kakos is used to refer to opposition to God in the human realm. Officially, the Catholic Church extracts its understanding of evil from its canonical antiquity and the Dominican theologian, Thomas Aquinas, who in Summa Theologica defines evil as the absence or privation of good. French-American theologian Henri Blocher describes evil, when viewed as a theological concept, as an "unjustifiable reality. In common parlance, evil is 'something' that occurs in the experience that ought not to be."

==== Islam ====
There is no concept of absolute evil in Islam, as a fundamental universal principle that is independent from and equal with good in a dualistic sense. Although the Quran mentions the biblical forbidden tree, it never refers to it as the 'tree of knowledge of good and evil'. Within Islam, it is considered essential to believe that all comes from God, whether it is perceived as good or bad by individuals; and things that are perceived as evil or bad are either natural events (natural disasters or illnesses) or caused by humanity's free will. Much more the behavior of beings with free will, then they disobey God's orders, harming others or putting themselves over God or others, is considered to be evil. Evil does not necessarily refer to evil as an ontological or moral category, but often to harm or as the intention and consequence of an action, but also to unlawful actions. Unproductive actions or those who do not produce benefits are also thought of as evil.

A typical understanding of evil is reflected by Al-Ash'ari, founder of Ash'arism. Accordingly, qualifying something as evil depends on the circumstances of the observer. An event or an action itself is neutral, but it receives its qualification by God. Since God is omnipotent and nothing can exist outside of God's power, God determines whether or not something is evil.

==== Rabbinic Judaism ====
In Judaism and Jewish theology, the existence of evil is presented as part of the idea of free will: if humans were created to be perfect, always and only doing good, being good would not mean much. For Jewish theology, it is important for humans to have the ability to choose the path of goodness, even in the face of temptation and yetzer hara (the inclination to do evil).

=== Ancient Egyptian ===
Evil in the religion of ancient Egypt is known as Isfet, "disorder/violence". It is the opposite of Maat, "order", and embodied by the serpent god Apep, who routinely attempts to kill the sun god Ra and is stopped by nearly every other deity. Isfet is not a primordial force, but the consequence of free will and an individual's struggle against the non-existence embodied by Apep, as evidenced by the fact that it was born from Ra's umbilical cord instead of being recorded in the religion's creation myths.

=== Indian ===
==== Buddhism ====
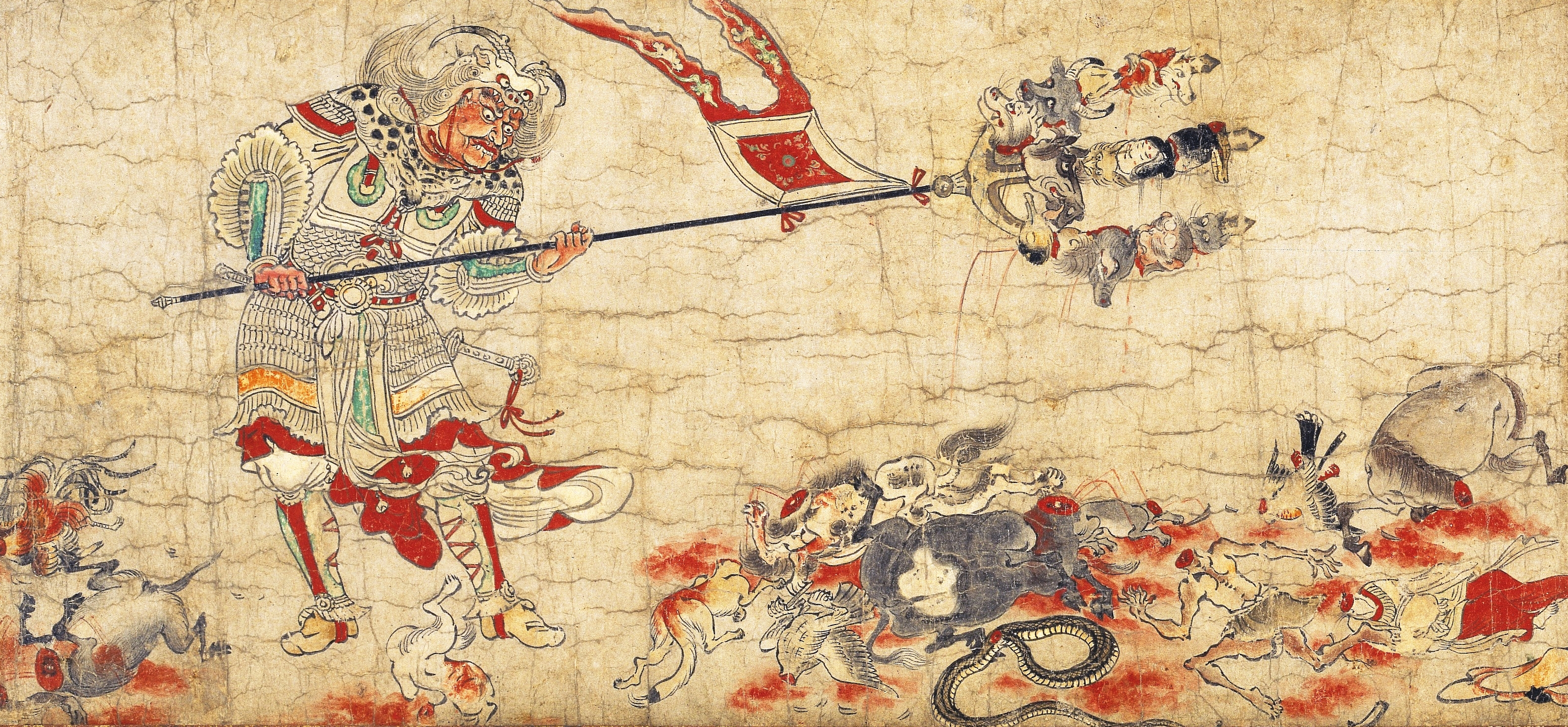
One of the five paintings of Extermination of Evil portrays one of the eight guardians of Buddhist law, Sendan Kendatsuba, banishing evil.

The primal duality in Buddhism is between suffering and enlightenment, so the good vs. evil splitting has no direct analogue in it. One may infer from the general teachings of the Buddha that the catalogued causes of suffering are what correspond in this belief system to 'evil'.

Practically this can refer to 1) the three selfish emotions—desire, hate and delusion; and 2) to their expression in physical and verbal actions. Specifically, evil means whatever harms or obstructs the causes for happiness in this life, a better rebirth, liberation from samsara, and the true and complete enlightenment of a buddha (samyaksambodhi).

"What is evil? Killing is evil, lying is evil, slandering is evil, abuse is evil, gossip is evil: envy is evil, hatred is evil, to cling to false doctrine is evil; all these things are evil. And what is the root of evil? Desire is the root of evil, illusion is the root of evil." Gautama Siddhartha, the founder of Buddhism, 563–483 BC.

==== Hinduism ====
In Hinduism, the concept of Dharma or righteousness clearly divides the world into good and evil, and clearly explains that wars have to be waged sometimes to establish and protect Dharma, this war is called Dharmayuddha. This division of good and evil is of major importance in both the Hindu epics of Ramayana and Mahabharata. The main emphasis in Hinduism is on bad action, rather than bad people. The Hindu holy text, the Bhagavad Gita, speaks of the balance of good and evil. When this balance goes off, divine incarnations come to help to restore this balance.

==== Sikhism ====
In adherence to the core principle of spiritual evolution, the Sikh idea of evil changes depending on one's position on the path to liberation. At the beginning stages of spiritual growth, good and evil may seem neatly separated. Once one's spirit evolves to the point where it sees most clearly, the idea of evil vanishes and the truth is revealed. Guru Arjan believes in his writings that, because God is the source of all things, what human beings believe to be evil must too come from God. And because God is ultimately a source of absolute good, nothing truly evil can originate from God.

Sikhism, like many other religions, does incorporate a list of "vices" from which suffering, corruption, and abject negativity arise. These are known as the Five Thieves, called such due to their propensity to cloud the mind and lead one astray from the prosecution of righteous action. These are:

- Moh, or Attachment
- Lobh, or Greed
- Karodh, or Wrath
- Kaam, or Lust
- Ahankar, or Egotism

One who gives in to the temptations of the Five Thieves is known as "Manmukh", or someone who lives selfishly and without virtue. Inversely, the "Gurmukh, who thrive in their reverence toward divine knowledge, rise above vice via the practice of the high virtues of Sikhism. These are:

- Sewa, or selfless service to others.
- Nam Simran, or meditation upon the divine name.

== Question of a universal definition ==
A fundamental question is whether there is a universal, transcendent definition of evil, or whether one's definition of evil is determined by one's social or cultural background. C. S. Lewis, in The Abolition of Man, maintained that there are certain acts that are universally considered evil, such as rape and murder. However, the rape of women, by men, is found in every society, and there are more societies that see at least some versions of it, such as marital rape or punitive rape, as normative than there are societies that see all rape as non-normative (a crime). In nearly all societies, killing except for defense or duty is seen as murder. Yet the definition of defense and duty varies from one society to another. Social deviance is not uniformly defined across different cultures, and is not, in all circumstances, necessarily an aspect of evil.

Defining evil is complicated by its multiple, often ambiguous, common usages: evil is used to describe the whole range of suffering, including that caused by nature, and it is also used to describe the full range of human immorality from the "evil of genocide to the evil of malicious gossip". It is sometimes thought of as the generic opposite of good. Marcus Singer asserts that these common connotations must be set aside as overgeneralized ideas that do not sufficiently describe the nature of evil.

In contemporary philosophy, there are two basic concepts of evil: a broad concept and a narrow concept. A broad concept defines evil simply as any and all pain and suffering: "any bad state of affairs, wrongful action, or character flaw". Yet, it is also asserted that evil cannot be correctly understood "(as some of the utilitarians once thought) [on] a simple hedonic scale on which pleasure appears as a plus, and pain as a minus". This is because pain is necessary for survival. Renowned orthopedist and missionary to lepers, Dr. Paul Brand explains that leprosy attacks the nerve cells that feel pain resulting in no more pain for the leper, which leads to ever increasing, often catastrophic, damage to the body of the leper. Congenital insensitivity to pain (CIP), also known as congenital analgesia, is a neurological disorder that prevents feeling pain. It "leads to ... bone fractures, multiple scars, osteomyelitis, joint deformities, and limb amputation ... Mental retardation is common. Death from hyperpyrexia occurs within the first 3 years of life in almost 20% of the patients." Few with the disorder are able to live into adulthood. Evil cannot be simply defined as all pain and its connected suffering because, as Marcus Singer says: "If something is really evil, it can't be necessary, and if it is really necessary, it can't be evil".

The narrow concept of evil involves moral condemnation, therefore it is ascribed only to moral agents and their actions. This eliminates natural disasters and animal suffering from consideration as evil: according to Claudia Card, "When not guided by moral agents, forces of nature are neither "goods" nor "evils". They just are. Their "agency" routinely produces consequences vital to some forms of life and lethal to others". The narrow definition of evil "picks out only the most morally despicable sorts of actions, characters, events, etc. Evil [in this sense] ... is the worst possible term of opprobrium imaginable". Eve Garrard suggests that evil describes "particularly horrifying kinds of action which we feel are to be contrasted with more ordinary kinds of wrongdoing, as when for example we might say 'that action wasn't just wrong, it was positively evil'. The implication is that there is a qualitative, and not merely quantitative, difference between evil acts and other wrongful ones; evil acts are not just very bad or wrongful acts, but rather ones possessing some specially horrific quality". In this context, the concept of evil is one element in a full nexus of moral concepts.

== Philosophical questions ==
=== Approaches ===
Views on the nature of evil belong to the branch of philosophy known as ethics—which in modern philosophy is subsumed into three major areas of study:

1. Meta-ethics, that seeks to understand the nature of ethical properties, statements, attitudes, and judgments.
2. Normative ethics, investigates the set of questions that arise when considering how one ought to act, morally speaking.
3. Applied ethics, concerned with the analysis of particular moral issues in private and public life.

=== Usefulness as a term ===
There is debate on how useful the term "evil" is, since it is often associated with spirits and the devil. Some see the term as useless because they say it lacks any real ability to explain what it names. There is also real danger of the harm that being labeled "evil" can do when used in moral, political, and legal contexts. Those who support the usefulness of the term say there is a secular view of evil that offers plausible analyses without reference to the supernatural. Garrard and Russell argue that evil is as useful an explanation as any moral concept. Garrard adds that evil actions result from a particular kind of motivation, such as taking pleasure in the suffering of others, and this distinctive motivation provides a partial explanation even if it does not provide a complete explanation. Most theorists agree use of the term evil can be harmful but disagree over what response that requires. Some argue it is "more dangerous to ignore evil than to try to understand it".

Those who support the usefulness of the term, such as Eve Garrard and David McNaughton, argue that the term evil "captures a distinct part of our moral phenomenology, specifically, 'collect[ing] together those wrongful actions to which we have ... a response of moral horror'". Claudia Card asserts that only by understanding the nature of evil can humans preserve humanitarian values and prevent evil in the future. If evils are the worst sorts of moral wrongs, social policy should focus limited energy and resources on reducing evil over other wrongs. Card asserts that by categorizing certain actions and practices as evil, humans are better able to recognize and guard against responding to evil with more evil which will "interrupt cycles of hostility generated by past evils".

One school of thought holds that no person is evil and that only acts may be properly considered evil. Some theorists define an evil action simply as a kind of action an evil person performs, but just as many theorists believe that an evil character is one who is inclined toward evil acts. Luke Russell argues that both evil actions and evil feelings are necessary to identify a person as evil, while Daniel Haybron argues that evil feelings and evil motivations are necessary.

American psychiatrist M. Scott Peck describes evil as a kind of personal "militant ignorance". According to Peck, an evil person is consistently self-deceiving, deceives others, psychologically projects his or her evil onto very specific targets, hates, abuses power, and lies incessantly. Evil people are unable to think from the viewpoint of their victim. Peck considers those he calls evil to be attempting to escape and hide from their own conscience (through self-deception) and views this as being quite distinct from the apparent absence of conscience evident in sociopaths. He also considers that certain institutions may be evil, using the My Lai massacre to illustrate. By this definition, acts of criminal and state terrorism would also be considered evil.

=== Necessity ===
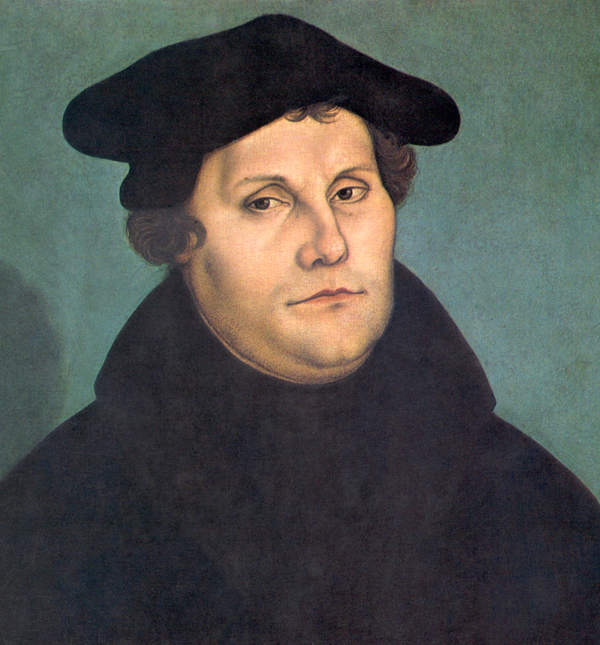
Martin Luther believed that occasional minor evil could have a positive effect.

Martin Luther argued that there are cases where a little evil is a positive good. He wrote, "Seek out the society of your boon companions, drink, play, talk bawdy, and amuse yourself. One must sometimes commit a sin out of hate and contempt for the Devil, so as not to give him the chance to make one scrupulous over mere nothings ..."

According to the "realist" schools of political philosophy, leaders should sometimes be able to switch from good to evil, taking actions based only upon advantage to the state; this approach to politics was put forth most famously by Niccolò Machiavelli, a 16th-century Florentine writer who advised princes that they should be willing to engage in political immorality to maintain their states. He also wrote that "one should not care about incurring the fame of those vices without which it is difficult to save one's state; for if one considers everything well, one will find something appears to be virtue, which if pursued would be one's ruin, and something else appears to be vice, which if pursued results in one's security and well-being."

== See also ==
- Banality of evil
- Moral evil
- Natural evil
- Ponerology
- Problem of evil
- Sin
- Theodicy
- Theodicy and the Bible
- Villain
- Wickedness
