= Haumai =

Egotistic self-centeredness concept of Sikhism

Haumai (Gurmukhi: ਹਉਮੈ, lit. 'I-me') is the concept of self-centeredness (egoism) in Sikhism which hinders humanity's spiritual development and cultivation. In Sikh theology, the phenomenon is believed to block the opening of the spiritual gateway, known as the dasam duar.

== Etymology ==
It is a combination of the words Hau (ਹਉ) meaning "I" and Mai (ਮੈ) meaning "me".

== Description ==
This concept was taught by Guru Nanak, the founder of Sikhism, as the source of five evils: lust, covetousness, wrath, pride and attachment. According to the Sikh gurus' teachings, it is Haumai that leads to endless cycles of transmigration (rebirth; samsara), and makes a person "manmukh". They state that one must turn away from Haumai, become a "gurmukh" and follow the path of the Guru to receive God's grace.

In Sikhism, the Haumai can only be overcome through meditation on God’s name (Naam), Simran and Sewa.

The opposite of Haumai is humility (or Nimrata), which is considered a virtue in Sikhism. Selfless service called Seva, and complete submission to Waheguru (God), is the Sikh path to liberation.

== Related concepts ==
The concept of destructive self-centeredness and covetous attachment, similar to Haumai in Sikhism, is important in other Indian religions. In Buddhism, Hinduism and Jainism, it is referred to as Ahankar (अहङ्कार), Ahammana (अहम्मान), Ahammati (अहम्मति), Mamatta (ममता) and Maminkāra.

=== Difference with Ahankar ===
The Sikh gurus make a distinction between Haumai and Ahankar in their hymns. Haumai is differentiated from Ahankaar as the latter is a product of the former. Haumai is placing trust in oneself rather than having faith in God. According James D. Holt, the difference is as follows: "Haumai is to do with the nature of a person's existence and their place within that, while ahankar is to explore a person's view of their own importance."

== See also ==
- Guru Granth Sahib
