= Five thugs =

Five personal qualities that inhibit spirituality in Sikhism

The five thugs (Gurmukhi: ਪੰਜੇ ਠਗ; Panj Thag), also known as the five cheats, are five negative, individual qualities that are believed in Sikhism to inhibit personal spiritual growth via Nām. Conquering them requires divine grace from the Sikh gurus as per the religion's teachings.

== Model ==
The five thugs consist of:

1. Power (raj)
2. Wealth (maal)
3. Beauty (roop)
4. Caste (jaat; or specifically high-caste)
5. Youth (joban)

The model is derived from the Raaj Maal Roop Jaath Jobun Punje Thug hymns authored by Guru Nanak, found on page 736 in Raag Malar. It can also be found on page 1288. The five thugs are the product of maya, being present in the society mankind has created over time. The five thugs are referenced much less when compared to the five thieves. Unlike the five thieves, the five thugs may seem deceptively helpful in life, which is how they entrap humanity. They render the human life useless by stealing spiritual capital of humans, thus they are termed thugs as they paralyze any spiritual potential of a human. Even being afflicted by one of the five thugs will inhibit spiritual progress. To overcome the five thugs, a person needs to be bestowed with discriminating intellect (Bibek Budhi) by the Sikh gurus, which is considered a rare gift. Faith has to be placed with the Sikh gurus and the shabad. Without divine grace, a human is relegated to living an egotistical, self-willed lifestyle, described as being a manmukh, consisting of desire (trishna), sin, vices, and wandering. without any chance of mukti and thus remaining ensnared in samsara. Wealth, power, and beauty are seen as fleeting in the grand scheme of existence, compared to a shadow or passing chariot, thus it is fruitless to chase them.

=== Raj ===
Raj (power) is acquired through nefarious means and corrupts the human soul. Those who have gained power become intoxicated and blinded by it, failing to recognize their precarious state and the evils they committed to reach their place. The desire for greater power leads a person to commit harmful and evil acts, often destroying their relationships with others in the process. Despite how powerful they may be, ultimately every creature will die and become dust.

=== Maal ===
Maal (wealth) refers to the possession of material goods and monetary value. Such holdings allows an individual to buy influence, even amongst the respected sections of society. They become greedy and indifferent to the suffering of those around them, such as the plight of the poor. Sikhism teaches that no matter how rich one may become or whatever methods they attempt to gain wealth, they will never acquire true and lasting contentment. It is connected to lobh.

=== Roop ===
Roop (beauty) is considered to lead a handsome man or beautiful woman to pride when others praise their appearance, gradually they begin to think of themselves as superior to others. It is compared to being rabid. As per gurbani, spending a lot of time on one's physical appearance is a waste. Furthermore, society's expectations of beauty cause one to feel unsatisfied with themselves despite nothing being inherently wrong. Roop is also linked to kaam (lust), as it evokes kaam in others.

=== Jaat ===
Jaat (caste) leads a person to feeling higher or lower than another by the nature of their birth or lineage alone, which Sikh theology chastises. Within the Indian subcontinent, discrimination based upon caste has persisted for thousands of years, leading to social harm. Formerly occupational categories became tied with lineage alone, being used as a system to oppress others and favour some. The Sikh gurus preached against the negativity of the caste system.

=== Joban ===
Joban (youth) refers to the carefree and risky nature of the young, who hurt or endangers themselves and others around them, which they often regret once they become older. They may also lack respect for others around them. According to Sikh teachings, the young need proper guidance through the Sikh gurus to transform them into a productive member of society and for them to mature. Negative influences can make a young person ruin themselves or the ones close to them.
