= God in Sikhism =

Sikh conception of God

The Sikh Symbol "Ik Onkar", often used to symbolize God in Sikhism

In Sikhism, God is conceived as the Oneness that permeates the entirety of creation and beyond. It abides within all of creation as symbolized by the symbol Ik Onkar. The One is indescribable yet knowable and perceivable to anyone who surrenders their egoism and meditates upon that Oneness. The Sikh gurus have described God in numerous ways in their hymns included in the Guru Granth Sahib, the holy scripture of Sikhism, but the oneness of formless God is consistently emphasized throughout.

God is described in the Mul Mantar (lit. the Prime Utterance), the first passage in the Guru Granth Sahib:

ੴ ਸਤਿ ਨਾਮੁ ਕਰਤਾ ਪੁਰਖੁ ਨਿਰਭਉ ਨਿਰਵੈਰੁ ਅਕਾਲ ਮੂਰਤਿ ਅਜੂਨੀ ਸੈਭੰ ਗੁਰ ਪ੍ਰਸਾਦਿ ॥
ikk ōankār sat(i)-nām(u) karatā purakh(u) nirabha'u niravair(u) akāla mūrat(i) ajūnī saibhan(g) gur(a) prasād(i).
There is only one God, and It is called the truth, It exists in all creation, and It has no fear, It does not hate, and It is timeless, universal and self-existent! You will come to know it through the grace of the Guru.

— Sri Guru Granth Sahib, page 1

== General conceptions ==
=== Monotheism ===
Sikhi is monotheistic and believes that there is only One God. Guru Nanak, the founder of Sikhi strongly denounces any type of Pakhand (hypocrisy or duality). Nanak prefixed the numeral "IK" (one) to the syllable Onkar to stress the idea of God's oneness; that the Creator, Preserver, and Destroyer is One. Sikh thought begins with the One Almighty and then universalising God, coming down to the cosmic reality of all-pervading creator. While God is described as without gender, God is also described through numerous metaphors, such as:

ਏਕੁ ਪਿਤਾ ਏਕਸ ਕੇ ਹਮ ਬਾਰਿਕ ਤੂ ਮੇਰਾ ਗੁਰ ਹਾਈ ॥

"Ek(u) pitaa ekas ke ham baarik"

"The One God is the Father of all;

We are His children."

— SGGS. Ang (limb) 611

There are verses of a monotheistic nature within the Sikh scripture, where God is described as being a "king of kings". Verses such as this can be interpreted in various ways.

=== Panentheism ===
Some scholars have defined Sikhism's conceptualization of God as a form of panentheism. God is seen as being greater than the creation but also permeates it whilst transcending beyond it while being eternal. Sikh teachings uses metaphors to narrate this belief, such as a fish being within an ocean where the water around it is godliness, whilst the fish does not lose its identity, or a lover merges as one within the beloved whilst still having a separate identity. Thus, the goal for a Sikh is to become one with this transcendent divinity. Sikhism is against incarnationism, thus it does not teach that the soul itself is exactly equivalent to god.

=== Pantheism ===
Another philosophy of Sikhism is the concept of Pantheism which says that every being is identical to Divinity. In the case of Sikhism, stories attributed to Guru Nanak suggest that he believed God was everywhere in the physical world, and the Sikh tradition typically describes God as the preservative force within the physical world, present in all material forms, each created as a manifestation of God. However, Sikhs view God as the transcendent creator, "immanent in the phenomenal reality of the world in the same way in which an artist can be said to be present in his art". This implies a more panentheistic position. It focuses on the subject of a non-anthropomorphic concept of God, to the extent that one can interpret God as the Universe itself. Sikh thought holds a pantheistic tone when it discusses the Immanence of God (Sagun), which says that the whole Universe is an abode of the All-pervasive Lord. However, Sikhism does not hold the concept of pantheism fully as it understands God to be both, transcendent and immanent at the same time. Sikh philosophy fuses the concepts of Theism and Pantheism as to the belief that God exists in His Creation to a Theistic level, that is the One upon whom everything depends; the ultimate Preserver.

It can be deduced that Sikhism agrees with Pantheistic belief only to the extent that Universe can be considered as Divine, never understating the Transcendence of God which deems the Creator as above His Creation.

=== Priority Monism ===
Sikhi complies with the concept of Priority Monism, a view point that all existing things go back to a Source that is distinct from them. It is the belief that all that our senses comprehend is illusion; God is the sole reality. Forms being subject to Time, shall pass away. God's Reality alone is eternal and abiding. The thought is such that Aatmaa (soul) is born from and a reflection of ParamAatma( Supreme Soul), and would again merge into it just as water merges back into the water, like a drop of water merging with the ocean.

ਜਿਉ ਜਲ ਮਹਿ ਜਲੁ ਆਇ ਖਟਾਨਾ ॥

Ji'u Jala Mahi Jala Ā'i Khaṭānā ||

As water comes to blend with water,

ਤਿਉ ਜੋਤੀ ਸੰਗਿ ਜੋਤਿ ਸਮਾਨਾ ॥

Ti'u Jōtī Saṅi Jōti Samānā ||

Their light blends into the Light.

— SGGS. Ang 278

God and Soul are identical in the same way as Fire and its sparks; fundamentally same as is stated in SatGuru Sri Guru Granth Sahib Ji, "Aatam meh Ram, Ram meh Aatam", which means "The Ultimate Eternal Lord is the soul and the soul is the Ultimate Eternal Lord". As from one stream, millions of waves arise and yet the waves, made of water, again become water; in the same way all souls have sprung from the Universal Being and would blend again into it. Guru Nanak referred to reality as being a "palace of smoke", highlighting Sikh theology's monistic inclination, where God is the true reality and everything else is illusion.

=== Qualified non-dualism ===
Sikh belief stresses that the Creator and the Creation are parts of the same overall whole.

=== Waheguru ===
There are frequent references to God in the perspective of all the various religions in the Guru Granth Sahib. The Guru Granth Sahib acknowledges perspectives of God in all religions. Guru Granth Sahib teaches that God is one almighty power.

== Specific conceptions ==
=== Great Architect ===
Sikh philosophy believes that the Oneness is the Great Architect of Universe. It alone is the Creator, Sustain-er, and Destroyer; Ek. God is Karta Purakh, the Creator-Being who created the spatial-temporal Universe from their own Self; the Universe is their own emanation. Guru Arjan advocates: “The One is true and true is Its creation [because] all has emanated from God Itself” (SGGS Ang294).

Before creation, God existed all alone as Nirgun (attributeless) in a state of Sunn Samadhi, deep meditation, as says Guru Nanak.

"There was darkness for countless years.

There was neither earth nor sky; there was only Its Will.

There was neither day nor night, neither sun nor moon.

They (God) were in deep meditation.

There was nothing except Itself."

— SGGS. Ang 1035

Then, God willed and created the Universe, and diffused Itself into the nature as Sargun (with attributes).

=== Creation ===
It is believed in Sikhi that the Universe was created by a single word of the God. Whilst the universe was created, a sound was produced as a result. The sound is noted in the first word in the Guru Granth Sahib – ੴ, Ik Oangkar. The syllable "Oang" is the sound that was created whilst the universe was created. The Transcendent God expressed themselves in "Naam" and "Sabad" that created the world. "Naam" and "Sabad" are the 'Creative and Dynamic Immanence of God'.

ਕੀਤਾ ਪਸਾਉ ਏਕੋ ਕਵਾਉ ॥

Keethaa Pasaao Eieko Kavaao ||

You created the vast expanse of the Universe with One Word!

ਤਿਸ ਤੇ ਹੋਏ ਲਖ ਦਰੀਆਉ ॥

This Thae Hoeae Lakh Dhareeaao ||

Hundreds of thousands of rivers began to flow.

— SGGS. Ang 3

=== Creation of the universe ===
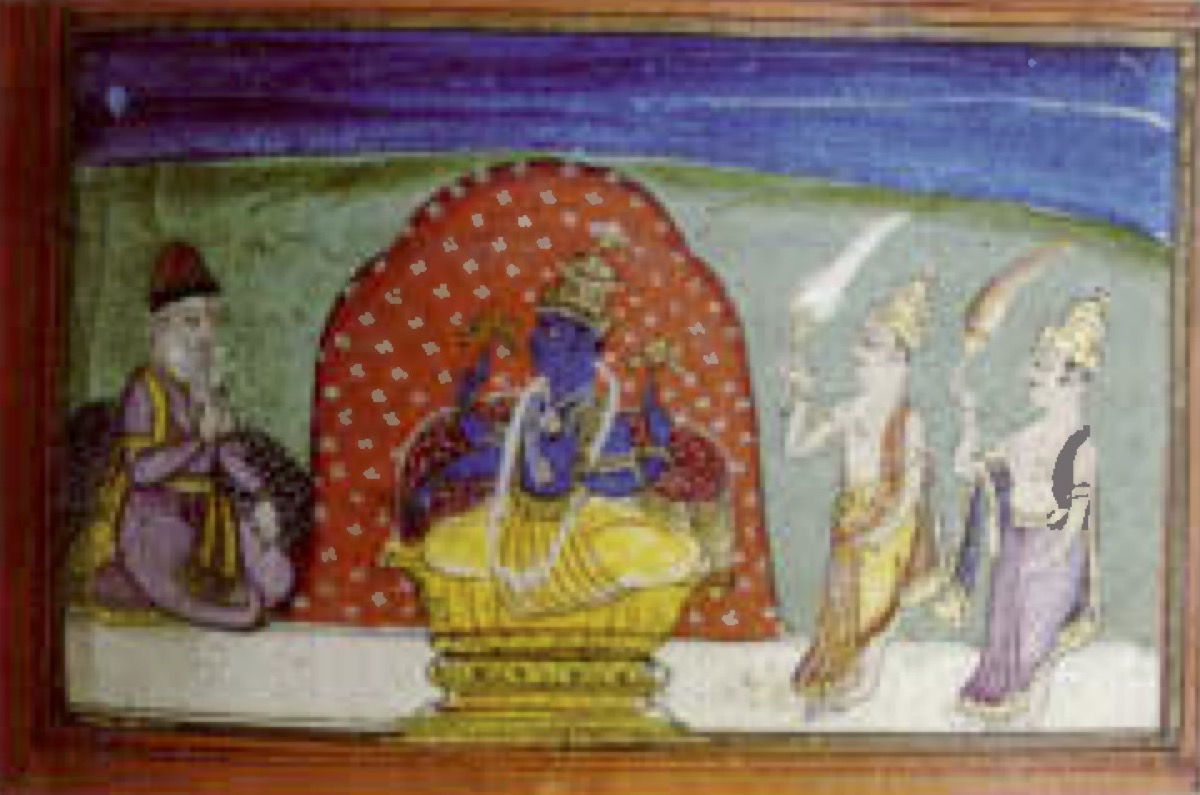
'Baba Nanak and Nirankara (formless reality, Waheguru, or the Supreme God)', early 19th century Janamsakhi painting from a Kashmiri manuscript

Sikh philosophy enunciates the belief that the limits of Time and Space are known only to God. Answers to the questions of "When did the Universe come into existence?" or "How big is this Universe?" are beyond human understanding. The best course, as Guru Nanak declares, is to admit a sense of wonderfulness or Vismad, since "the featureless Void was in ceaseless Existence". As to the Time of Creation, Nanak, in Jap(u) Sahib, recites that:

What was that time, and what was that moment? What was that day, and what was that date?

What was that season, and what was that month, when the Universe was created?

The Pandits, the religious scholars, cannot find that time, even if it is written in the Puranas.

That time is not known to the Qazis, who study the Koran.

The day and the date are not known to the Yogis, nor is the month or the season.

== Attributes ==
=== Eternalness ===
God, as stated in the Guru Granth Sahib, is Akal Murat, the Eternal Being;It is beyond time and ever the same. "Saibhan(g)", another attribute to God means that no one else but God created the creation. They are, shall be, was not born, and will not die; never created and hence, shall never be destroyed. The phrase "Ad(i) Sach", True in the Primal Beginning, in the Mool mantar proves the notion of the eternalness of God in Sikhi.

=== Transcendence and Immanence ===
Sikhi advocates a panentheistic tone when it enunciates the belief that God is both, transcendent and immanent, or "Nirgun" and "Sargun" (as stated in the Sikh terminology), at the same time. God created the Universe and permeates both within and without.

ਸਰਗੁਨ ਨਿਰਗੁਨ ਨਿਰੰਕਾਰ ਸੁੰਨ ਸਮਾਧੀ ਆਪਿ ॥

Saraguna Niraguna Niraṅkāra Sunna Samādhī Āpi ||

He possesses all qualities; He transcends all qualities;

He is the Formless Lord. He Himself is in Primal Samaadhi.

— SGGS. Sukhmani Sahib Ang 290

When it pleases God, them become Sarguna (Sanskrit Saguna = with attributes) and manifests Himself in creation. He becomes immanent in His created universe, which is His own emanation, an aspect of Himself.

=== Omnipotence ===
"God himself is the Creator and the Cause, the Doer and the Deed." Sikh thought is strictly monotheistic and believes that this Universe is creation of God. Its origins are in God, it operates under the Command of God (Hukam), and its end is in God; God is the Omnipotent being, the sole cause of Creation, Preservation, and Destruction. It consults none in creating and demolishing, giving and taking and does everything Itself. The Nirbhau (lit. Fearless) Almighty does not fear anyone and exercises Its unquestionable will.

=== Omnibenevolence ===
It is kind and merciful, the Omnibenevolent Lord. The Bestow-er of all things (Divanhaar); apart from It, there is no other Giver. It provides the body, the breath, food to Its creations. It is also a great Pardoner; pardoning all our mistakes, they bestows Virtue on the repenting souls and adds Blessedness on the striving virtuous. The Almighty sustains His Creation compassionately and benevolently. In SatGuru Granth, God is called as "Kareem" (Merciful); the complacent Lord who, in Its compassion, blesses the miserable with Its Nadar (graceful vision). The Nirvair (lit. without enmity/hatred) God does not hate anyone and glances their merciful vision on every being, indifferently. All are one Its view.

"The Lord is kind and compassionate to all beings and creatures; His Protecting Hand is over all." (SGGS. Ang 300)

=== Gender ===
According to Sikhi, God has "No" Gender. Irrespective of the native-language meaning of the Mantra, the standard English translation neutralises the implied Gender of God in Sikhism. The scripture of Sikhism is the Gurū Granth (GG). Printed as a heading for the Guru Granth, and for each of its major divisions, is the Mul Mantra, a short summary description of God, in Punjabi. Sikh tradition has it that this was originally composed by Guru Nanak Dev (1469–1539), the founder of Sikhism.

Punjabi: ੴ ਸਤਿ ਨਾਮੁ ਕਰਤਾ ਪੁਰਖੁ ਨਿਰਭਉ ਨਿਰਵੈਰੁ ਅਕਾਲ ਮੂਰਤਿ ਅਜੂਨੀ ਸੈਭੰ ਗੁਰ ਪ੍ਰਸਾਦਿ ॥
ISO 15919: Ika ōaṅkāra sati nāmu karatā purakhu nirabha'u niravairu akāla mūrati ajūnī saibhaṃ gura prasādi.
English: One Universal God, The Name Is Truth, The Creator, Fearless, Without Hatred, Image Of The Timeless One, Beyond Birth, Self-Existent, By Guru's Grace.
According to Sikhi, God has "No" Gender. Mool Mantar describes God as being "Ajuni" (lit. not in any incarnations) which implies that God is not bound to any physical forms. This concludes: the All-pervading Lord is Gender-less.

Mool Mantar describes God as being "Ajuni" (lit. not in any incarnations) which implies that God is not bound to any physical forms. This concludes: the All-pervading Lord is Gender-less.

ਸੁੰਨ ਮੰਡਲ ਇਕੁ ਜੋਗੀ ਬੈਸੇ ॥ ਨਾਰਿ ਨ ਪੁਰਖੁ ਕਹਹੁ ਕੋਊ ਕੈਸੇ ॥ ਤ੍ਰਿਭਵਣ ਜੋਤਿ ਰਹੇ ਲਿਵ ਲਾਈ ॥ ਸੁਰਿ ਨਰ ਨਾਥ ਸਚੇ ਸਰਣਾਈ ॥

Sunna maṇḍala iku Jogī baise. Nāra na purakhu kahahu ko'ū kaise. Tribhavaṇ joti rahe liva lā'ī. Suri nara nātha sace saraṇā'ī

The Yogi, the Primal Lord, sits in the Realm of Absolute Stillness (state free of mind's wanderings or Phurne). (Since God) is neither male nor female; how can anyone describe Him? The three worlds center their attention on His Light. The godly beings and the Yogic masters seek the Sanctuary of this True Lord.

— SGGS. Ang 685

However, the Guru Granth Sahib consistently refers to God as "He" and "Father" (with some exceptions), typically because the Guru Granth Sahib was written in north Indian Indo-Aryan languages (mixture of Punjabi and Sant Bhasha, Sanskrit with influences of Persian) which have no neutral gender. English translations of the teachings may eliminate any gender specifications. From further insights into the Sikh philosophy, it can be deduced that God is, sometimes, referred to as the Husband to the soul-brides, in order to make a patriarchal society understand what the relationship with God is like. Also, God is considered to be our Father, Mother, and Companion.

The sixth word of the mantra, purakhu, is the Punjabi form of Sanskrit puruṣa (पुरुष), meaning man (personal and male). Verse 5 of a 16-verse hymn in the 10th mandala (or cycle) of the Sanskrit Rigveda (RV) called puruṣa sūkta, speaks of a primal man, Puruṣa, from whom Viraj (woman) was born, being himself then reborn of her.

- From him Viraj was born; again Purusa from Viraj was born.

The masculine gender sense of purakhu in the Mantra is found in a verse like the following.

- That house, in which the soul-bride has married her Husband Lord—in that house, O my companions, sing the songs of rejoicing.
- You are the Husband Lord, and I am the soul-bride.

In Sikhism, a person has two genders – one the physical gender i.e. sex (male or female), and the other the spiritual gender (which is always female – regardless of a person's physical sex). Waheguru is alluded culturally as the spiritual husband, reunion with Which is the desire of every spiritual bride – all of us.

- In attachment to Maya, they have forgotten the Father, the Cherisher of the World.
- You are our Self-sufficient Father. || 2 || O Father, I do not know—how can I know Your Way?
- You are the Universal Father of all, O my Lord and Master.

Some references are inclusive, where God is both Mother and Father.

- The One is my Brother, the One is my Friend. The One is my Mother and Father. The One is the Support of the mind; He has given us body and soul. May I never forget God from my mind; He holds all in the Power of His Hands.
- Relying on Your Mercy, Dear Lord, I have indulged in sensual pleasures. Like a foolish child, I have made mistakes. O Lord, You are my Father and Mother.

There is at least one reference to God as Mother, without reference to a Father.

- "O my wandering mind, you are like a camel – how will you meet the Lord, your Mother?"

This overly literal interpretation of the cultural references in the Guru Granth Sahib run counter to the basic premise of the Mul Mantar – that God has no form. Hence, an anthropomorphic religious (as opposed to cultural) interpretation is a contradiction in terms. The inherent anti-anthropomorphism of Sikhism scuttles any idea of religious gender of Waheguru. The God in Sikhism is considered as Jot Saroop (Luminescence Light) so no question of gender but depending upon the feeling of the devotee God can turn Itself to any shape a child (girl or boy), a young man or woman, old man or woman or whatever It desire to be i.e. It is not governed by any law or rule and It is free to do anything. So in Sikhism, God is considered to be without form or gender and can't be described.

=== Names for God ===
Sikhi greatly emphasizes the name of God. The Adi Granth emphasizes Naam, the name of the God as through meditating on the Naam, one can meet God, opening up ones tenth spiritual gate and experience 'Anand' indescribable bliss. Sikhi believes in Monotheism. God has been called by many Attributive names [action-related names, Kirtan Naam (SGGS. Ang 1083), or Karam Naam (Dasam Granth, Jaap Sahib) in Sikh literature, picked from Indian and Semitic traditions.

They are called in terms of human relations as our Father, Mother, Brother, Companion, Friend, Lover, Beloved, and Husband.

Other names, expressive of His supremacy are Thakur (lit. Lord), Prabhu (lit. God), Swami, Shah (lit. King), Paatshah (lit. Master King), Sahib, Allah (God), Khuda (Persian word for Allah), Rahim, Karim, Sain (Lord, Master).

God has also been referred to, in Sikh literature as Hari, Sridhar, Kamla-pati, SriRang, Vishwambhar, Krishna, Saringdhar, ParaBrahma, Paramatma, Pyara, Nath, GopiNath, Jagannath, ChakraPan, Ram, Narayan, Govind, Gopal and many more.

Though these names are mentioned in the Guru Granth Sahib. Sikhs are ordered by the Gurus to meditate by chanting Waheguru, the Name of God, to meet God and experience 'Anand', which Bhai Gurdas states in his Varan to signify, Wah (Praise) Hey (you) Guru (God).

Other attributive names include Nirankar (Formless), Niranjan (without sin), Data or Datar (lit. The Giver), Karta or Kartar (lit. The Doer), Dayal (Compassionate), Kripal (Benevolent) and many more.

Names peculiar to Sikhism for God are Naam (lit. name), Shabad (word) and Waheguru (Wow true Master). While Naam and Shabad are mystical terms standing for the Divine Manifestation, Waheyguru is a phrase expressing awe, wonder, and ecstatic joy of the worshiper as he/she comprehends the greatness and grandeur of the Lord and their Creation.

== Beliefs ==
=== Reincarnation ===
The center belief of Sikh thought is the soul would reincarnate in this universe unless it attains the state of mukti (liberation), which is to be achieved through the grace of God. In its corporeal attire, the soul passes through cycles of transmigration. Through Divine Grace and ones actions, it can merge back into the Absolute Soul (Paramatma) and escape the throes of birth and death again and again.

=== Revelation ===
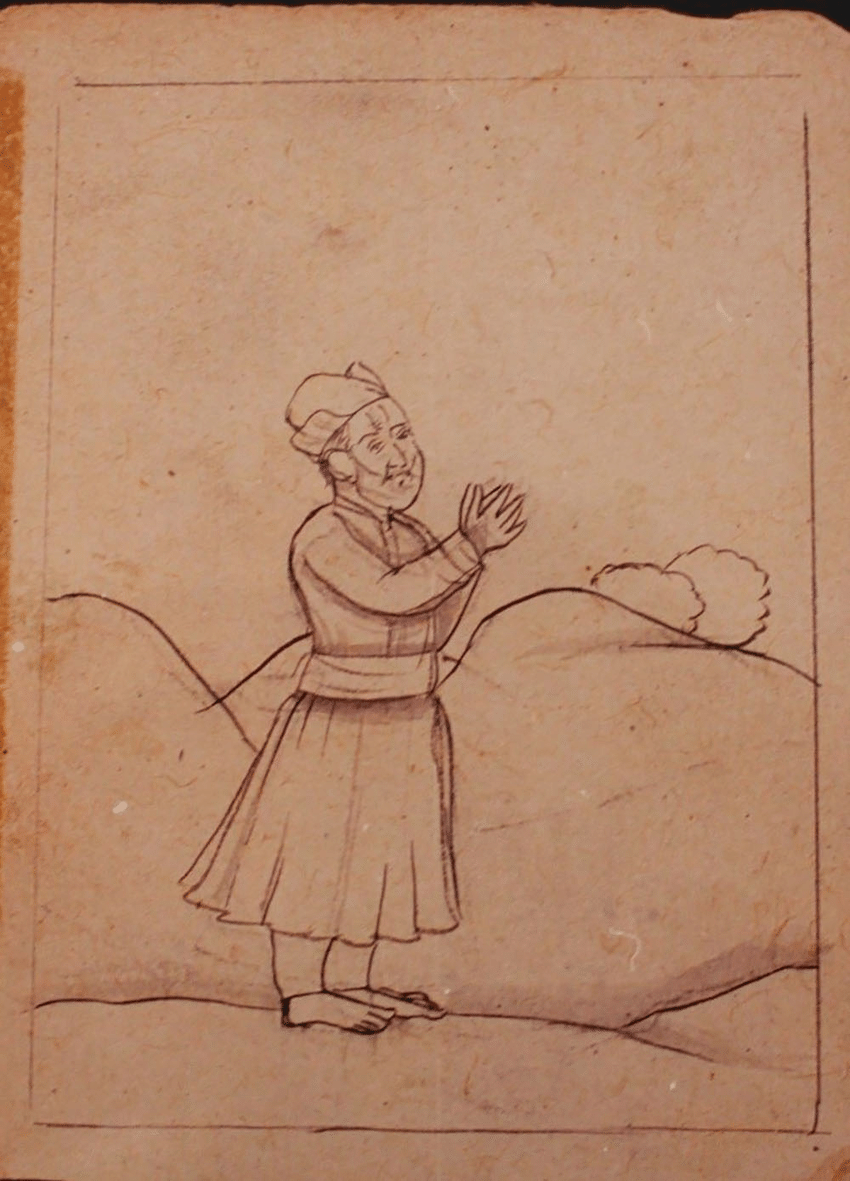
A Scene of Revelation. From the Guler set of Janam-sakhi painting. Attributed to the Seu-Nainsukh workshop. Pahari. Last quarter of the eighteenth century

The Mool Mantar ends with Gurparsad(i) (lit. by God's Grace), which expresses the belief of Sikh thought that God would be revealed to the Soul through SatGuru's grace. In Sikh theology SatGuru appears in three different but allied connotations, viz. God, the ten Sikh gurus, and the gur-shabad as preserved in the Guru Granth Sahib.

"Blessing us with His Grace, the Kind and Compassionate All-powerful Lord comes to dwell within the mind and body. (SGGS. Ang 49)"

Knowledge of the ultimate Reality is not a matter for reason; it comes by revelation of the ultimate reality through nadar (grace) and by anubhava (mystical experience). Guru Nanak says, budhi pathi na paiai bahu chaturaiai bhai milai mani bhane which translates to "He is not accessible through intellect, or through mere scholarship or cleverness at argument; He is met, when He pleases, through devotion" (SGGS, Ang 436).

=== Mysticism ===
Mysticism is the experience of becoming one with The Almighty, which Guru Nanak states as Sach-Khand (Realm of Truth), where the soul is immersed completely in the Divine Will. The primal belief of Sikhism is of the Spirit to get merged into the Divinity. The Guru Granth Sahib proclaims human incarnation as a chance to meet God and to enter into the Mystic Reality.

ਭਈ ਪਰਾਪਤਿ ਮਾਨੁਖ ਦੇਹੁਰੀਆ ॥

भई परापति मानुख देहुरीआ ॥

Bẖa▫ī parāpaṯ mānukẖ ḏehurī▫ā.

This human body has been given to you.

ਗੋਬਿੰਦ ਮਿਲਣ ਕੀ ਇਹ ਤੇਰੀ ਬਰੀਆ ॥

गोबिंद मिलण की इह तेरी बरीआ ॥

Gobinḏ milaṇ kī ih ṯerī barī▫ā.

This is your chance to meet the Lord of the Universe.

— SGGS. Ang 12

It is a devoted meditation (simran) that enables a sort of communication between the Infinite and finite human consciousness. There is, chiefly, the remembrance of God through the recitation of their name and surrendering of the self to God's presence, often metaphorized as surrendering one's self to the Lord's feet. The ultimate destination of a Sikh is to lose his egoism completely in the love of the Lord and finally merge into him.

== Practices ==
=== Five Vices ===
Those, who follow the instincts of their mind, under the influence of the five vices – lust, anger, greed, attachment, and pride – and ego will wander miserably in the cycle of birth and rebirth. They are known as Manmukhs.

1. Kaam (Lust)
2. Krodh (Wrath)
3. Ahankar (Ego)
4. Lobh (Greed)
5. Moh (Attachment)

=== Three Duties ===
1. Naam Japo (Meditating via Chanting God's Name)
2. Kirat Karo (Honestly work to earn livelihood)
3. Vand Chhako (Share what you have with the needy)

== See also ==
- Conceptions of God
- God
- Existence of God
- Names of God
- Jaap Sahib
- Waheguru

== Bibliography ==
- Sabadarth Sri Guru Granthsar, 1959
- Jodh Singh, Bhai, Gurmati Nirnaya. Amritsar, 1932
- Pritam Singh, ed., Sikh Phalsaphe di Rup Rekhla. Amritsar, 1975
- Sher Singh, The Philosophy of Sikhism. Lahore, 1944
- Kapur Singh, Parasaraprasna. Amritsar, 1989
