= Ponerology =

Study of evil in relation to God

In theology, ponerology (from Greek πονηρός ponērós, "evil") is the study of evil. Major subdivisions of the study are the nature of evil, the origin of evil, and evil in relation to the Divine Government.

Karl Immanuel Nitzsch outlined his System der christlichen Lehre (System of Christian Doctrine) into three major rubrics:

- Agathology or the Doctrine of the Good
- Ponerology, or the Doctrine of the Bad
- Soteriology, or the Doctrine of Salvation

He further subdivided ponerology into the topics of Sin and of Death.

The concept of political ponerology was popularized by Polish psychiatrist Andrzej Łobaczewski, who advocated using the fields of psychology, sociology, philosophy, and history to account for such phenomena as aggressive war, ethnic cleansing, genocide, and despotism.

== See also ==
- Problem of evil
- Theodicy
