= Hankaar =

Ego, one of the five evils in Sikhism

Five Evils

1. Kam (Lust) 2. Krodh (Rage) 3. Lobh (Greed) 4. Moh (Attachment) 5. Ahankar (Ego)

Ahankar, commonly rendered as Hankaar or Hankār (Punjabi: ਹੰਕਾਰ, pronunciation: [ɦaunkäːaɝ]) based upon its pronunciation in Punjabi, is a Gurmukhi word originating from the Sanskrit word Ahankāra (Sanskrit: अहंकार) which translates to mean "ego" or "excessive pride" due to one's possessions, material wealth, spirituality, beauty, talents, physical strength, intelligence, authoritative powers, charity work, amid others. It is one of the five thieves of Sikhism which hinder one's spiritual's progression.

== Etymology ==
The term is a compound word derived from the Sanskrit words aham ('I') and kar ('maker'), therefore it literally means "I-maker", referring to the thing which creates the formation of a conception of a separate "I" in one's mind.

== Terms ==
Various synonymous terms appear in the Sikh scriptures to describe the state of mind aside from ahankar, such as mān, abhimān, garab, gumān, ahaṅg, ahammeu, ahambudh, haumai and khudī.

== Translation ==
William Owen Cole recounts that an appropriate translation of the term is difficult to render into English. It is most commonly translated as "pride" or "ego" whether or not these serve as suitable translations continues to be debated by scholars within Sikh studies.

== Description ==
Harbans Singh describes the evil as follows:

Ahankar is vanity, elation or exultation arising from an exaggerated view of one's own merit. The merit may consist in real or presumed intellect, scholarship, physical strength or beauty, worldly rank and possessions or even spiritual accomplishments.

— Harbans Singh, The Encyclopedia of Sikhism, Volume I, 4th edition (2002), page 19

Rather than being seen as a source of individual strength, as pride is commonly perceived, Sikhism views it as an immense source of personal weakness.

Sikhism requires that a person serves society and community with Nimrata or humility. This is obtained by Sewa and hence, one sees the practice of devotees cleaning the footwear of visitors to a Gurdwara so that the mind of devout Sikh is made more humble.

This Cardinal Evil is often regarded by Sikhs as the worst of the Five Evils. They feel that pride leads to Haumai because it makes people believe that they are the most important thing in life and leads to self-centredness.

The Sikh gurus condemn individuals with overinflated pride as the human body is impermanent and everyone will die one day. As per Sikhism, only God and spiritual saints have virtues worthy of praise, not misguided individuals far from the path.

It is important to make a distinction between healthy levels of self-respect and a sense of honour based upon good judgement, from ahankar. Self-respect and a sense of honour with pure intentions is not incongruous with humility (nimrata). Guru Nanak offers the following reassurance: "If one loseth one's honour, all that he eats is unclean." (Guru Granth Sahib, 142)

Ahankar is an enemy of the potential equality of mankind as it begets one to think highly of oneself and view others as inferior to them. Pride leads one to forget that everything they have is a gift from Waheguru, instead the sinner views themself as the cause for their success rather than God. From Ahankar, the other evils, kaam, krodh, lobh, and moh arise out of, since every single one of them is based upon how an individual is influenced or pleased by life. Thus, ahankar is the worst of all the five thieves as it begets the rest of them.

=== Analysis provided by the Sikh gurus ===
Guru Amar Das states the following on its effect upon the individual:

... it is a deadly disease and the cause of the unending cycle of birth, death and re-birth

— Guru Amar Das, Guru Granth Sahib, page 592

Thus, it works as an agent which binds the soul into the cycle of birth and death (samsara), keeping them away from spiritual liberation (mukti).

Moreover, Guru Amar Das also states the following, which links the formation of the evil trait to lobh (greed):

Pelf is like poison, for it engenders arrogance. None sunk in arrogance wins approval

— Guru Amar Das, Guru Granth Sahib, page 666

In its relation to God realization, it impedes upon one's journey to it, such as through the practice of Naam Simran:

Egoity is the adversary of nam (absorption in God's Name); the two cannot abide together

— Guru Amar Das, Guru Granth Sahib, page 560

Guru Arjan provides a detailed description of the harmful effects of ahankar on humanity:

O thou, the cause of birth and death: O thou, the soul of sin: Thou forsakest friends and sowest enmities: Thou spreadest the net of illusion far and wide

— Guru Arjan, Guru Granth Sahib, page 1358

Guru Tegh Bahadur states that even a person who has reached a high level of spiritual advancement can render all their efforts fruitless if they allow ahankar to ensnare them:

Pilgrimages, fasting and charities if they lead to guman (pride) go waste like the bath by an elephant (who after bathing besmears his body with dirt)

— Guru Tegh Bahadur, Guru Granth Sahib, page 1428

=== Solution ===
The remedy for ahankar as per Sikhism is the cultivation of humility (nimrata) and the practice of voluntary sevā. Seva and nimrata are seen as correlative to one another. One develops humility through the selfless service of others.

Another method of dealing with ahankar is self-awareness of the vast expanse of creation and how tiny we are human beings are in-comparison to the boundless cosmos. Human beings live their lives in an infinitesimally small blink of time in the grand scheme of the Universe.

Bhagat Kabir states the following on the narcissism of pride when humans live short, impermanent existences no matter what status they thought they held on Earth:

Even kings mightier than Ravana ... perished in a twinkle

— Kabir, Guru Granth Sahib, page 1251

=== Difference with Haumai ===
The Sikh gurus make a distinction between Haumai and Ahankar in their hymns. Haumai, another Sikh term with a similar understood meaning (self-centredness), is differentiated from Ahankaar as the latter is a product of the former. Haumai is placing trust in oneself rather than having faith in God. According James D. Holt, the difference is as follows: "Haumai is to do with the nature of a person's existence and their place within that, while ahankar is to explore a person's view of their own importance."

=== Difference in conceptualization from other Indic traditions ===
Whilst Samkhya, Buddhist, and other Indian philosophies treat ahamkara as a metaphysical construction, Sikhism, on the other hand, describes it as a common evil trait, among five, inherent within human beings.

== Scriptural excerpts ==
The following Shabads from Gurbani clarify this cardinal vice:

- The world is drunk, engrossed in sexual desire, anger and egotism. (Guru Granth Sahib Page 51 line 2070)
- Renounce sexual desire, anger, falsehood and slander;
  forsake Maya and eliminate egotistical pride. (Guru Granth Sahib Page 141 line 5766)
- The duality of Maya dwells in the consciousness of the people of the world. They are destroyed by sexual desire, anger and egotism. ((1)) (Guru Granth Sahib Page 223 line 9561)
- They complain about other peoples' faults, while their own self-conceit only increases. (Guru Granth Sahib Page 366 line 16693)
- In the Saadh Sangat, the Company of the Holy, redeem your mind, and adore the Lord, twenty-four hours a day. Sexual desire, anger and egotism will be dispelled, and all troubles shall end. ((2)) (Guru Granth Sahib Page 501 line 22390)
