= Five thieves =

Major vices in Sikhism

In Sikhism, the Five Thieves (Punjabi: ਪੰਜ ਚੋਰ, pronunciation: [pand͡ʒ t͡ʃoɝ]), also called the five evils, five evil impulses, or the five vices (Punjabi: ਪੰਜ ਬੁਰਾਈਆਂ paja burā'ī'āṁ), are the five major weaknesses of the human personality at variance with its spiritual essence, and are known as "thieves" because they steal a person's inherent common sense. These five thieves are kaam (lust), krodh (wrath), lobh (greed), moh (attachment) and ahankar (ego or excessive pride).

Haumai ('I', 'me', 'mine', i.e., self-centredness) is traditionally said to be the source of these five evil impulses.

== See also ==
- Six Enemies (Hinduism)
- Kashaya (Jainism)
- Kleshas (Buddhism)
- Five hindrances (Buddhism)
- Seven deadly sins
- Three poisons
