= Nāma =

Sanskrit for "name"

Nāma is Sanskrit for name. In this context its meaning is the creative power. Alternate meanings in the Guru Granth Sahib include shabda (word), kirtan (melody). In Sikhism, 'nām simran' is a meditative practice, which means "remember" or "hold in mind" (simran) the divine name (nām) of God.

In Arabic it is kalam (kalam meaning "pen") "a" indicates something that's written by pen, in Chinese it means Tao. Simran means repetition of, or meditation on, the name of the divine and is the principal method or tool which is meant to unite the soul with the Paramatman, Allah, or God.

== See also ==
- Dhikr
- Ik Onkar
- Jaap Sahib
- Japa
- Nām Japō
- Namarupa
- Names of God
- Nembutsu
- Om
- Shabda
- Simran
- Universal Sufism
- Vedic chant
