= Moh =

One of the Five Evils of Sikhism

Five Evils

1. Kam (Lust) 2. Krodh (Rage) 3. Lobh (Greed) 4. Moh (Attachment) 5. Ahankar (Ego)

Moh (Punjabi: ਮੋਹ mōha; Sanskrit: muh) is a word in Punjabi and Sanskrit which describes attachment to worldly possessions or individuals. It is one of the five thieves within Sikh philosophy which hinder one's spiritual development.

== Definition ==
The term has been translated by The Encyclopaedia of Sikhism as meaning: “to become stupefied, to be bewildered or perplexed, to err, to be mistaken”. It is defined in ancient Indic texts for perplexity or confusion and for the cause of confusion, that namely being, avidya or ajnana (ignorance or illusion).

It is called aaskti "आसक्ति" in Hindi, which is considered a root cause for राग द्वेष "all the sorrows in life". In Hindu religious texts it is a cause of ignorance अज्ञान which is due to worldly illusion माया (maya).

In another context, it stands for “the snare of worldly illusion, infatuation.” Its purpose has two elements: it obscures the discernment of truth, prevents the perception of reality, and it creates an error of judgement or leads to wrong knowledge (mithya jnana). Humans believe in an eternal reality of their own existence or ego; they see truth in what is false and seek happiness in what brings suffering.

In Punjabi moh generally means love of and attachment to worldly things and relations.

== Description ==
In Sikh scripture, the term frequently occurs coupled with maya (maia) as maya-moh interpreted both as infatuation for or clinging to the illusory world of the senses and as the illusion of worldly love and attachment. Sikh interpretation of maya, however, differs from that of classical, Advaita philosophy, which considers the phenomenal world unreal and therefore an illusion caused by human ignorance.

In Sikhism, the visible world is a manifestation of God and is therefore real; yet it is not satya or true in the sense of immutable and eternal. This world of mass, form and movement woven into the warp and weft of time and space is God's play created at His pleasure and is as such real and sacred; but it represents only one transient aspect and not Ultimate Reality. Maya is not an illusion in the sense of a mirage, a factual nullity; it is a delusion which represents transient as permanent and a part as the whole.

Moh for maya, i.e. for this transient world of the senses, hinders the soul's search for its ultimate goal and is, therefore, one of the Five Evils. It is related, on the one hand, to kam (desire, love) and lobh (possessiveness, covetousness) and, on the other, to ahankar (sense of I, my and mine). That is how moh has been referred to as a net, maiajal. Guru Nanak advises shedding of moh as it is the source of all evil and a cause for repeated births and deaths.

Moh prevents the union of the human soul with the Divine, such a state of spiritual union is known as Sehaj.

=== Solution ===
The antidote to moh is non-attachment (vairāg). This is not easy, for the Gurus preach active participation in life rather than renunciation and escapism. Ultimately, all depends on nadar or God's grace. Says Guru Nanak “nadari kare ta ehu mohu jai—by (His) grace alone will this moh be cancelled”. The right remedy is the understanding (gian) that the mundane world, its relations and affairs, demanding one's participation and involvement are transient. Non-attachment thus is not non-action, but an attitude to action characterized by Guru Nanak as that of a bajigar, participant in a sport. The world, says Guru Nanak in a hymn in Maru measure, “is like a seasonal pastureland where one passeth but a few days. . . Like the bajigar one plays one’s part here and departs”.

A common and repeating theme in gurbani describing the ideal life is that of the lotus which, although living in water, keeps its head above it without allowing itself to be submerged. The symbolism of the lotus is repeated throughout the hymns of the Gurus as a state to aspire to in-order to keep away the ill-effects of Moh upon the spiritual seeker.
