= Lobh =

One of the Five Evils in Sikhism

Five Evils

1. Kam (Lust) 2. Krodh (Rage) 3. Lobh (Greed) 4. Moh (Attachment) 5. Ahankar (Ego)

Lobh (Gurmukhi: ਲੋਭ Lōbha) is a word derived from the Sanskrit (लोभ), which translates in English to "greed"; it is a strong desire for worldly possessions and a constant focus on possessing material items, especially the urge to possess what rightfully belongs to others. It is one of the Five Evils of Sikhism that hinder one's spiritual progression. An individual suffering from the evil is known as a Lobhi. It is linked to maal, one of the five thugs.

== Translation ==
Whilst most commonly translated to "greed", Harbans Singh has also rendered translating the term to avarice, covetousness or cupidity.

== Description ==
It is an inherent instinct of mankind that Sikhism denounces to the fullest extent when it arises and keeps one away from spiritual advancement. It is also seen as hindering moral improvement.

O lobh, you have lured the best of men who gambol about under your sway. Their minds waver and run in all directions. You have respect neither for friend nor for one worthy of adoration, neither for father, mother or kindred. You make one do what one must not do ..."

— Guru Amar Das, Guru Granth Sahib, page 1358, The Encyclopedia of Sikhism (Vol. 2: E–L) by Harbans Singh

Lobh is related and linked to kaam, another of the five thieves. Whilst lobh is a disproportionately large desire or covetousness for material things, kaam, on the other hand is the extreme desire for sexual things. An individual's lobh commonly comes at the cost of another person.

According to Sikhism, it makes an individual selfish and self-centered. It takes a person away from their religious and social duties. They become obsessed with acquiring wealth or money, whether through honest or immoral ways. A person can become blind with greed in an effort to control the desire for unlimited worldly possessions.

Sikhs do not believe that it is wrong to enjoy the good things in life, to be wealthy or to be admired by others. The Gurus taught that human beings should make the most of everything that God has given. However, if a person's actions and thoughts are focused on possessing the material things in life, he or she is no longer focused on God, then they are moving further and further from liberation and Mukti.

Excessive greed or lobh feeds into the ego (haumai) by glorifying the individual rather than God. In Sikhism, wealth should be used for the benefit of others, not for greedy aims.

Lobh dismantles the steadiness and peacefulness of the mind and leads it astray. It leads to "mendacity, exploitation and abuse of power".

=== Forms ===
According to Harbans Singh, Lobh can manifest in two forms:

1. profligate – enjoying one's wealth wastefully. One who is recklessly extravagant or wasteful of resources, essentially hedonistic
2. miser – accumulating one's wealth greedily. A hoarder of wealth who does not share it for the benefit of others

Both forms of lobh are criticized by Guru Arjan, who states:

... pelf becomes the breath of life for the greedy

— Guru Arjan, Guru Granth Sahib, page 914, The Encyclopedia of Sikhism (Vol. 2: E–L) by Harbans Singh

=== Solution ===
The antidote to lobh is contentment or santokh. Unlike other religious traditions, Sikhism does not prescribe renunciation from the world as a solution to lobh but rather discourages this method. The Sikh gurus advocate the lifestyle of grihastha, that is, the life of a normal householder. It does not advocate total abandonment of material possessions, but rather it teaches that the attachment to these possessions and desire for them is the problem. Furthermore, these material things do not remain with an individual after their death, and their impermanence is stressed. One accumulates paap (sin) in the process of collecting wealth.

Guru Amar Das gives a warning to the spiritual seekers:

Do not be led astray by maya... Know that your millions shall not keep you company.

— Guru Amar Das, Guru Granth Sahib, page 1087, The Encyclopedia of Sikhism (Vol. 2: E–L) by Harbans Singh

== Scriptural excerpts ==
The following Shabads from Gurbani clarify this cardinal vice:

- Their intellect and understanding are perverted;
  they just don't understand. They are filled with greed and corruption. (Guru Granth Sahib page 27 line 1129)
- The world is deceived and plundered by riches, youth, greed and egotism. (Guru Granth Sahib page 61 line 2477)
- When you are under the power of sexual desire, anger and worldly attachment, or a greedy miser in love with your wealth; if you have committed the four great sins and other mistakes; even if you are a murderous fiend ..... if you then come to remember the Supreme Lord God, and contemplate Him, even for a moment, you shall be saved. ((4)) (Guru Granth Sahib page 70 line 2828)
- Within is the terrible darkness of greed, and so they come and go in reincarnation, over and over again. ((7)) (Guru Granth Sahib page 130 line 5300)
- Cruelty, material attachment, greed and anger are the four rivers of fire. Falling into them, one is burned, O Nanak! One is saved only by holding tight to good deeds. ((2)) (Guru Granth Sahib page 147 line 6072)
- You practice greed, avarice and great falsehood, and you carry such a heavy burden. O body, I have seen you blowing away like dust on the earth. ((1)) (Guru Granth Sahib page 154 line 6435)
- With greed within them, their minds are filthy, and they spread filth around. They do filthy deeds, and suffer in pain. (Guru Granth Sahib page 1062 line 45337)
- Kabeer, where there is spiritual wisdom, there is righteousness and Dharma. Where there is falsehood, there is sin. Where there is greed, there is death. Where there is forgiveness, there is God Himself. ((155)) (Guru Granth Sahib page 1372 line 58353)
