= Krodh =

Wrath or rage in Sikh tradition

Five Evils

1. Kam (Lust) 2. Krodh (Rage) 3. Lobh (Greed) 4. Moh (Attachment) 5. Ahankar (Ego)

Krodh (Gurmukhi: ਕਰੋਧ Karōdha) is derived from the Sanskrit word krodha (क्रोध), which means wrath or rage. This is a state of mind recognized in Sikh philosophy as a spring of desire and is as such classified as one of the five evils. It also known as Kopu.

== Terms ==
Within the Sikh canon, the terms 'krodh' and 'kop' (a synonym) are both used to give name to this emotion.

== Description ==
It expresses itself in several forms from quiet seething to outbursts and even physical violence. In the Sikh scriptures, krodh usually appears linked to and in association with kam (another of the five thieves) — as "kam krodh". The merging of these two words is not merely for the sake of rhythmic effect. Krodh (ire) is the direct derivative of kam (desire). The latter when foiled or rejected manufactures the former. The scripture also includes krodh as being among the four rivers of fire.

Righteous anger or annoyance against wickedness, despotism, and imperiousness is not seen as the same as krodh as an undesirable passion. Several verses contained within the Guru Granth Sahib, especially ones authored by Guru Nanak and Bhagat Kabir, convey in forceful words their disapprobation of the moral, religious, and societal corruption of their period. According to Sikhism, such persons forget themselves and lose control. They are prone to using foul and abusive language.

=== Solution ===
A Sikh must aim to eliminate the negative influences of krodh from his life. Krodh is tamed by humility (nimrata) and by placing one's trust to the fullest extent in God.

== Scriptural excerpts ==
"Violence, attachment, covetousness and wrath," says Guru Nanak "are like four rivers of fire; those who fall in them burn, and can swim across, O Nanak, only through God's grace" (GG, 147). In other places Guru Nanak states, "Kam and krodh dissolve the body as borax melts gold" (GG, 932).

Guru Arjan, the fifth Sikh guru, describes the evil of krodh in this hymn: "O krodh, thou enslavest sinful men and then caperest around them like an ape. In thy company men become base and are punished variously by Death's messengers. The Merciful God, the Eradicator of the sufferings of the humble, O Nanak, alone saveth all" (GG, 1358).

Guru Ram Das, the fourth Sikh guru, informs about the dangers of krodh: "Do not go near those who are possessed by wrath uncontrollable" (GG, 40).

Guru Arjan's instruction on dealing with krodh: "Do not be angry with any one; search your own self and live in the world with humility. Thus, O Nanak, you may go across (the ocean of existence) under God's grace" (GG, 259).

Shaikh Farid, a Muslim saint in-which a substantial portion of hymns authored by him are preserved in the primary Sikh scripture, says in one of his couplets: "O Farid, do good to him who hath done thee evil and do not nurse anger in thy heart; no disease will then afflict thy body and all felicities shall be thine" (GG, 1381–82).
