= Kaam =

One of the Five Thieves of Sikhism

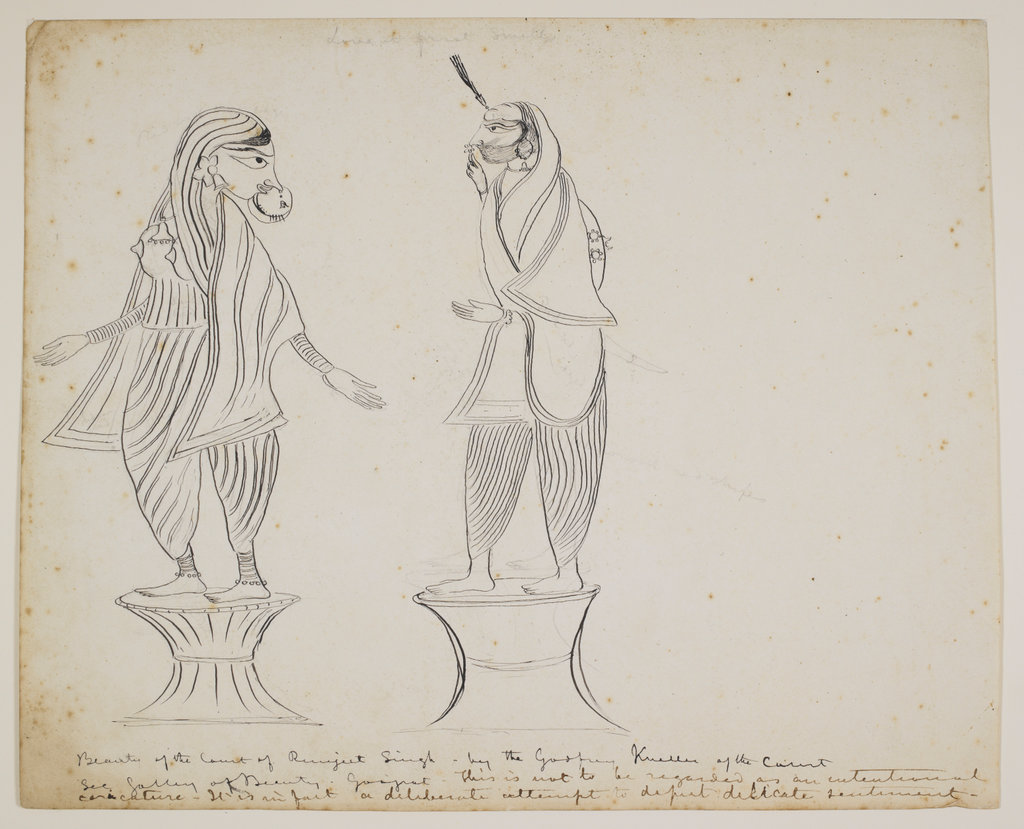
Drawing of an amorous Sikh couple by James Abbott, circa 1826–1867

Five Evils

1. Kam (Lust) 2. Krodh (Rage) 3. Lobh (Greed) 4. Moh (Attachment) 5. Ahankar (Ego)

Kaam (Punjabi: ਕਾਮ; Kāma) is one of the five thieves in Sikhism, described as excessive lust or desire. A devout Sikh is expected to be in control of Kaam at all times. It is linked to roop, one of the five thugs.

== Translation ==
The term has been rendered as translating to desire, longing, concupiscence, sensuality or lasciviousness in English.

== Description ==
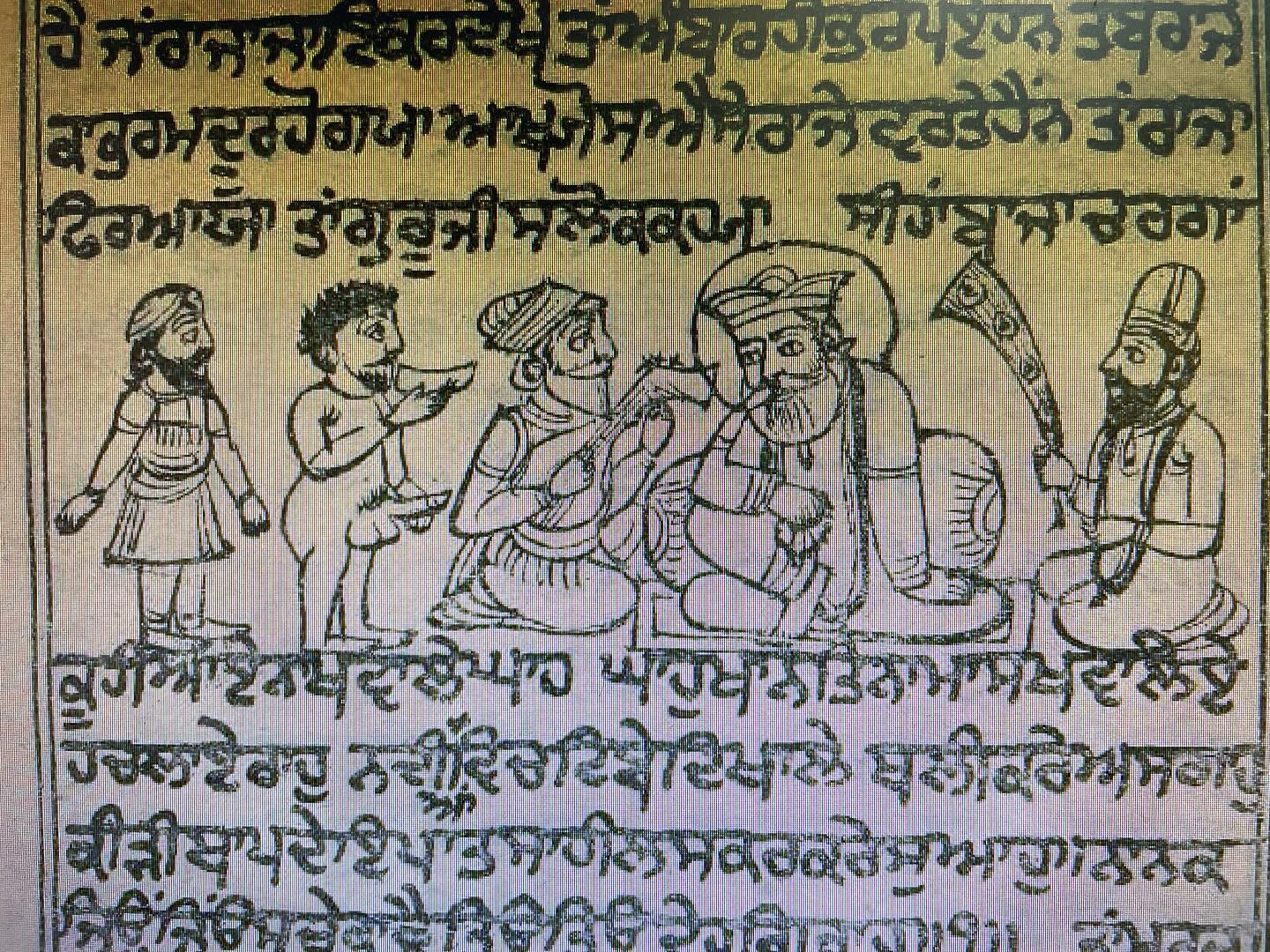
Artwork from a folio of a Janamsakhi manuscript depicting Kaljug (Kali Yuga) in the pr esence of Guru Nanak stating that he will bind the people in the vices of lust and gluttony whilst holding an erect penis

In common parlance, the term refers to excessive sexual desire. Sikhism views kaam as an urge that an individual must keep in-control from time to time. It is not viewed as dissimilar to other urges and cravings of the human experience that must also be periodically kept in-check.

Kaam becomes a true evil when it begins interfering with one's marital life, such as leading a spouse to cheat on their partner under its influence. Sikhism condemns kaam which interferes with the spiritual journey and day-to-day life of an individual.

Guru Tegh Bahadur states the following on the issue of kaam:

In the sinning heart reigns kaam and the fickle mind breaks out of control. Kaam casts its noose even upon yogis, jangams and sannyasis. Only those imbued with God's Name (fall not a prey to it) and are able to go across the ocean of existence

— Guru Tegh Bahadur, Guru Granth Sahib, page 1186, The Encyclopedia of Sikhism (Vol. 2: E–L) by Harbans Singh

The word refers to all desires but usually it is used in reference to desires which are sexual in-nature. Normal and healthy amounts of sexual lust and desire, such as between two married spouses, is not condemned in Sikhism but rather excessive amounts which interfere in one's spiritual journey is treated as both a vice and immoral. Kaam is not looked upon as wholly a biological phenomenon but also as a learnt behaviour in-which one can be influenced negatively by others.

The Guru Granth Sahib offers the following commentary on the nature of Kaam:

"O Kaam, you send men to hell and make them wander through myriad wombs. You cheat all minds; sway all the three worlds; and vanquish one's all austerities, meditation and culture. Your pleasures are illusory; you make men unsteady and weak; and punish the high and the low alike." (Guru Granth Sahib)

— H.S. Singha, Sikh Studies, book 7, page 65

Kaam is related and linked to lobh, another of the five thieves. Whilst kaam is the extreme desire for sexual things, lobh, on the other hand is the disproportionately large desire or covetousness for material things.

=== Extramarital connection ===
Sikh lover and a Kangra lady, c.1830, Pahari-Sikh style. From the family workshop of Purkhu.

Kaam is connected to the potential of transgressing upon one's marriage by cheating on their partner. This is warned against in Sikh texts, such as in the Varan of Bhai Gurdas. Bhai Gurdas says the consummate Sikh is utterly faithful to his wife and regards all other women as "mothers, sisters and daughters" in Varan 29:11.

Guru Gobind Singh gives the following piece of advice to his Sikhs:

Love your own wedded wife ever so more, but do not go to another woman's bed even in a dream.

— Guru Gobind Singh, 52 Hukams, The Encyclopedia of Sikhism (Vol. 2: E–L) by Harbans Singh

=== Solution ===
Since Sikhism does not advocate for celibacy and asceticism as fixes for kaam, it has taught other methods of dealing with the issue. There are two ways of dealing with kaam within Sikhism through channelization and redirection of the energy to other aims:

1. Adopting the life of a grihastha, that is, the married life of a householder.
2. Pyaar, one of the five virtues. Reaching a state of mind where one is totally emersed and imbued with the love of the divine. The implementation of Naam Simran is important for reaching this state of love for God.

Regarding the second way of sublimating kaam, Guru Gobind Singh makes the following remark the affirm this method:

Hear ye all, I proclaim here the truth: only they who love God find Him.

— Guru Gobind Singh

The ideal relationship between the divine and devotee in Sikhism is envisioned as a soul-bride, in-which the devotee is a wife longing for her husband (kant), which is God. This is a reoccurring theme that is repeated through the Sikh canon. The devotee is pained by the state of being separate from God and craves reunion with God. This procedure of complete devotion stifles the negative potentials of kaam and redirects its energy to spiritual progress for the individual.

Guru Arjan states on page 534 of the Guru Granth Sahib that a person who has truly fallen in love with God humbly seeks neither positions of power, authority, nor even spiritual liberation (mukti).

== Comparison to the concept of kama in other Indic religions ==
In the Hindu tradition, kaam is not always seen as a negative state of mind. There exists many Indic deities related to kaam, such as Kamadeva. Thus, unlike Sikhism, the concept does not necessarily imply adverse effects to the spiritual path as per Hinduism. It also views kama as one of the four Puruṣārtha of a human life.

However, certain schools and traditions of Hindu thought, such as the yogis of the Samkhya school, practice the suppression of kaam as part of their beliefs and practices.

Sikhism's conceptualization of kaam/kama is analogous to those of the Sramanic traditions, such as Buddhism and Jainism. These traditions see kaam as a source for alarm. Therefore, they have prescribed celibacy and asceticism as methods for dealing with kaam. This differs from Sikhism, which does not advocate for the lifestyle of a celibate or ascetic.

== See also ==
- Sikhism and sexual orientation
- Kama, a word with a similar meaning
- Religion and sexuality
- Lust
