= Outline of Sikhism =

Overview of and topical guide to Sikhism

The following outline is provides an overview of Sikhism, or Sikhi (its endonym).

Sikhism has been described as being either a panentheistic or monotheistic religion—emphasizing universal selflessness and brotherhood—founded in the 15th century upon the teachings of Guru Nanak and the ten succeeding Gurus. It is the fifth-largest organized religion in the world, and one of the fastest-growing.

The sacred text and last Guru of Sikhism, Guru Granth Sahib, teaches humans how to unite with the all cosmic soul; with God, the creator: "Only those who selflessly love everyone, they alone shall find God."

== Scripture and literature ==
=== Scripture ===
- Guru Granth Sahib — the sacred text and last Guru of Sikhism
  - Asa Di Var — 24 stanzas used as a morning prayer
  - Bhattan De Savaiye
  - Japji Sahib — the first 8 pages of the Guru Granth Sahib, consisting of hymns composed by Guru Nanak.
  - Kirtan Sohila
  - Laavaan — the four hymns of the Anand Karaj (Sikh wedding ceremony)
  - Mul Mantar — the opening words of the Guru Granth Sahib, citing the basic statement of creed in Sikhism.
  - Rehras — evening prayer
  - Sukhmani Sahib ('Psalm of Peace') — a popular set of hymns in the Guru Granth Sahib, divided into 24 sections
  - Ragmala
- Dasam Granth — the secondary holy book of Sikhism
  - 33 Savaiye
  - Benti Chaupai
  - Chandi di Var
  - Jaap Sahib — a morning prayer consisting of an introductory sloka, 38 stanzas (pauris), and a concluding sloka attributed by some to Guru Angad.
  - Tav-Prasad Savaiye (or Amrit Savaiye) — short composition of 10 stanzas, as part of nitnem
- Sarbloh Granth — a voluminous scripture consisting of more than 6,500 poetic stanzas, considered as amalgamation of the writings of poets including Guru Gobind Singh.
- Varan Bhai Gurdas — the name given to the 40 vaars (a form of Punjabi poetry) wrriten attributed by Bhai Gurdas, providing early concepts of Sikhism and Sikh living.

=== Sikh literature ===
- Guru Maneyo Granth — historic statement of the 10th Guru, Guru Gobind Singh
- Janamsakhi — non-canonical history of Guru Nanak
  - Bala Janamsakhi — a collection of janamsakhis by Bhai Bala (generally accepted as authoritative).
  - Mani Singh Janamsakhi or Gyan ratanavali — a collection dating from the time of the last Guru.
  - Miharban Janamsakhi — janamsakhis written by the followers of Prithi Chand.
  - Puratan Janamsakhi — an early collection of janamsakhis by an unknown author.
- Panth Parkash — non-canonical Sikh history
- Suraj Parkash — non-canonical Sikh history
- Zafarnama — letter by Guru Gobind Singh to Aurangzeb

=== Associated terms ===
- Ardās
- Bhagat Bani — any of the writings that appear in the Guru Granth Sahib which were not written by the Gurus.
- Gurbani (abbreviated as bani) — general term for Gurus' writings
- Gurbani sangeet or Gurmat sangeet — singing of hymns
- Gutka — a small sized breviary or prayer book containing chosen hymns (banis) from Sikh scriptures
- Nitnem — daily recitations
- Paath
- Savaiya — a form of poetry written in praise of someone, in which every verse is 1/4 times the length of a common verse.
- Shabda — the hymns contained in Sikh scriptures.
- Sloka — 'stanza'; the Sanskrit epic metre formed of 32 syllables: verses of 2 lines (distich) of 16 syllables each or in 4 half-lines (hemistich) of 8 syllables each.

== Philosophy and beliefs ==
- Waheguru — God
  - Akal
  - Akal Purakh
  - Ik Onkar (or Ek Onkar)
  - Monoism
  - Nirankar
  - Nirguna
  - Nirbau, Nirvair — Without fear and Without hate
  - Sarav viāpak
  - Sarguna
  - Satguru — 'true God'
  - Satnam — '[God's] name is true'
- 3 pillars of Sikhism
  - Naam Japo — meditation on the name of God
  - Kirat Karo — earning a living honestly, without exploitation or fraud
  - Vand Chhako — sharing with others; helping those with less or those who are in need
- 5 Virtues
  - Sat — 'truth'
  - Santokh — 'contentment, satisfaction'
  - Daya — 'compassion, kindness'
  - Nimrata — 'humility, benevolence'
  - Pyaar — 'love'
- Bole So Nihal
- Charhdi Kala — the aspiration to maintain a mental state of eternal optimism and joy.
- Five Thieves
  - Kaam — 'lust'
  - Krodh — 'anger, wrath'
  - Lobh — 'greed'
  - Moh — 'attachment'
  - Hankaar — 'ego, pride'
- Gurmat
- Hukam
- Idolatry in Sikhism
- Khalsa — 'pure'
- Nirguni bhakti
- Raj Karega Khalsa
- Sarbat da bhalla — welfare (bhalla) of mankind (sarbat)
- Seva — selfless service
- Shakti
- Sikh Rehat Maryada – code of conduct
- Simran — the remembrance of Waheguru.

=== Relation to other religions ===
- Hinduism and Sikhism
- Islam and Sikhism
- Jainism and Sikhism

== Practices and culture ==
- Amrit — elixir of immortality; the sanctified nectar or sugar water substitute used in ceremonies. It is prepared by stirring it in an iron bowl with the double-edged sword and continuous recitation of five banis by the five selected members of the Khalsa.
- Dasvand — a kind of Sikh tithe; the act of donating 10% of one's harvest, both financially and in the form of time and service (i.e., seva) to the Gurdwara and community.
- Five Ks — five articles of faith worn by baptised, or khalsa, Sikhs:
  - Kesh — uncut hair
  - Kangha — a comb
  - Kara — a circular iron bracelet
  - Kirpan — a small dagger
  - Kachera — special underwear short
- Katha — sermon, religious discourse
- Kirtan — musical recitation
- Langar — communal kitchen where free food is distributed to all comers
  - Pangat
- Naam Japo — meditation on the name of God
  - Jaap — 'recitation'
- Prohibitions (kurahit kurahat), including:
  - Cutting, trimming, shaving or removing hairs from one's body — Sikhs practice kesh, allowing their hair to grow out naturally in respect to God's creation
  - Intoxication
  - Castism
  - Kutha meat — eating meat killed in a ritualistic manner (particularly halal or kosher meat), or any meat where langar is served (except jatkha meat).
- Sangat — community of followers
- Seva — selfless service
  - Sevadar — one who volunteers
  - Kar seva
  - Kar sevak
- Sikh Rehat Maryada — code of conduct

=== Sikh ceremonies ===
- Anand Karaj ('blissful union, joyful union') — the Sikh marriage ceremony, first introduced by Guru Amar Das.
- Akhand Path — continuous reading of Sri Guru Granth Sahib, either in honour of a particular occasion or simply to increase one's feeling of connection to God. Akhand Paths can be held, for example, in honour of a birth/birthday, wedding/anniversary, recovery from a medical operation, death, or a historic occasion; to celebrate the achievement of a goal such as a graduation or passing the driving test; or in chasing away evil spirits and curses, etc.
- Amrit Sanchar — baptism into the Khalsa tradition
- Antam Sanskar — funeral rites
- Naam Karan — child's naming ceremony
- Sadharan Paath

=== Sikh festivals ===
- Bandi Chhor Divas — a celebration during Diwali
- Gurpurab — the celebration of an anniversary of a Guru's birth, particularly that of Guru Nanak.
- Guru Ladho Re Diwas
- Mela Maghi
- Nagar Kirtan
- Vasakhi — a festival during late Spring

=== General Sikh culture ===
- Dastar — turban (pagri); an inseparable part of Sikh dress that is mandatory for Sikh males according to Guru Granth Sahib and the Sikh Rehat Maryada.
- Diet in Sikhism
- Gatka — Sikh martial art
- Idolatry in Sikhism
- Karah Parshad
- Khanda — an Indian-double edged sword that is used as the primary symbol of the Sikh faith. It appears on the Nishan Sahib that flies over gurdwaras.
- Kirtan — musical recitation
- Nanakshahi calendar — the calendar used in Sikhism
  1. Chet
  2. Vaisakh
  3. Jeth
  4. Harh
  5. Sawan
  6. Bhadon
  7. Assu
  8. Katak
  9. Maghar
  10. Poh
  11. Magh
  12. Phagun
- Punjabi language
  - Gurmukhi — the written form of Punjabi used in the Sikh scriptures (and in Punjab, India, more generally) propagated by Guru Nanak and Guru Angad. It is contrast to shahmukhi, which is the Islamic script for Punjabi (used in Punjab, Pakistan).
  - Sant Bhasha
- Ragi — Sikh musician who performs hymns
- Sikhism and sexual orientation

== Sikh geography ==
Map of Ranjit Singh's empire at its peak

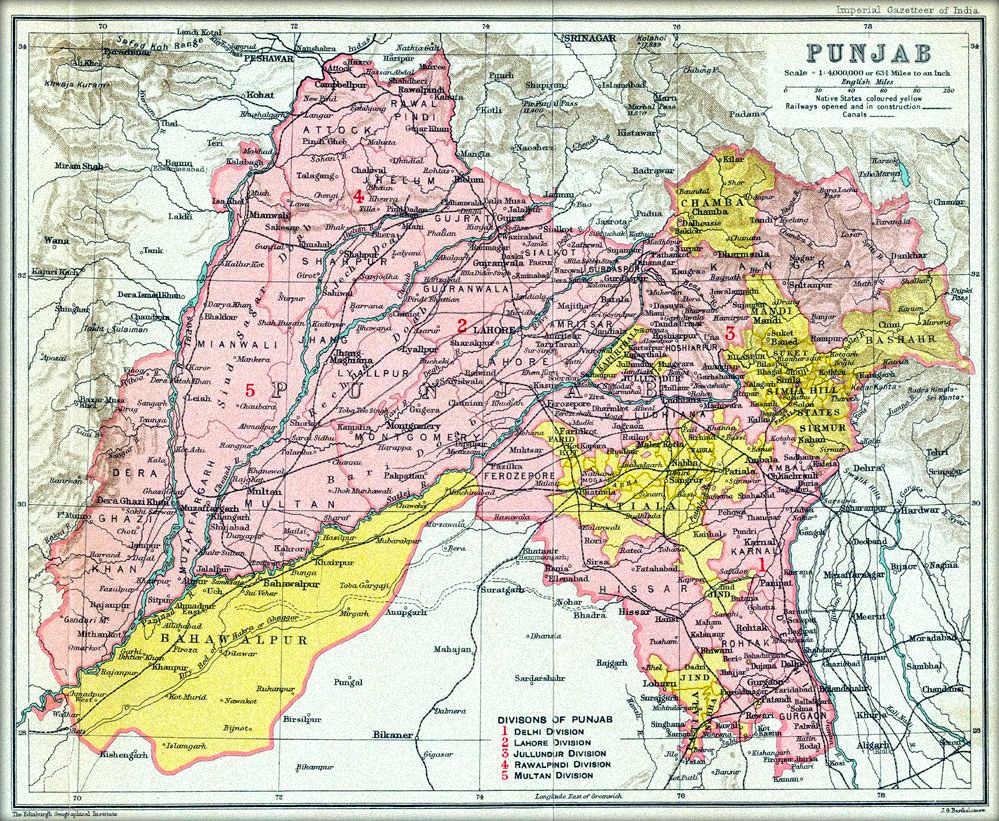
Map of Punjab Province (British India), 1909

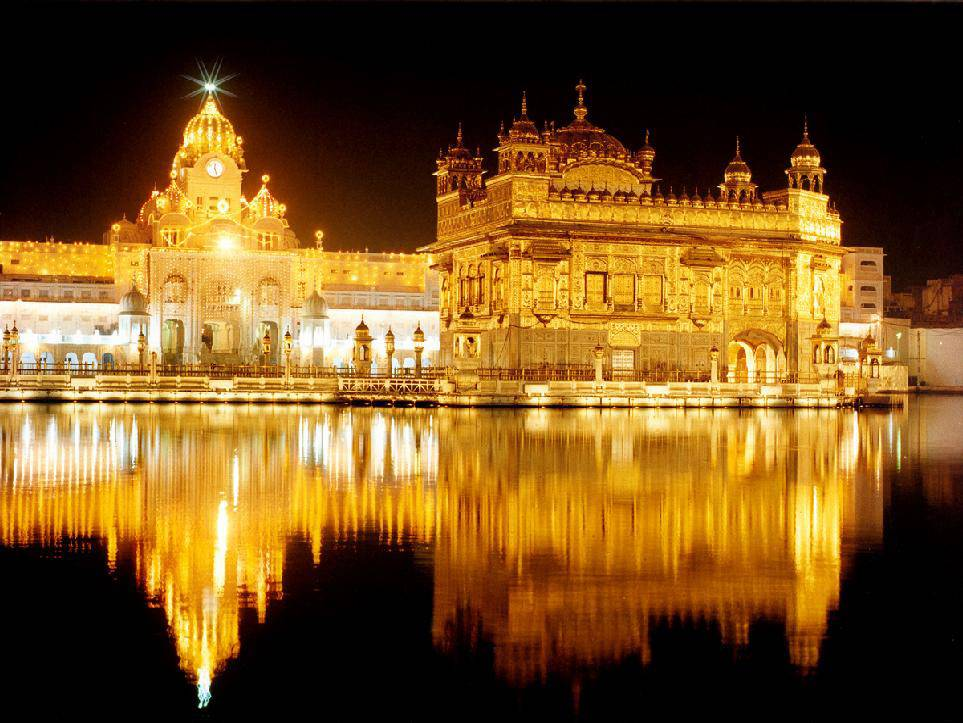
Harmandir Sahib (the Golden Temple) at night, in Amritsar, India

- Akal Takhat ('Eternal Throne') — nominal seat of Sikh temporal/political authority.
- Amritsar — the holy city of Sikhism, home to 1.5 million in the northwestern part of India.
  - Harmandir Sahib (or Golden Temple) — the holy shrine of Sikhs; the spiritual and cultural center of the Sikh religion, found in Amritsar.
- Anandpur Sahib — the birthplace of the Khalsa
  - Virasat-e-Khalsa — a Sikh museum in Anandpur
- Goindval Sahib
- Kartarpur — seat of Guru Nanak's first school.
- Nankana Sahib — birthplace of Guru Nanak
- Patna Sahib
- Samadhi of Ranjit Singh — a building in Lahore, Pakistan that houses the funerary urns of Sikh ruler Ranjit Singh
- Takht

=== Sikhism by country ===
- Sikhism in Australia
- Sikhism in Afghanistan
- Sikhs in Belgium
- Sikhism in Canada
- Sikhs in Fiji
- Sikhism in India
- Sikhism in New Zealand
- Sikhism in Pakistan
- Sikhism in Thailand
- Sikhism in Trinidad and Tobago
- Sikhism in the United Arab Emirates
- Sikhism in the United Kingdom
- Sikhism in the United States

=== Gurdwaras ===
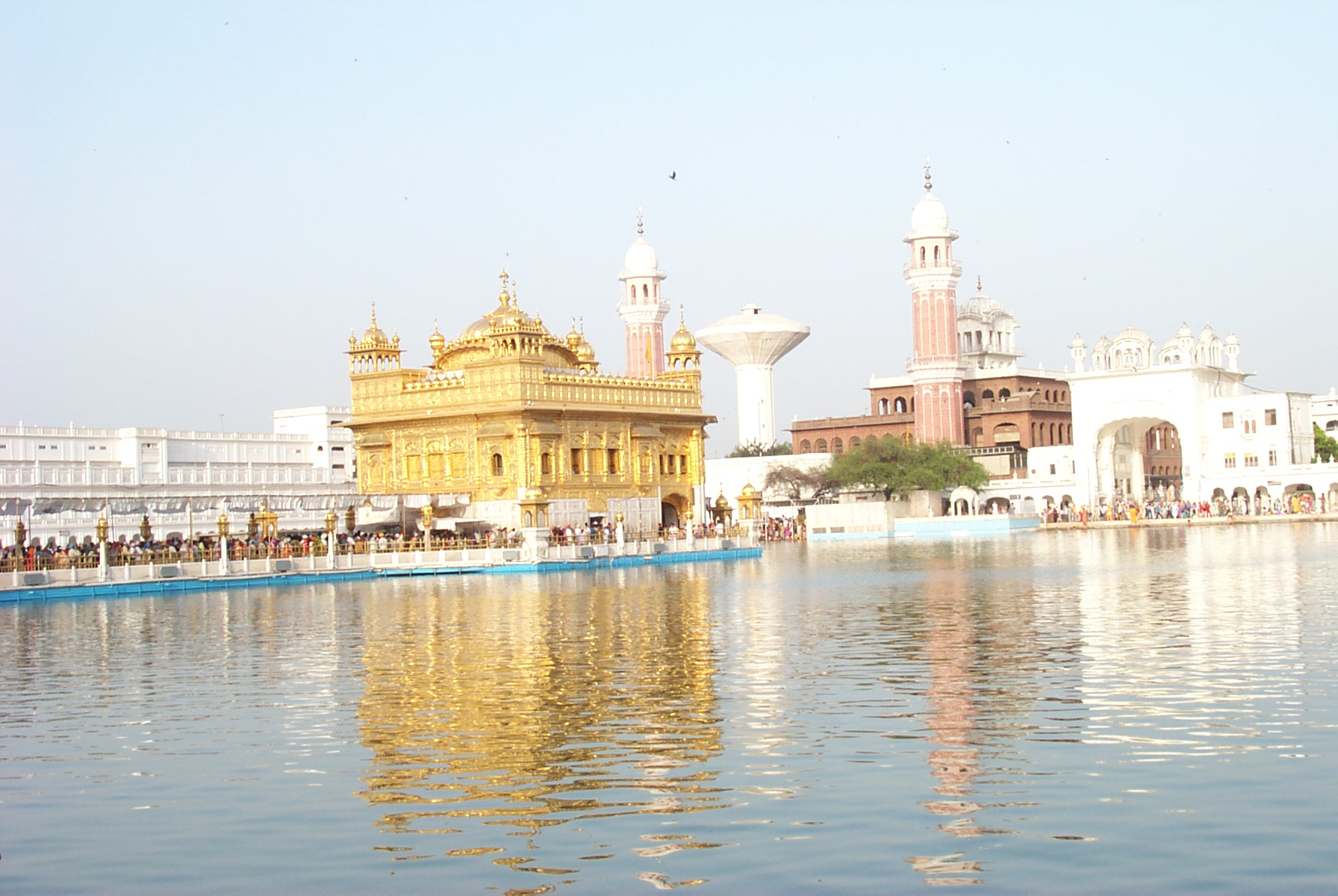
The Harmandir Sahib, Sikh Gurdwara and spiritual centre at Amritsar, India

Nishan Sahib

==== In India ====
The Harmandir Sahib (or Golden Temple) is the holy shrine of Sikhs; the spiritual and cultural center of the Sikh religion, found in Amritsar. The Shiromani Gurudwara Parbandhak Committee (SGPC) is the organization responsible for the management of gurdwaras in the states of Punjab, Haryana, and Himachal Pradesh, and the union territory of Chandigarh

Other gurdwaras in India include:

- Gurdwara Bangla Sahib
- Gurdwara Sri Tarn Taran Sahib
- Goindwal Sahib

==== In the United States ====
- Gurdwara Sahib Fremont
- Sikh Gurdwara - San Jose
- Sikh Religious Society of Chicago

==== Gurdwaras in Pakistan ====
- Kartarpur — seat of Guru Nanak's first school.
- Nankana Sahib — birthplace of Guru Nanak.

==== Other gurdwaras ====
- Gurdwaras in Canada
- Khalsa Diwan Sikh Temple (Hong Kong)
- Gurdwara Sahib Klang (Malaysia)
- Central Sikh Temple — the first gurdwara in Singapore
- Gurdwara Sri Guru Singh Sabha Southall (London)

=== Other Sikh institutions ===
- Damdami Taksal
- Guru Nanak Dev University
- Guru Nanak Khalsa College of Arts, Science & Commerce
- Khalsa College, Amritsar
- Pingalwara
- Satnam Trust
- Sikh American Legal Defense and Education Fund
- Sikh Phulwari
- Sikh Reference Library
- Thai Sikh International School

== Sikh politics, military, and administration ==
=== Organizations ===
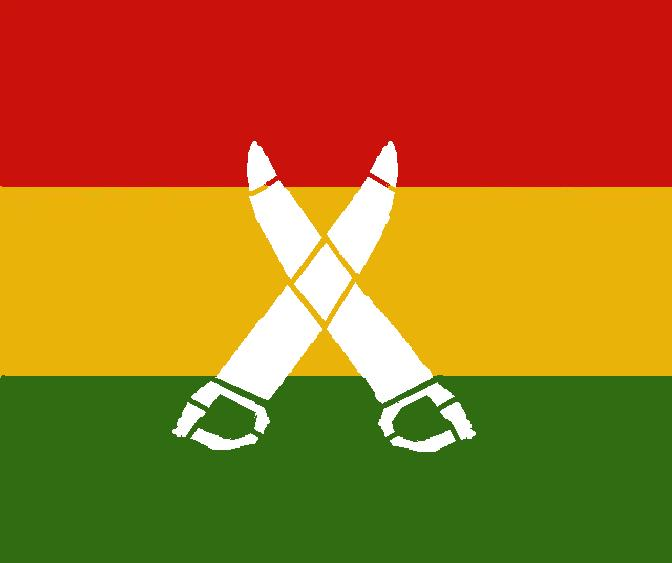
Ghadar Party flag

- All India Sikh Students Federation
- British Sikh Student Federation
- Delhi Sikh Gurdwara Management Committee
- Ghadar Party
- Haryana State Akali Dal
- Punjab Janata Morcha
- Shiromani Akali Dal
  - Sarb Hind Shiromani Akali Dal
  - Shiromani Akali Dal (Amristsar)
  - Shiromani Akali Dal Delhi
  - Shiromani Akali Dal (Democratic)
  - Shiromani Akali Dal (Longowal)
  - Shiromani Akali Dal (Panthik)
- Shiromani Gurudwara Parbandhak Committee (SGPC) — the organization responsible for the management of gurdwaras in the states of Punjab, Haryana, and Himachal Pradesh, and the union territory of Chandigarh
- Sikh Manji — Sikh administrative unit
- United Sikhs
- World Sikh Organization

=== Military ===
- Misl
- Piri System
- Sant Sipahi
- Sikh Empire
- Sikh Khalsa Army
- Sikh Light Infantry
- Sikh Regiment

=== Movements ===
- Akali movement
- Babbar Akali movement
- Ghadar movement
- Khalistan movement — a separatist movement to create a Sikh homeland, often named Khālistān (Punjabi: ਖ਼ਾਲਿਸਤਾਨ, Hindi: ख़ालिस्तान, 'Land of the Khalsa'), composed of the Punjab region of modern-day India and Pakistan.
- Singh Sabha Movement

== History of Sikhism ==
- 1469–1539 — Time of Guru Nanak
- 1606 — Guru Arjan executed succeeded bu Guru Hargobind who start the Sikh martial tradition.
- 1675 — Guru Tegh Bahadur executed for protesting for religious freedom
- 1699 — Khalsa Sajana Divas
- 1708 — Guru Granth Sahib becomes eternal Guru
- 1710–1715 — Banda Singh's Raj
- 1716–1799 — Sikh Confederacy
  - 1752–1801 — Sukerchakia
- 1746 — Chhota Ghallughara ('small massacre') — a massacre of a significant proportion of the Sikh population by the Mughal Empire, in which Jaspat Rai's brother Lakhpat Rai with the Mughal army killed an estimated 7,000 Sikhs died.
- 1762 — Vadda Ghalughara ('large massacre') — a mass-murder of unarmed Sikhs by the Afghan forces of the Durrani Empire, during the years of Afghan influence in the Punjab region.
- 1799–1849 — Sikh Empire
  - 1845–46 — First Anglo-Sikh War
  - 1848–49 — Second Anglo-Sikh War
- 1897 — Battle of Saragarhi — a last-stand battle during the British Raj
- 1919 April 13 — Jallianwalla Bagh Massacre (or Amritsar Massacre)
- 1920–25 — Akali movement
- 1984 June 1–8 — Operation Blue Star — a military operation inside the Harmandar Sahib
- 1984 November — 1984 anti-Sikh riots
- 2012 August 5 — Wisconsin Sikh temple shooting

=== Battles ===
- 1621 — Battle of Rohilla
- 1634 — Battle of Lahira
- 1634 — Battle of Amritsar (1634)
- 1635 — Battle of Kartarpur
- 1686 September — Battle of Bhangani
- 1691 — Battle of Nadaun
- 1696 — Battle of Guler
- 1700 — Battle of Anandpur (1700)
- 1700 — Second Battle of Anandpur
- 1701 — Battle of Anandpur (1701)
- 1702 — Battle of Basoli
- 1702 — First Battle of Chamkaur.
- 1704 — First Battle of Anandpur (1704)
- 1704 December — Battle of Sarsa
- 1704 December 6 — Second Battle of Chamkaur.
- 1705 December 29 — Battle of Muktsar
- 1709 — Battle of Sonepat
- 1709 — Battle of Samana
- 1710 — Battle of Sadhaura
- 1710 — Battle of Rahon
- 1710 — Battle of Jalalabad
- 1710 May — Battle of Chappar Chiri
- 1710 December — Battle of Lohgarh
- 1712 — Battle of Jammu
- 1715 — Siege of Gurdaspur
- 1715 April — Battle of Gurdas Nangal
- 1757 — Battle of Amritsar (1757)
- 1761 — Battle of Sialkot (1761)
- 1761 — Battle of Gujranwala
- 1761 — Sikh Occupation of Lahore
- 1762 — Battle of Harnaulgarh
- 1762 February 5 — Battle of Kup
- 1763 —Battle of Sialkot (1763)
- 1764 —Battle of Sirhind
- 1783 — Capture of Delhi and Red Fort
- 1809 March–August — Gurkha-Sikh War
- 1813 July 13 — Battle of Attock
- 1818 March–June — Battle of Multan
- 1819 July 3 — Battle of Shopian
- 1834 — Battle of Peshawar
- 1837 — Battle of Jamrud
- 1841–42 — Sino-Sikh War
- 1845 December — Battle of Mudki
- 1845 December — Battle of Ferozeshah
- 1846 — Battle of Baddowal
- 1846 January — Battle of Aliwal
- 1846 February — Battle of Sobraon
- 1848 November — Battle of Ramnagar
- 1848 April–1849 January — Siege of Multan
- 1849 January — Battle of Chillianwala
- 1849 — Battle of Gujrat
- 1897 — Battle of Saragarhi

== People ==
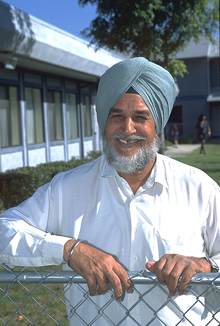
Sikh man in turban

Sikhs are members of the Sikh religion. A sangat is a society or congregation of Sikhs.

=== Titles and labels ===
- Amritdhari — baptized Sikh; anyone who has been initiated into the Khalsa, according to Sikh Reht Maryada.
- Brahmgiani — highly enlightened individual who has obtained the ultimate blessings of Waheguru.
- Granthi — the Sikh that reads Guru Granth Sahib
- Gurmukh — a person who is spiritually centered. A person who lives within the will of God and accepts all good and bad that happens to one's self without question or annoyance. A gurmukh stands in contrast to a manmukh.
- Gursikh
- Gyani
- Jathedar
  - Jathedar of Akal Takht
- Kar sevak
- Manmukh — a self-centered person, contrast to gurmukh. A person who lives within the will of the Mind as opposed to the will of god.
- Nihang — a warrior Sikh
- Nirankari — an offshoot of Sikhism
- Patit — apostate
- Sahajdhari — unbaptized Sikh.
- Sant Sipahi
- Sardar — a word contemporarily used to address or denote a turban-wearing Sikh male. The term initially used by Sikh leaders and generals who held important positions in various Sikh Misls of the Sikh Empire.
- Sevadar — one who volunteers for seva
- Shaheed — title used before the name of a person who has died as a Sikh martyr.
  - Saka Sirhind
- Sikh names
  - Kaur ('princess') — the middle name or surname given to Sikh females
  - Singh ('lion') — the middle name or surname given to Sikh males
- Udasi — a religious sect of ascetic sadhus who were key interpreters of the Sikh philosophy and the custodians of important Sikh shrines until the Akali movement. Modern-day udasis consider themselves more to be Hindu rather than Sikhs.

=== Sikh Gurus ===
- Guru Nanak Dev — According to the traditional historical Sikh sources Guru Nanak Dev appeared on earth in the month of Katak Oct/November 1469 which is celebrated every year in the month of October/November. The SGPC which was founded in 1925, states the avtar date as 15 April 1469. The Sikhs believe that all subsequent Gurus possessed Guru Nanak's divinity and the one spirit of Akaal Purakh Waheguru.
- Guru Angad Dev (1504–52) — disciple of Guru Nanak Dev and second of the ten Sikh Gurus.
- Guru Amar Das (1479–1574) — third of the ten Sikh Gurus.
- Guru Ram Das ( 1534–81) — fourth of the ten Sikh Gurus.
- Guru Arjan Dev (1563–1605) — fifth of the ten Sikh Gurus. He was arrested and executed by Jahangir in 1605.
- Guru Har Gobind (1596–1638) — son of Guru Arjan Dev and the sixth of the ten Sikh Gurus.
- Guru Har Rai (1630–61) — grandson of Guru Har Gobind and seventh of the ten Sikh Gurus.
- Guru Har Krishan (1656–64) — son of Guru Har Rai and eighth of the ten Sikh Gurus.
- Guru Tegh Bahadur (1621–75) — grand uncle of Guru Har Krishan and ninth of the ten Sikh Gurus. He was executed on the orders of Mughal Emperor Aurangzeb in Delhi.
- Guru Gobind Singh(1666–1708) — son of Guru Tegh Bahadur and tenth of the ten Sikh Gurus. He named the holy scripture, as his successor
- Guru Granth Sahib — the spiritual religious text of Sikhism, said to be the sole and final successor of the line of gurus. It is the eternal living Guru. the final and eternal guru of the Sikhs.

=== Notable people ===
- Pre-1400
  - Jayadeva — a Sanskrit poet who is the earliest-dated author of two hymns in the Guru Granth Sahib.
- 1400–1499
  - Bhagat Beni
  - Bhai Mardana — Guru Nanak's constant Muslim companion, musician, and composer of Sikh hymns.
  - Bhai Lalo
  - Bibi Nanki — Guru Nanak's sister and often considered his first disciple.
  - Sri Chand — Guru Nanak's son and founder of an early Sikh sect.
- 1500–1599
  - Baba Buddha — one of the most revered Sikh saints and anointer of several of the early Sikh Gurus.
  - Bhai Gurdas — one of the most revered Sikh saints and writer of the Vars.
  - Bhai Bala
  - Mian Mir
- 1600–1699
  - Panj Pyare (or Panj Piare; literally 'five beloved ones') — the title given to five Sikhs by Guru Gobind Singh at the historic divan at Anandpur Sahib on 30 March 1699, forming the nucleus of the Khalsa as the first batch to receive at his hands Khanda di Pahul (i.e. rites of the two-edged sword). These five Sikhs were:
    - Bhai Daya Singh
    - Bhai Dharam Singh
    - Bhai Himmat Singh
    - Bhai Mohkam Singh
    - Bhai Sahib Singh
  - Moti Ram Mehra
  - Bhai Mani Singh
  - Pir Budhan Shah
  - Baba Bidhi Chand
  - Bhai Kanhaiya
  - Chhotte Sahibzade
- 1700–1799
  - Banda Singh Bahadur
  - Baba Deep Singh
  - Bhai Taru Singh
  - Tara Singh Wan
  - Jassa Singh Ahluwalia
  - Jassa Singh Ramgarhia
- 1800–1899
  - Akali Phula Singh
  - Baba Nand Singh ji
  - Maharajah Ranjit Singh
  - Nawab Kapur Singh
  - Baba Ram Singh
  - Pundit Tara Singh
- 1900–1999
  - Bhagat Puran Singh
  - G. B. Singh
  - Baba Gurdit Singh
  - Giani Gurdit Singh
  - H. S. Phoolka
  - Sant Baba Harnam Singh
  - Ishar Singh
  - Bhai Kahn Singh Nabha
  - Bhai Randhir Singh
  - Giani Sant Singh Maskeen
  - Bhai Vir Singh

== General concepts ==
- Brahmavidya — knowledge of the Divine
- Vand Chhako — charity (or daan); one of the three petitions, alongside naam and ishnan.
- Dasvand — 10% of earnings donated to the less advantaged.
- Gurbani (abbreviated as bani) — verses; applied to any of the collective writings of the Sikh Gurus that appear in the Guru Granth Sahib.
- Gurdwara (or gurudwara; literally 'God's door, God's place') — Sikh place of worship
- Ik Onkar (or Ek Onkar) — One formless, genderless universal Lord called Wahguru
- Ishnan — ablution, purification of body and mind; one of the three petitions, alongside naam and daan.
- Jaap — recite.
- Kirat Karo — earning a living honestly, without exploitation or fraud
- Laavaan
- Naam — remembrance of the Divine name
  - Naam Japo — meditation on the name of God
- Takhat
- Tankhah — social offense, such as giving dowry, using liquors and intoxicants, raising monuments over graves, and associating with apostates.

== Pop culture ==
- Chaar Sahibzaade: Rise of Banda Singh Bahadur
- Sarbloh Warriors — a computer game based around Sikh resistance against Mughal rule
- Kesari (2019 film)
- Nanak Shah Fakir
- Singh Is Kinng (2008)
- Singh Is Bliing (2015)

== See also ==
- Glossary of Sikhism (alphabetical)
- Interfaith dialog
