= Idolatry in Sikhism =

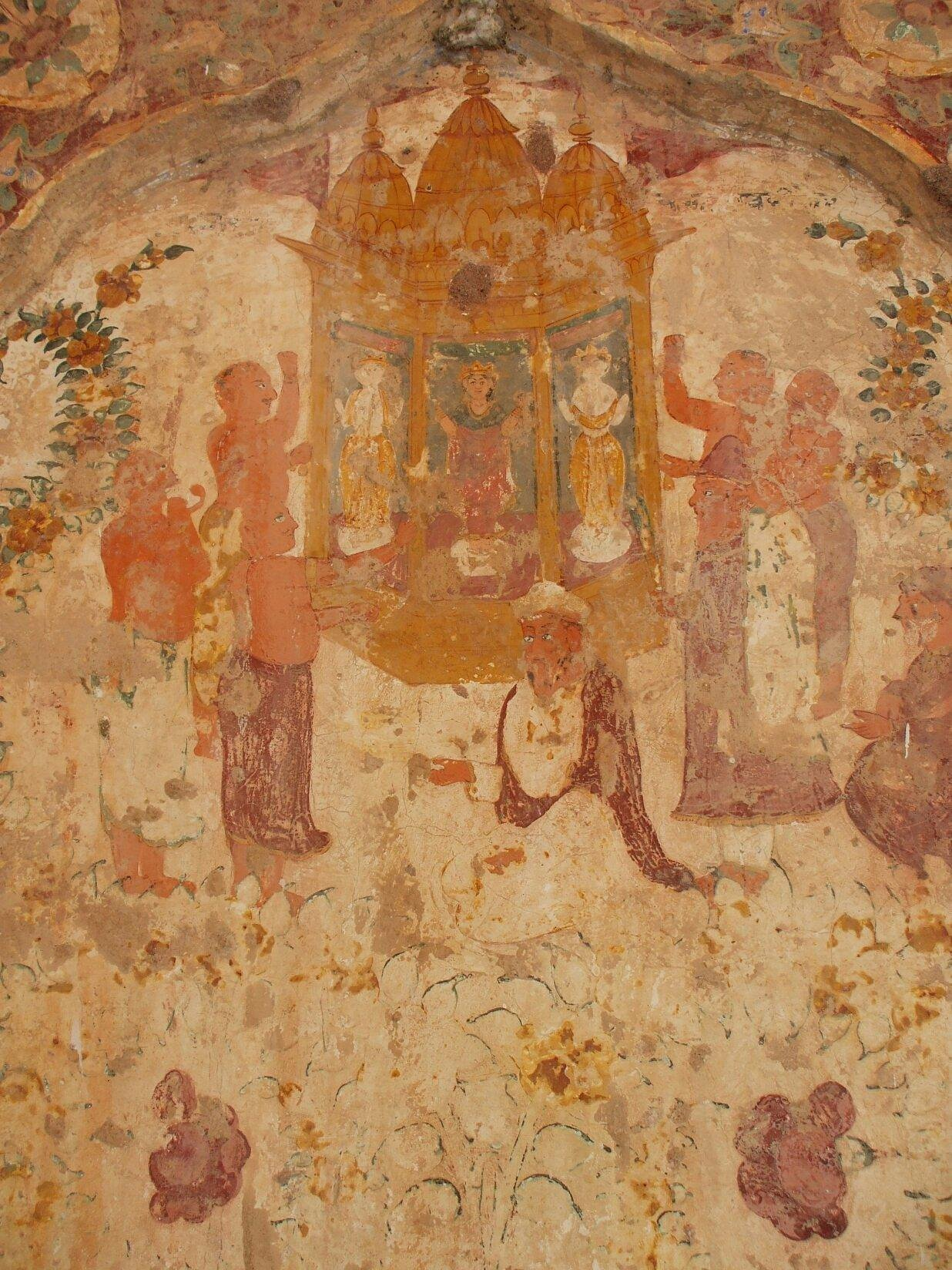
Detailed view of the fresco of Guru Nanak seated and Bhai Bala standing near a Hindu religious event involving idols from Gurdwara Baba Atal, Amritsar

Sikhism prohibits idolatry, in accordance with mainstream Khalsa norms and the teachings of the Sikh Gurus, a position that has been accepted as orthodox.

Growing Sikh popular discontent with Gurdwara administration and practices during the 1800s, revivalist movements in the mid-1800s who opposed idol worship like the Nirankaris and the Namdharis (who however have followed a living guru since its inception), and the encroachment of Brahmanical customs in the Golden Temple during that period, led to the establishment of the Singh Sabha Movement in 1873, in which the Tat Khalsa faction, dominant since the early 1880s, pushed to renew and standardize the practice of Sikhism. After a period of political advancement, the Khalsa faction re-established direct control over Gurdwara management over the Udasi and Hindu mahants, who institutionalized idol worship and would eventually identify with the Sanatan Sikhs, who identified with the Brahmanical social structure and considered idol worship as not harmful. The mahants had gained control of Gurdwaras after heavy Mughal persecution forced the Khalsa to relinquish control of the Gurdwaras and vacate the Punjab plains in the 1700s; they were most prominent in the 1800s.

In 1905, after re-establishing institutional control, the Khalsa managed to have removed the idols installed during the preceding period, as well as ending mahant administration and the practice of other non-Sikh, Brahmanical rituals in the process, considering them "Hindu accretions" and "Brahmanical stranglehold," amidst a major controversy within the Sikh community of that era. The prohibition, state Fenech and McLeod, has also served a means to assert Sikhism differs from Hinduism.

== Sikh texts ==
Idol worship is mentioned as a futile and worthless practice in the Sikh texts such as the Guru Granth Sahib and the Dasam Granth. In the Guru Granth Sahib, the teachings of Guru Nanak call the practice of worshipping stones as useless and ridiculous. These stones cannot answer any questions nor provide spiritual guidance as the guru can, states Nanak, and only the guidance of a guru can carry one across the "Ocean of Existence". For example, in the following hymn of Guru Granth Sahib, Namdev rejects idol worship.

One stone is lovingly decorated, while another stone is walked upon. If one is a god, then the other must also be a god. Says Naam Dayv, I serve the Lord.

— Namdev, Guru Granth Sahib 525

Idolatry is criticized in the Dasam Granth traditionally attributed to the tenth Guru Gobind Singh. The Dasam Granth includes idolatry along with other practices such as smearing sandal paste, offering food, visiting graves and tombs, bowing and others as futile and unhelpful in knowing God.

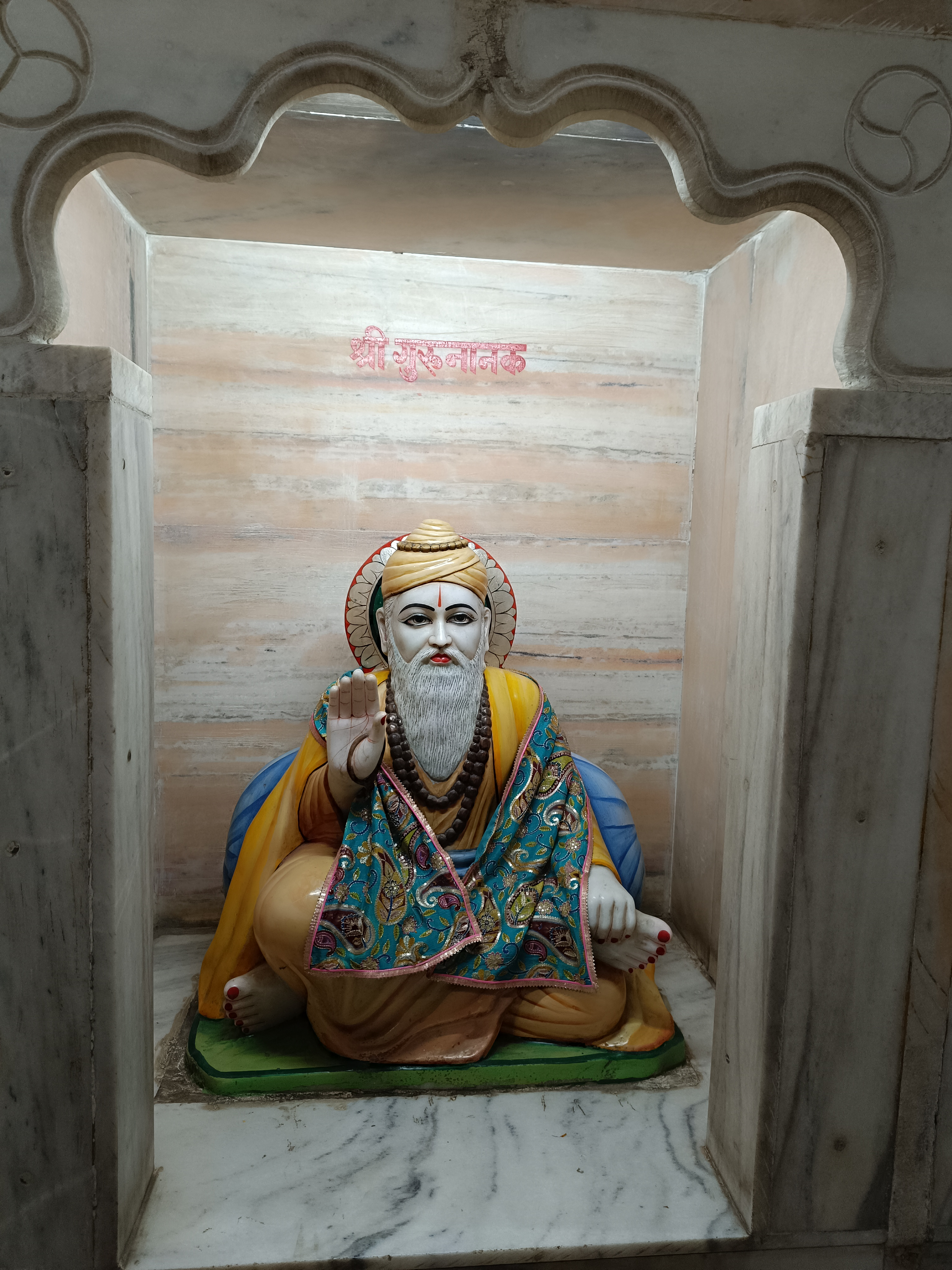
Guru Nanak idol at Muktidham Temple, Nashik

According to the Indologist Harold Coward, the Sikh scriptures critique idolatry and Guru Nanak's words protest and condemn empty, magical worship of idols. But, states Coward, an icon treated as a symbol that does not confuse the physical with the spiritual, and with the "right motivation and understanding", the Sikh scripture does not exclude the reverence of the Guru Granth, which accompanies ritual devotional singing in Sikh Gurdwaras.

== Historical references to idolatry ==
=== Zafarnama and Dasam Granth ===
The Zafarnama, or letter of victory, was written in Persian to Aurangzeb in 1705 by Guru Gobind Singh after the battle of Chamkaur. In the Zafarnama, Guru Gobind Singh chastises the Mughal Emperor Aurangzeb for promising safe passage to his family but then reneging on that promise. The 95th couplet, in Persian, referring to his battles with the Mughal-allied hill rajas of the Sivalik Hills, states:

"I, too, have fought against the hill-chieftains (kūhīyān, "hill-men") [who] venerate idols. As they are idol worshippers, so I am the idol-breaker."

The Dasam Granth where the Zafarnama is found, is a complex text; considered as the second scripture by some Sikhs, while others dispute its authority and the authorship of certain parts. It also includes the 33 Savaiye, or "33 quatrains," of which quatrains 19 through 21 specifically address the futility of idol worship. The ritual sastar puja (worship of weapons) in the Khalsa tradition for some scholars, states Singh, is akin to idol worship. In Sikh scholarship, the ritual is denied as the worship of God, rather it is defended as the worship of what the weapons iconographically represent to the Sikh: adi shakti (power of God). These verses are related to Khalsa's preparation for the war against the Mughals and "enabling the destruction of the enemy".

=== Dabestan-e Mazaheb ===
The Dabestan-e Mazaheb is a mid-17th-century text on religions in India. The text does not disclose the author, and it is unclear who authored it. Some credit it to Muhsin Fani – possibly a Persian Muslim, some to Maubad Ardastani – possibly a Zoroastrian, and some to either Mirza Zu'lfiqar Beg or Kaikhusrau Isfandyar. The text survives in two major manuscript versions with several notable recensions; all five manuscripts are currently held in Maulana Azad Library in Aligarh. Both major versions have five Ta'lims on non-Muslim religions and seven Ta'lims on Islamic sects. In the five devoted to the non-Muslim religions, one each is dedicated to the Parsi religion, Hinduism, Buddhism, Judaism and Christianity. The second Ta'lim is on Hinduism and other Indian sects; one section presents Sikh beliefs and practices.

The second ta'lim of Dabistan-i-Mazahib includes one of the oldest references to Nanakpanthis. This term is uncommon in the literature of Guru Nanak’s era, but it is attested in the writings of Miharban (d. 1640), a grandson of Guru Ram Das and one belonging to the Minas – one of the five splinter groups instructed by Guru Gobind Singh for the initiated Khalsa to avoid. Nanakpanthis as mentioned in the Dabistan-i-Mazahib are understood to be Sikhs of mid-17th-century who followed Guru Nanak.

Among the first details mentioned of the faith at the time is the author’s direct observation of the lack of belief in idols and idol-temples among the Sikhs of the time. It addition, it states that there is no veneration of mantras, idols, and avtars of the Hindus, nor is there regard of the Sanskrit language. And further on, an anecdote popular among the followers of Guru Hargobind, who had been the Guru around the time of the writing of the treatise, is relayed:

In short, after the Battle of Kartarpur he went to Phagwara. From there, since it was difficult for him to stay in any place near Lahore, he proceeded to Karaitpūr (Kiratpur) which is situated within the Punjab hills. That area belonged to Rāja Tārāchand, who did not pursue the path of allegiance and obedience to Emperor Shahjahan. The people of that area worshipped images. On the top of the mountain an image of a goddess, known as Naina Devi has been set up. Rājas and others from the territories around, going to that place, followed the custom of making a pilgrimage [to it]. When the Gurū settled himself there, a Sikh of his, Bhairū by name, going to the temple, broke the nose of the goddess. The Rājas got the news of it and complained to the Gurū, taking his [Bhairu's] name. The Gurū summoned Bhairū. Bhairū denied it. The Rājas' servants said, "We recognise this [man]." He replied, "O Rājas, ask the goddess. If she takes my name, you can kill me."The Rājas said, "Fool, how can the goddess speak?" Bhairū broke into laughter, saying, "One now knows who is the fool. When she cannot prohibit anyone from breaking her own head, and cannot identify the person who has attacked her, what good do you expect from her, and why do you worship her?" The Rajas were put to silence. Today most people from amongst the masses (ri'āyā) of that territory are the Gurū's followers.

The dietary laws of the Hindus, as well as their “austerities and worship” were also said to disregarded.

The Dabistan also states, "Nanak praised the religion of the Muselmans, as well as the avatars and divinities of the Hindus; but he knew that these objects of veneration were created and not creators, and he denied their real descent from heaven, and their union with mankind," described by the author as the doctrines of halool and ittehad.

According to Irfan Habib, the Dabistan-i-Mazahib states Guru Nanak practiced rituals of both Hindu and Muslims, which is in "apparent contrast" to the contemporary orthodox Sikh belief that he rejected all rituals; Habib also states that “from his verses in the Guru Granth Sahib too it is obvious that he rejected not only tiraths (pilgrimages), but also all “distinctive rituals.”” Further, all three surviving recensions of the older version of the Dabistan-i-Mazahib state that all Sikhs that the author of Dabistan had met, except one, believed that Baba Nanak was God. In the Dabistan, a Brahmgiani, or claimant to possession of divine knowledge, named Deva addressed the Guru as Parmeshwar; to account for this, Irfan Habib posits that by the time of Guru Arjan, a belief had taken root among Sikhs regarding Guru Nanak as having been a god, “for Deva to seize the chance of playing upon it.” The translation of the Persian term نا شمرد na-shumard (translated as “does not regard”) according to what Habib terms as the two “Version B” printed copies of the treatise, which translations like that of Ganda Singh were based upon, as opposed to بی شمرد bi-shumard (translated by Habib as “regards”) in the three “Version A” manuscripts, also attest to this belief. The Dabistan relays that during the time of Guru Arjan, “the Sikhs or disciples had become numerous and made exaggerations in their beliefs," though Guru Nanak “reckoned himself a slave [of God]” and described God as formless, “who is not a body and bodied and is not united with [material] body.”

Malhotra and Mir point out that the author of the Dabistan-i-Mazahib considers Guru Nanak’s compositions to be written “in Jataki, ‘the language of the Jats,’ who have no regard for the Sanskrit language.” The treatise also mentions that the Nanakpanthis regarded Udasis, or ascetic renouncers of the world, as well as another splinter group, as “not praiseworthy.” Banerjee describes the author as “liberal-minded and a friend of the Guru,” and as someone who “does not ‘misrepresent’ Guru Nanak’s character for sectarian motives,” though the challenge exists to “assess the historical value of traditional accounts which are infected by the ‘enthusiastic admiration’ of his ‘adherents',” applying this remark to all Sikh hagiographical writings. He goes on to say that “on the whole, Dabistan is of greater use as a clue to the seventeenth-century image of Guru Nanak than as a biographical narrative."

== Sikh traditions ==
According to Harnik Deol, during Sikh rule, an elite milieu of descendants of Guru lineages, holy men (babas, bhais, sants) and exegetes, particularly pujaris – for whom scholar Harjot Oberoi coined the term "Sanatan Sikhs" – provided ritual services and led functions for the burgeoning class of Sikh aristocrats and landed gentry, in return for generous endowments from this clientele. They included Sahajdhari Sikhs uninitiated into the Khalsa, with fundamental differences in the practices and doctrines with Khalsa Sikhs. This class gained control of Sikh shrines under the patronage of Sikh elites in the eighteenth century. They took to the worship of images and idols, not considering themselves bound by rahitnamas, the Sikh codes of conduct. The British colonial rulers, after annexing the Sikh Empire in mid-19th-century, continue to patronize and gift land grants to these mahants, thereby increasing their strength. Oberoi contends that the mahants and pujaris justified their position by asserting that while the role of guru, which served as sole intermediary between man and God, was for scripture alone in theory, in actual practice this was too abstract for the masses, who needed living functionaries to serve in that role.

Local congregations and reformers sought to purge this increasing entrenched Brahmanical priestly-mahant class. The Tat Khalsa accused the mahants of the Hinduization of Sikh customs and of increasingly prevalent idolatrous practices, as well as the housing of idols, pandits, astrologers, lumpen elements, and vices in which the mahants themselves partook in, while barring entry to even initiated low-caste Sikhs and ignoring the needs of the Sikh congregation. In 1905, they removed all idols from the Golden Temple, in accordance with Sikh orthodoxy.

According to a pujari based in the Golden Temple, the Raja of Chamba State had a metal casting of Guru Hargobind (1595–1644) given during the reign of Maharaja Ranjit Singh of the Sikh Empire in the 1800s, well after the period of the Sikh gurus. This would subsequently become one of the first large images to be placed as an idol in the temple. Later, a gilded image of the same guru, placed below the Akal Takht, and then a minor idol of Guru Nanak in the inner sanctum, would follow. Larger images would be housed in the neighboring Gurdwara Baba Atal. In the 1880s the temple management declined installing idols of all ten Sikh gurus at the temple's main entrance, as pujaris would come to situate themselves within the precincts of the temple with stone images, instructing pilgrims to worship before them.

=== Khalsa Sikhs ===
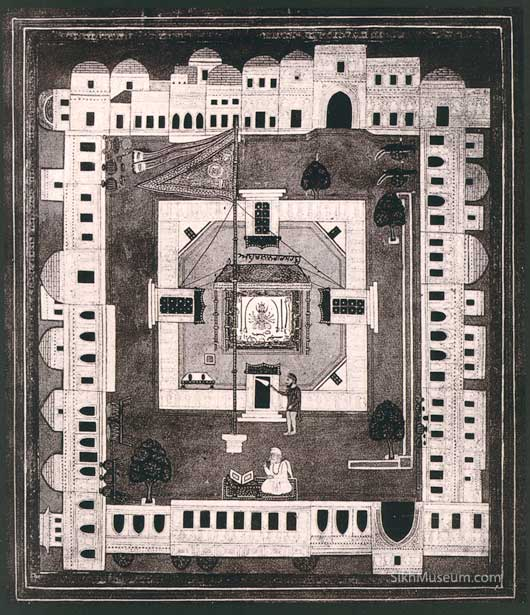
Overhead view of Takht Sri Hazoor Sahib Gurdwara complex, ca.1870. What appears to be an idol can be spotted in the sanctum sanctorum of the complex

The orthodox Sikhism of the Khalsa forbids idol worship, in accordance with the teachings of the Gurus. This remained the case during the time of the Gurus, until increased Mughal persecution in the eighteenth century forced the Khalsa to yield gurdwara control to mahants, or custodians, who often belonged to Udasi, Nirmala, or other Brahmanical-influenced ascetic heterodox sects, or were non-Sikh altogether. The Khalsa at this time engaged in guerilla warfare against the Mughals and the hill rajas of the Sivalik Hills allied to them, and later fought the Afghans and established themselves as local leaders, while mahant control of Gurdwaras continued into the nineteenth century. Such groups wrote exegeses while the Khalsa focused on political power at the time, as Sikh jathas solidified into the Sikh misls of the Dal Khalsa, which would establish the Sikh Empire.

The struggles of the Khalsa Sikhs elevated the Sikhs to new levels of political power never before experienced by the community, which had been persecuted for much of its existence and especially in preceding decades. The Khalsa, as they had raised arms against the state, had experienced heavy persecution by the Mughals, to the extent that for a period the Khalsa vacated the plains of Punjab, situating themselves in the refuges of the northern hilly areas adjoining Punjab, and in the desert areas to the south, from where they mounted further attacks. This created the opportunity for other less disruptive sects to gain control of Sikh institutions, due to their lack of external identifying features compared to the initiated Khalsa. The struggle for self-defense and political autonomy produced the misls and eventually the Sikh Empire, though in the midst of consolidating power in the face of Mughal and Afghan attacks, came at the expense of reestablishing direct control over Sikh institutions and the eroding of Sikh mores, a development that Khalsa would have to contend with when the Sikh Empire was lost to the British.

After the fall of the Sikh Empire, the Singh Sabha movement was begun in the 1870s to revitalize Sikh institutions that had deteriorated under the administration of the mahants, who had become increasingly corrupt and had introduced non-Sikh practices into the Gurdwaras. Khalsa Sikhs sought to establish a distinct Sikh identity and make some fundamentals of belief and behavior its basis. The Singh Sabha movement eventually brought the Khalsa back to the fore of Gurdwara administration, which they achieved after expelling the mahants and their corrupt practices, which included idolatry, financial malfeasance, Brahmanical privilege, and the dissemination of unsavory literature. The prohibition of idolatry in Sikhism, in accordance with Sikh scripture, was formalized in the 20th century after the revitalization of Sikh institutions led by the reformist Tat Khalsa of the Singh Sabha Movement of the late 19th-century, accepted as having the orthodox position by the Sikhs, in reaction to what was seen as Brahmanical Hindu interference in Sikh affairs, particularly of organizations like Arya Samaj and Brahmo Samaj, who were proselytizing in the area along with other religious factions like Christian missionaries and Muslim groups like the Ahmediyya, following the fall of the Sikh Empire. In 1905, the Sikh manager of the Harmandar Sahib ordered the removal of idols and the end of Hindu practices in the gurdwara in accordance with Sikh scripture, an order that was subsequently backed by the Tat Khalsa, upsetting the privileged, nationally hegemonic upper-caste Hindu orthodoxy. The Akali movement, fueled by incidents like the Nankana massacre, brought control of the Gurdwaras from the mahants back to mainstream Sikhs; the Shiromani Gurdwara Parbandhak Committee (SGPC), now manage Gurdwaras in accordance with mainstream Khalsa norms.

In the view of Arvind-Pal Singh Mandair, a professor of Sikh Studies, the Singh Sabha movement intellectuals in the late 19th and early 20th century, created exegetical works in their attempts to overcome idolatrous notions of God. This was the Singh Sabha's attempt to cleanse Sikhism of Hinduism, but Mandair alleges that they ended up admitting the “tiniest residue” of the practice and formulating new norms that did in a different way what they accused Hindus of doing in practice. According to Mandair, the Sikh scripture includes words such as "murat", "sarir" and "akal,” which, selectively read, can be viewed as teaching an abstract "formless" concept of God. However, states Mandair, other parts of the Sikh scripture include terms such as "murat" which relate to "form, shape" creating exegetical difficulty. Mandair posits that Khalsa writers of the Singh Sabha movement reinterpreted and gave new contextual meanings to the words such as "murat" in order to show that there is no inconsistency and contradiction in their exegetical attempts around idolatry in Sikhism. In response, historian and professor Gurdarshan Singh Dhillon calls Mandair’s own reading of the text “selective,” and as seeking "to make Guru Nanak’s monotheism redundant.” Dhillon sees Mandair's view as ignoring Guru Nanak’s own direct words regarding idolatry, and questions how qualities listed in the Mul Mantar could apply to an idol, “as the term “Akal Murat” takes its meaning not in isolation but from the total understanding of the Mul Mantar.” and that the terms “timeless,” and “Eternal Reality” cannot be applied to a physical idol. Mandair’s purpose is described as an effort “to connect Guru Nanak’s Time and World and then to idolatry, “tear[ing] words and terms out of context and twists their meaning to suit his contrived thesis.” Dhillon holds that Mandair’s inclination towards the McLeodian school of Sikh thought led to utilizing the Hegelian approach to produce ‘new knowledge formations’ to delegitimize Sikh interpretations of their own faith in order to serve “Hindu-centric and Christian-centric state models” by levelling regional identities in an attempt to overcome identity politics bolstered by the concepts of religion and regional political sovereignty.

=== Nirankari Sikhs ===
Among the earliest reform movements that strongly opposed idol worship practices in the Sikh community was the Nirankari sect started by Baba Dyal Das (1783–1855). The Nirankaris condemned the growing idol worship, obeisance to living gurus and influence of Brahmanic ritual that had crept into the Sikh Panth. Though not an initiated Khalsa, he urged Sikhs to return to their focus to a formless divine (nirankar) and described himself as a nirankari, He was opposed to all idol worship, including the then existing practice of keeping idols and pictures of the ten Sikh Gurus and praying before them. Maharaja Ranjit Singh of the Sikh Empire was said to have appreciated his teachings. He built a new Gurdwara in Rawalpindi (now in Pakistan), Dyal Das was opposed for his strict teachings by upper-caste Sikhs and had to shift his residence several times, eventually moving his reform movement into its suburbs. After the partition of British India along religious boundaries, the Nirankaris along with the vast majority of Sikhs chose to move to predominantly Hindu-majority India rather than stay in predominantly Muslim-majority Pakistan. Nirankaris moved their headquarters from Dayalsar in Rawalpindi to Chandigarh. Nirankaris were a potent and active campaigners in the late 19th century and early 20th century for the removal of all idols and images from the Golden Temple and other Gurdwaras.

His work was continued by various successors into the 20th century and eventually gained a following of several thousands. However, when they and an offshoot called the Sant Nirankari Mission eventually reverted to treating their leaders as living gurus or gods they came into conflict with mainstream Sikhs, especially in the late 1970s. Nirankaris have continued to campaign for the abolishment of idolatry like the orthodox Khalsa, but some offshoots continue to accept a living human guru beyond the ten gurus which has made them a heterodox sect of Sikhism. According to Jacob Copeman, Nirankaris revere Guru Nanak, but they also worship a living saint (satguru) as god.

=== Namdhari Sikhs ===
The Namdhari sect, also called Kuka, was founded as one of the Sikh revivalist movements during the late rule of Ranjit Singh, by Balak Singh in 1857. Its followers view Balak Singh as an incarnation of Guru Gobind Singh. They did not believe in any religious ritual other than the repetition of God's name (or nam, for which reason members of the sect are called Namdharis), including the worship of idols, graves, tombs, gods, or goddesses. The Namdharis had more of a social impact due to the fact that they emphasized Khalsa identity and the authority of the Guru Granth Sahib. They call their houses of worship as Dharamshala rather than Gurdwara, where they revere a living guru unlike Khalsa, and as such are considered as heretical by the orthodox Khalsa Sikhs.

The Namdharis do not subscribe to "Guru Maneyo Granth" against continued living guru lineages within the Sikh community. They believe it be an injunction in the 1925 SGPC Gurdwara Act to emphasize Guru Granth Sahib as the only extant Guru of the Sikhs, contradicting a supposed Namdhari belief that a "place of worship can only be a gurdwara when a living guru is seated" under the canopy of its sanctum, though they freely "attend the gurdwaras of other Sikhs," maintaining "family ties and friendships across sect boundaries." In Namdhari places of worship, if the living Guru is not present, Namdhari Sikhs place a picture of him on a raised platform of the sanctum. The devotion is then directed towards the icon of the living Guru.

=== Sanatan Sikhs ===
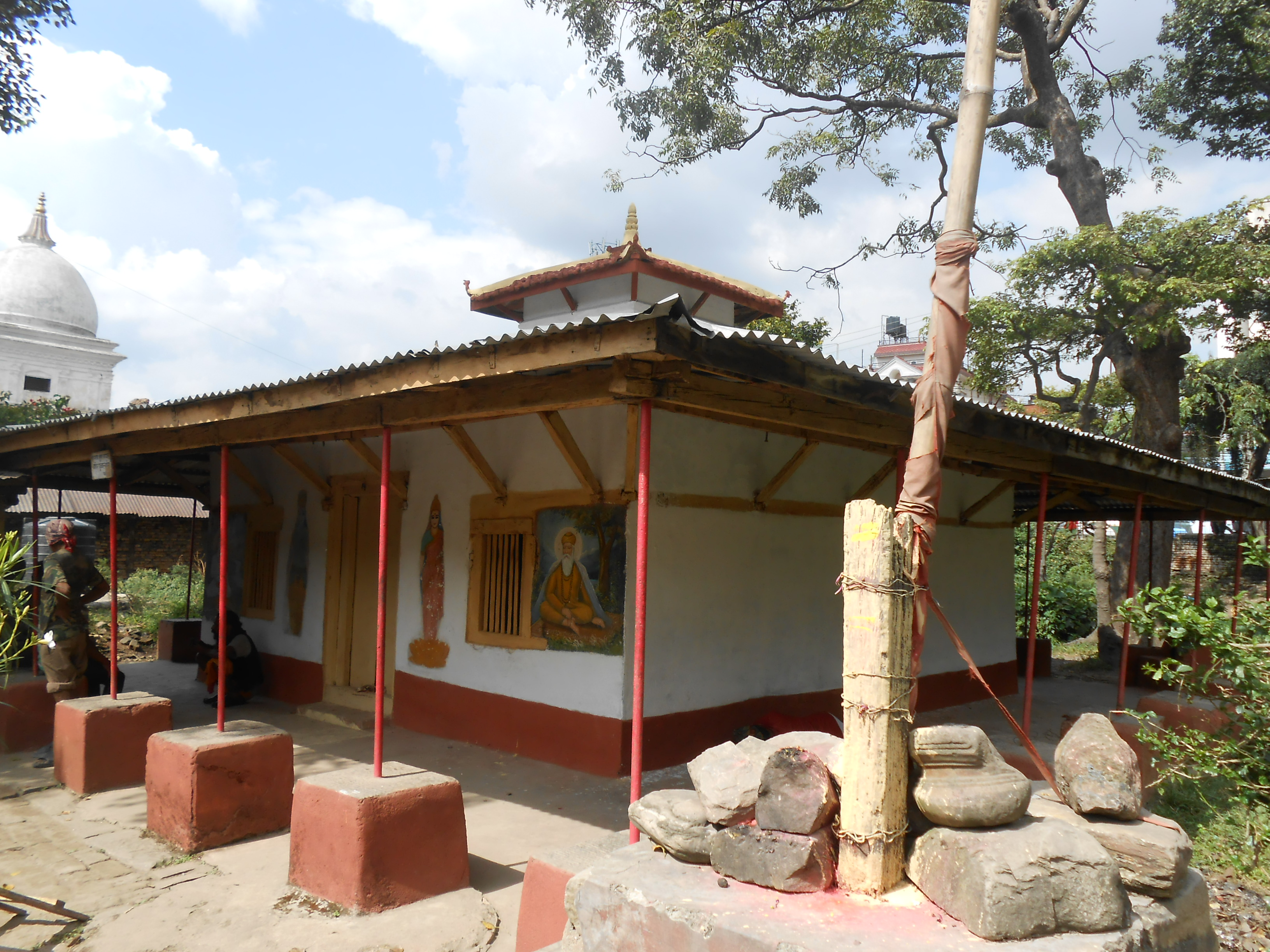
The Udasi Sikhs have been one of the sects of Sikhism that accept murti in temples, unlike the Khalsa Sikhs. Above: an Udasi shrine in Nepal with images.

The Sanatan Sikhs (lit. "Eternal Sikh," a term and formulation coined by Harjot Oberoi) were most prominent in the 1800s and identified with the Brahmanical social structure and caste system, and self-identified as Hindu. Not subscribing to the idea of the Guru Granth Sahib being the guru of the Sikhs, but allowing the worship of images, living gurus, and even "charismatic descendants" of the Sikh gurus, who devotees would be expected to show the same allegiance as that of "a subject and his ruler."

Led by Khem Singh Bedi – a direct descendant of Guru Nanak, Avtar Singh Vahiria and others were one of the major groups who competed to reform and define the Sikh identity in the late 19th century. The custom of this faction, which had emerging from the duality between initiated Khalsa and uninitiated Sehajdhari identities, was only as old as the late eighteenth century, in the post-Empire society where Khalsa Sikhism was no longer the universal norm. The Sanatan Sikhs had gained social prominence following Khalsa persecution and loss of institutional control in the 1700s, and guided the operations of Sikh gurdwaras in the pre-British 18th- and colonial-era 19th-century Punjab because of support from Sikh elites and later the colonial British empire. They were also the significant molders and primary participants among the rural masses of Sikh population.

In contrast to Nirankari, Namdhari, and Khalsa Sikhs, Sanatan Sikhs considered images and idols of the ten Sikh gurus, as well as others, to be an inclusive practice and acceptable means of devotional worship. According to Tony Ballantyne, the Sanatan Sikhs were spiritually sympathetic to the worship of idols and images, rural traditions and to respecting Hindu scriptures. Their views have been dismissed by the vast majority of Sikh scholars, and labeled and shunned as "Hindu saboteurs" and of being "conspiratorial".

Scholars such as Eleanor Nesbitt state the Nanaksar Gurdwaras practice of offering food cooked by Sikh devotees to the Guru Granth Sahib, as well as curtaining the scripture during this ritual, as a form of idolatry. Baba Ishar Singh of this international network of Sikh temples has defended this practice because he states that the Sikh scripture is more than paper and ink.

== Bibliolatry ==
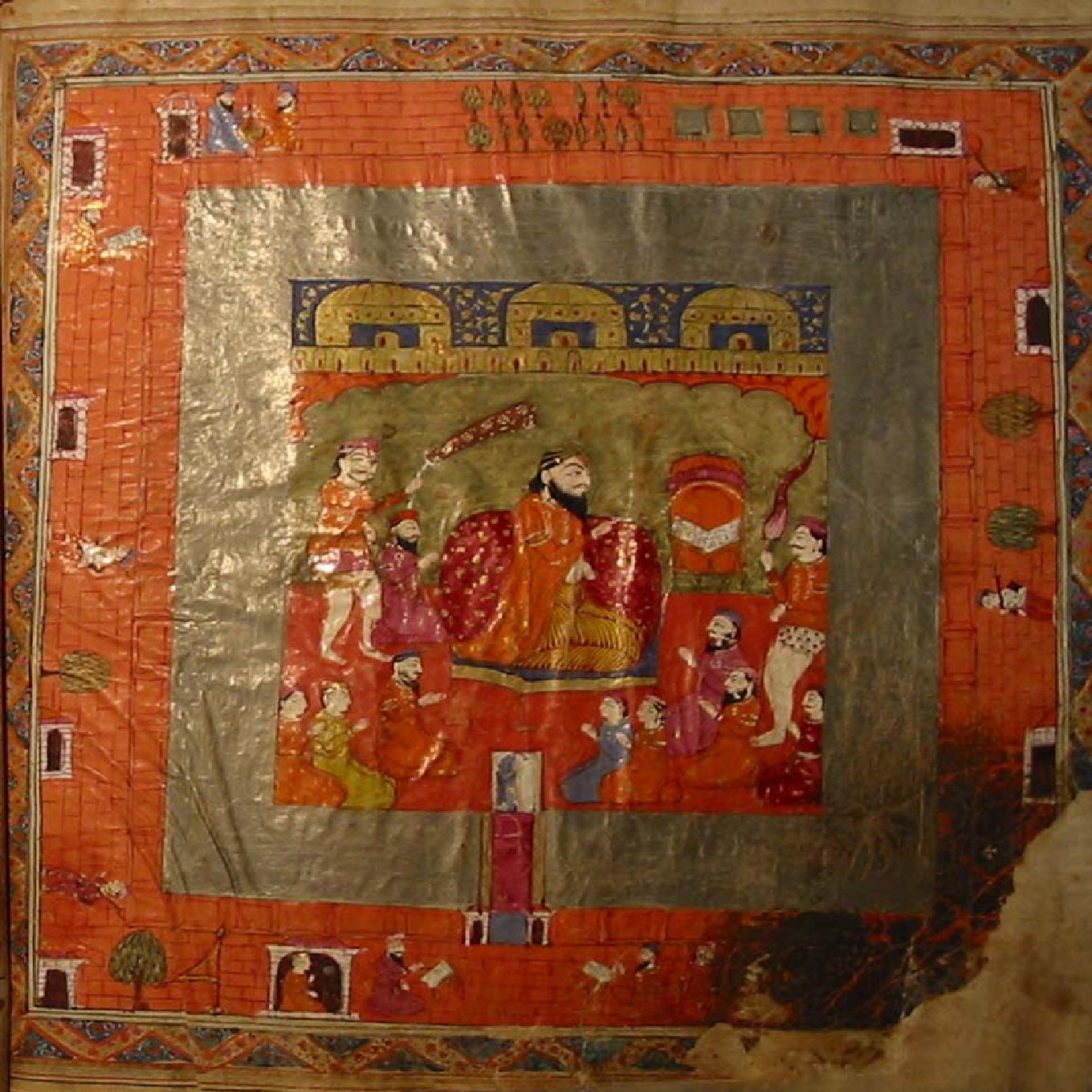
Depiction of the Guru Granth from a Guru Granth Sahib manuscript on Kashmiri paper, Patiala

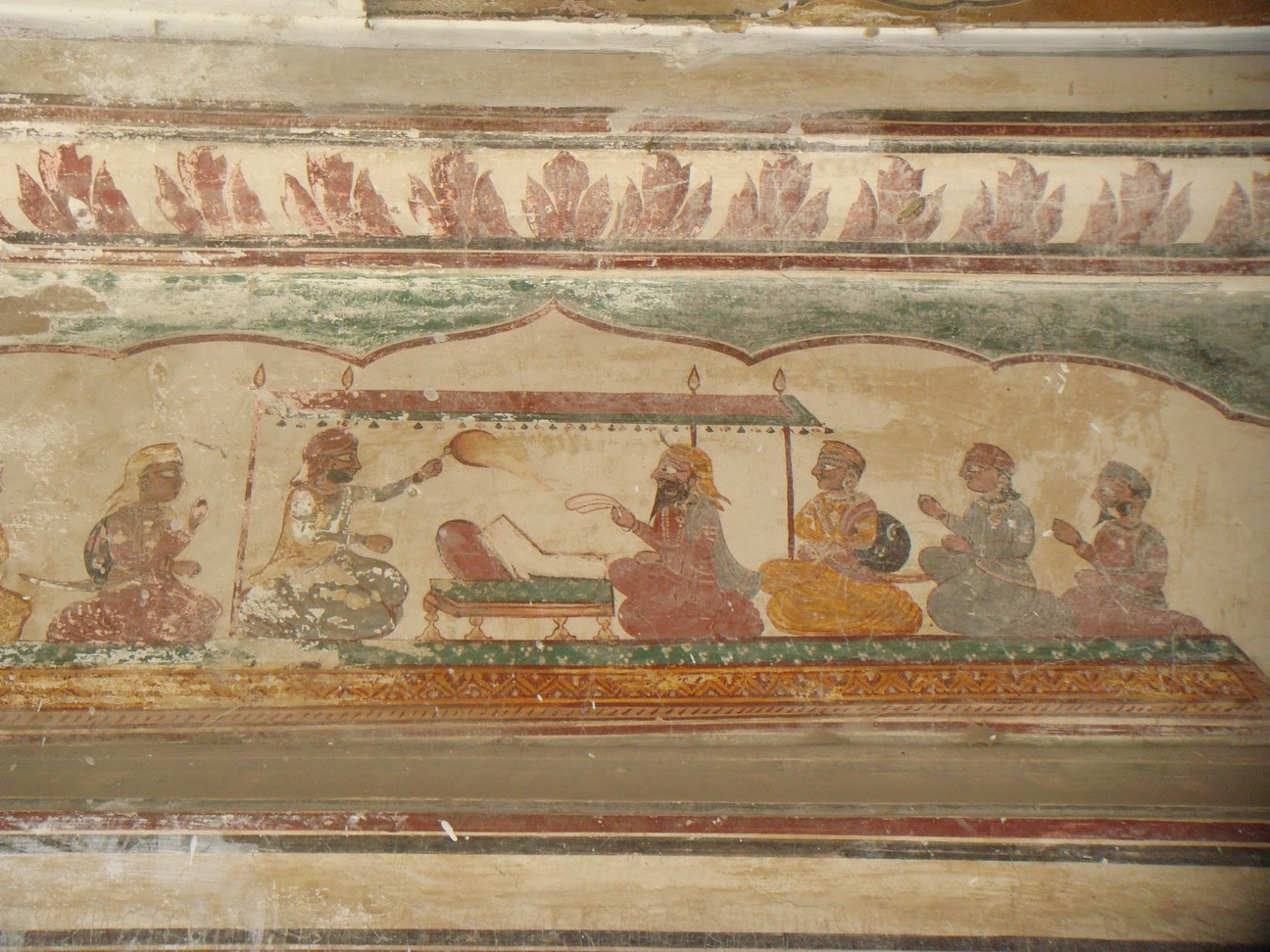
Prakash of the Guru Granth Sahib, fresco from Gurdwara Bhumman Shah

The daily routine of the gurdwara includes the prakash, which involves carrying the Sikh scripture, the Guru Granth Sahib, in a small procession of granthis, or gurdwara religious officials, placing it on a stand, unwrapping it, and opening it to be read; and the sukhasan, when the scripture is retired at the end of the day to a designated room, or sachkhand.

English travellers to Sikh temples during the early 1900s saw the veneration of the Granth as coming close to defeating the purpose of Guru Nanak's reforms (away from external authority to living experience), and saw it as a warning to Christian Protestants to avoid lapsing into bibliolatry, as Hindu temple idol worship served as a warning to Catholics.

The Arya Samaj, opponents of the Sikhs who themselves opposed idolatry, attempted to assert that many Sikhs accepted idols and their worship within Sikh temples, unlike Khalsa Sikhs who strongly opposed the practice. While conceding that Sikhs did not worship idols, Swami Dayanand, the founder of the Arya Samaj Hindu reform movement of the 1800s and critic of Sikhism, attempted to link veneration of the Guru Granth Sahib with idolatrous practices, based on his understanding of the Sikh faith. Dayanand Saraswati – the founder of the missionary Arya Samaj movement in the 1800s who interpreted Hinduism as originally a non-idolatrous monotheistic religion, considered Sikhism as one of the cults of Hinduism, even though this belief had no basis in reality. Like Hindus who he called as "degenerate, idolatrous", he criticized the Sikhs for worshipping the Guru Granth Sahib scripture as an idol like a mithya (false icon). Just like foolish Hindus who visit, bow, sing and make offerings in Hindu temples to symbols of goddess, said Saraswati, foolish Sikhs visit, bow, sing and make gifts in Sikh gurdwaras to the symbolic Sikh scripture. He condemned both the Hindus and the Sikhs as idolators, stating that while "it is true they do not practise idolatry," he saw the Sikhs of the time as worshipping the Guru Granth Sahib even more than idols.

According to Kristina Myrvold, every Sikh scripture copy is treated like a person and venerated with elaborate ceremonies. However, according to Kristina Myrvold, these rituals are a daily means of "merit bestowing ministrations". These daily ritual ministrations and paying of homage for the scripture by Sikhs, states Myrvold, is not unique to Sikhism. This form of homage to God is also present in Islam, where the kabba (Mecca) is believed to be the house of God and visited by millions of Muslims every year. It moulds "meanings, values and ideologies" and creates a framework for congregational worship, states Myrvold, that is found in all major faiths.

== See also ==
- Deity
- Icon
- Murti
- Sects of Sikhism
- Sikhism and Hinduism
- Sikhism and Jainism
