= Guru Maneyo Granth =

Historic statement of the 10th Sikh Guru, Guru Gobind Singh

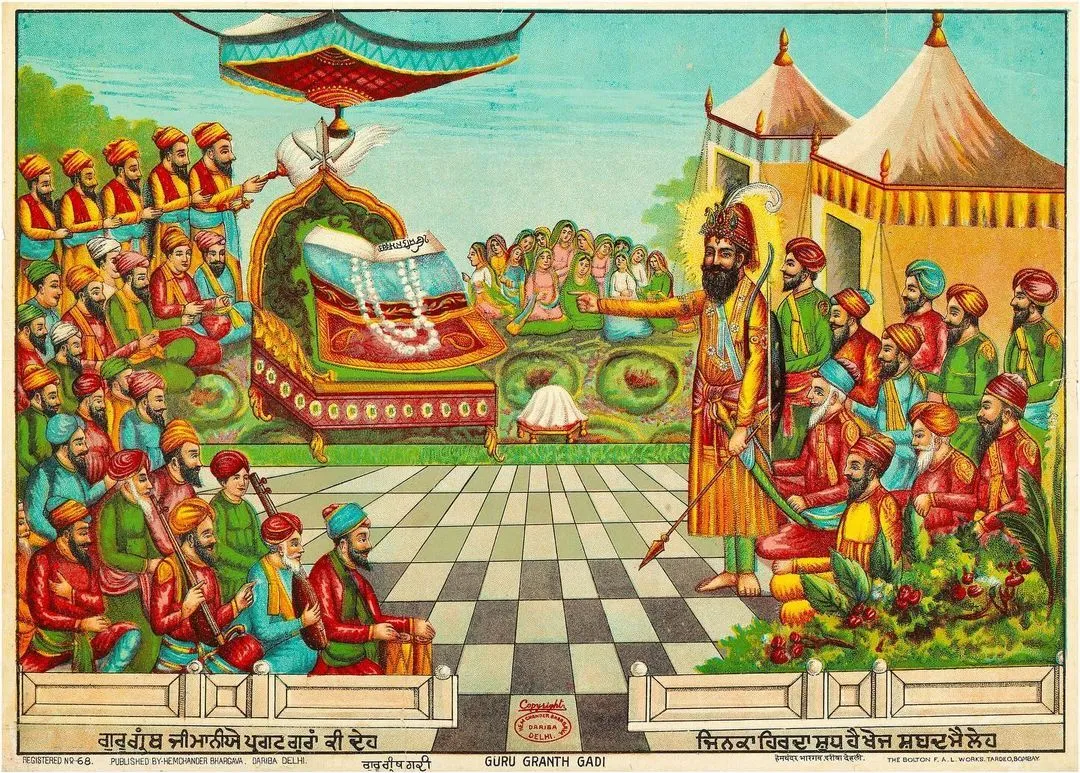
Painting of Guru Gobind Singh anointing the Adi Granth as the eternal "Guru" of the Sikhs, circa 1900

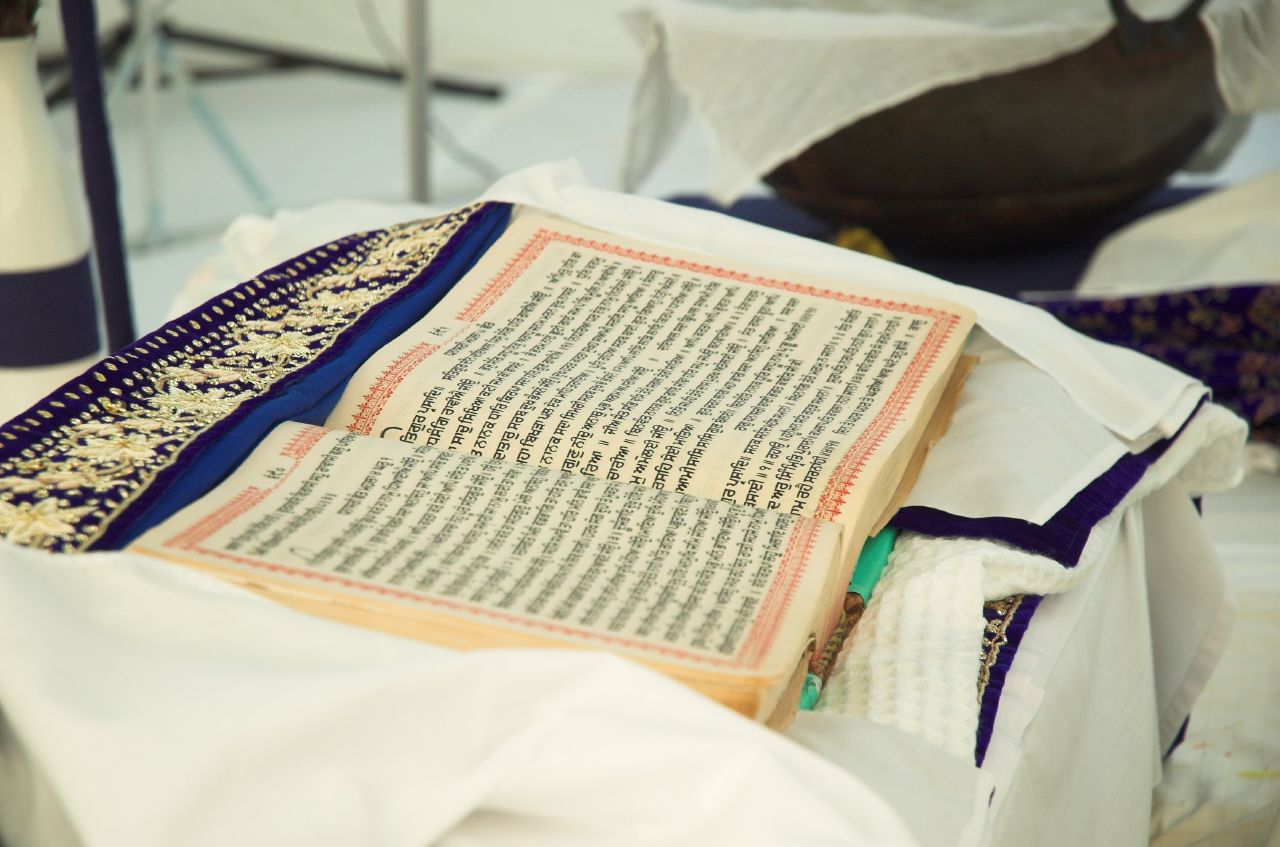
With his words "Guru Maneyo Granth," Sri Guru Gobind Singh installed the Adi Granth as the Sri Guru Granth Sahib as the eternal Sikh Guru.

Guru Maneyo Granth (Gurmukhi: ਗੁਰੂ ਮਾਨਿਓ ਗ੍ਰੰਥ or ਗੁਰੂ ਮਾਨਯੋ ਗ੍ਰੰਥ, gurū mānio granth) refers to the historic statement of the 10th Sikh Guru, Guru Gobind Singh (1666–1708) shortly before his demise on affirming the sacred scripture Adi Granth as his successor, thereby terminating the line of human Gurus. Installed as the Guru Granth Sahib, it is now the central holy scripture of Sikhism, and the eternal living Guru of all Sikhs. It is central to Sikh worship as it is said to imbibe the one light of the creator manifested in the Ten Sikh Gurus‐one spirit in ten forms.

The event on 20 October 1708 at Nanded (in present-day Maharashtra), when Guru Gobind Singh installed Adi Granth as the Guru of Sikhism, was recorded in a Bhatt Vahi (a bard's scroll) by an eyewitness, Narbud Singh, and is now celebrated as Gurgaddi (Guru Gaddi Divas). Guru Gobind Singh's statement is part of the central chant "Sabh Sikhan ko Hukam Hai, Guru Maneyo Granth." October 2008 marked the tercentenary year of Guruship of Guru Granth Sahib and was marked by major celebrations by Sikhs worldwide. Nanded especially saw yearlong celebrations the same year at Takht Sri Hazur Sahib.

== Adi Granth to Guru Granth Sahib ==
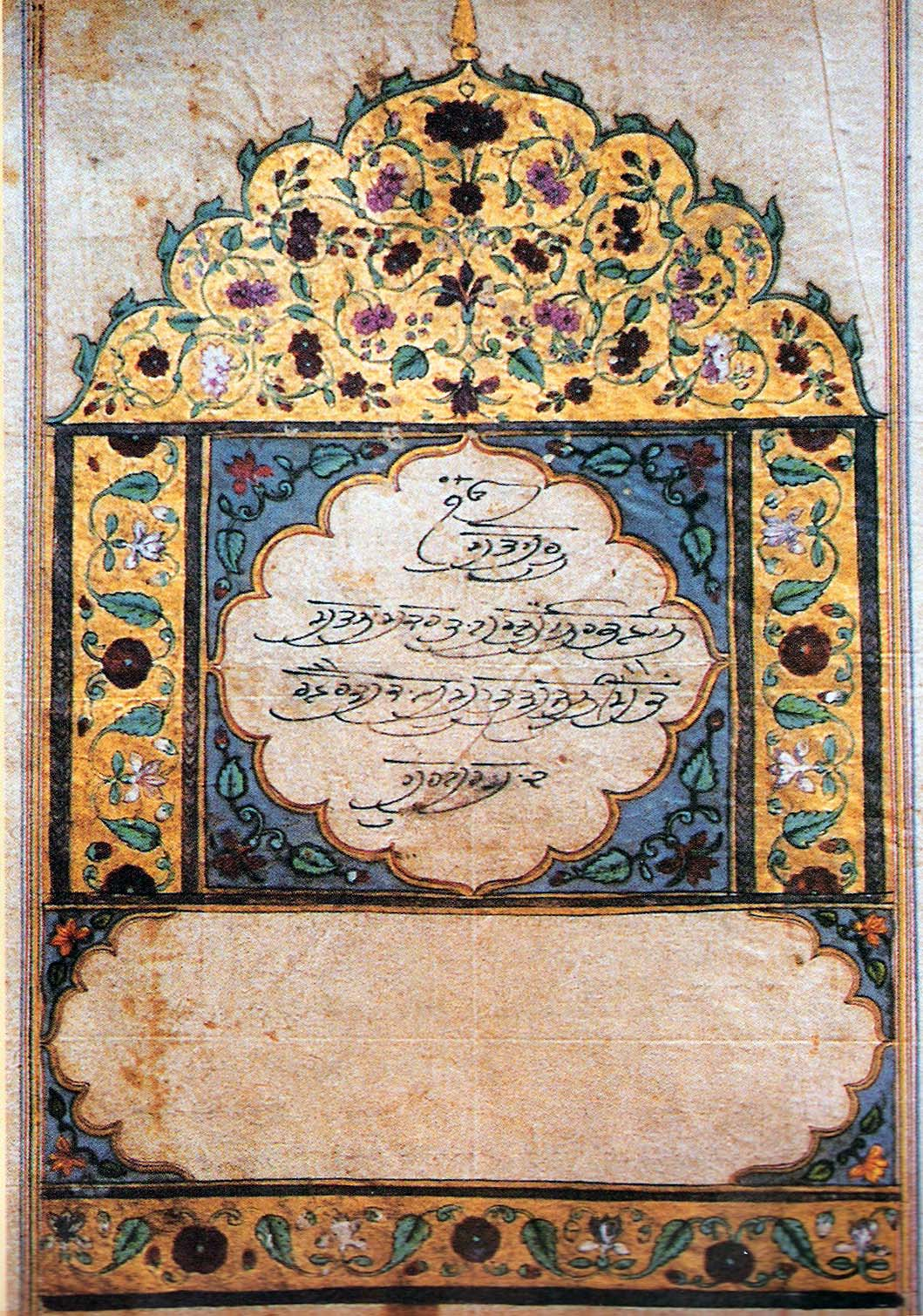
Illuminated Adi Granth folio with the seal of Guru Gobind Singh. The manuscript is of the Lahore recension, late 17th to early 18th century.

ਸੱਬ ਸਿੱਖਣ ਕੋ ਹੁਕਮ ਹੈ ਗੁਰੂ ਮਾਨਯੋ ਗ੍ਰੰਥ
Sab sikhan kō hukam hai gurū mānyō granth
All Sikhs are commanded to take the Granth as Guru.

— Guru Gobind Singh, October, 1708, Nanded

The composition of the sacred Granth contains renderings of the hymns (bani) of six Sikh Gurus (from Guru Nanak to Guru Arjun as well as the ninth Guru, Guru Tegh Bahadur) of the Sikh faith along with fifteen Bhagats, eleven Bhatts, and three Gursikhs (Bhai Sundar Ji, Bhai Satta Ji, Bhai Balwand Ji). It was composed in this form in the year 1604 with the later addition of Guru Tegh Bahadur's bani (sacred compositions). Its blessings are sought by the true seeker with a devout heart. The Sikh religion sincerely believes that in each of the succeeding Gurus the spirit, the light of God which manifested in Guru Nanak, was operating and passed on to the next Sikh Guru. Guru Ram Das says in the Siri Guru Granth Sahib, "Waho Waho Satgur Nirankar Hai, Jis Ant Na Paravar," meaning, "The Lord descends in this world in the form of the Formless True Guru, but only some rare soul/devotee is able to recognise him." (SGGS, Ang 1421)

Even before the installation of the scripture to guruship, the scripture was revered and respected by the Sikhs. When it was first installed in the Darbar Sahib in Amritsar in 1604 on a manji (cot) on a canopied, high pedestal with a fly-whisk attendant (chowri), Guru Arjan bowed to the work and sat at a level lower than it. Thus, the scripture was treated in the same respect as the guru even before its guruship proclamation by Guru Gobind Singh.

The sacred Granth is installed in all Sikh holy places of worship and treated as the presiding presence of the Guru, an embodiment of Divine Truth. The devotees of the sangat or congregation gather in solemn assembly to pray and seek the blessings of the Supreme. This comes through in the mystical wisdom contained within the words of Gurbani and it stands for realization of the Truth. The Gurus' word, called shabad, is taken as the mystic experience of the Guru.

In the words of Bhai Gurdas, a great scholar of the Guru's time, "In the word is the Guru, and the Guru is in the word (shabad). In other words, the human body was not the Guru, but the light of the word (shabad) within the heart was their real personality." When the human mind dives deeper and deeper into the Guru's word, all mental impurities depart and the wisdom of the Guru permeates the human soul. As a result, the devotee attains the divine light and wisdom which leads him to contemplate and meditate on God's name (Naam). In light of the above realities, the Sikh religion makes the holy Granth the living master of the Sikh Panth.

Before Guru Gobind Singh, the tenth Guru, left his human body, he conferred the Guruship to the [Adi Granth]. He then delivered a self-composed hymn:

- Agya bhai Akal ki tabhi chalayo Panth. Sabh Sikhan ko hukam hai Guru manyo Granth. Guru Granth Ji manyo pargat Guran ki deh.

Jo Prabhu ko milo chahe khoj shabad mein le. Raj karega Khalsa aqi rahei na koe, Khwar hoe sabh milange bache sharan jo hoe."

- Translation:

"Under the order of the Immortal, the Path was created. All Sikhs are ordered to accept the Granth as their Guru.

Consider the Guru Granth as an embodiment of the Gurus. Those who want to meet the Lord, can find Him in its hymns. The Pure shall rule, and no rebels will exist, The areas and people who are missing will be reunited, those who take refuge in it will be saved."

He also offered his obeisance to the sacred Granth, thus conveying his Light to it. This historic development which took place in October 1708 ensured that the order of the Khalsa brotherhood always remained an abiding force for Sikh Panth unity.

As per the contemporary Bhatt Vahis, the guruship was passed onto the scripture in the following manner:

Guru Gobind Singh, the Tenth Prophet, son of Guru Tegh Bahadur, grandson of Guru Hargobind, great-grandson of Guru Arjan, of the family of Guru Ram Das, Surajbansi Gosal clan, Sodhi Khatri resident of Anandpur, Parganah Kahlur, now at Nander, in the Godavari country, in the Deccan, asked Bhai Daya Singh, on Buddhvar [Wednesday] Katik chauth, shukla pakkh, samvat 1765 [6 October 1708] to fetch Sri Granth Sahib. In obedience to his orders, Daya Singh brought the Granth Sahib. The Guru placed before it five paise and a coconut and bowed his head before it. He said to the congregation, 'It is my commandment: own Sri Granth Ji in my place. Whosoever acknowledges it thus will obtain her/his reward. The Guru will rescue that Sikh. Know this as the truth.'

— Bhatt author, Bhatt Vahi Talauda Parganah Jind, English translation found in 'Sikhism: An Introduction' (2011) Nikky-Guninder Kaur Singh
