= Ik Onkar =

Religious phrase in Sikhism

Ik Onkār, a Sikh symbol (encoded as a single character in Unicode at U+0A74, ੴ)

Ik Onkar (Note: Also spelled Ek Onkar or Ik Oankaar (Gurmukhi: ੴ or ਇੱਕ ਓਅੰਕਾਰ; Punjabi pronunciation: [ɪkː oːəŋkaːɾᵊ]; alternate spellings like Ik Ong Kar and Ek Ong Kar also exist; literally, "one God", hence interpreted as "There is only one God or one Creator.")) (ੴ) is a phrase in Sikhism that denotes the one supreme reality. It is a central tenet of Sikh religious philosophy.

Ik Onkar are the first words of the Mul Mantar and also the opening words of the Sikh holy scripture Guru Granth Sahib.

Ik (ਇੱਕ) is interpreted as "one and only one, who cannot be compared or contrasted with any other", the "unmanifest, Lord in power, the holy word, the primal manifestation of the Godhead by which and in which all live, move and have their being and by which all find a way back to Absolute God, the Supreme Reality."

Ik Onkar has a distinct spelling in the Gurmukhi script and the phrase is found in many Sikh religious scriptures and inscribed in places of worship such as gurdwaras. Some Sikh flags are decorated with the Ik Onkar glyph.

== In Mul Mantar ==
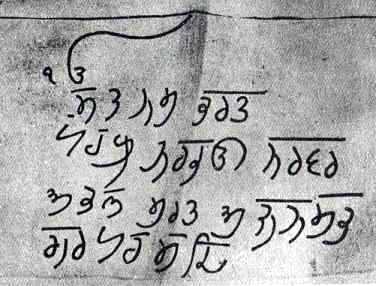
Mul Mantar written by Guru Har Rai, showing the Ik Onkar at top.

Ik Onkar is also the opening phrase of the Mul Mantar, present as opening phrase in the Guru Granth Sahib, and the first composition of Guru Nanak and the final salok is by Guru Angad. Further, the Mul Mantar is also at the beginning of the Japji Sahib, followed by 38 hymns and a final Salok by Guru Angad at the end of this composition.

ੴ ਸਤਿ ਨਾਮੁ ਕਰਤਾ ਪੁਰਖੁ ਨਿਰਭਉ ਨਿਰਵੈਰੁ ਅਕਾਲ ਮੂਰਤਿ ਅਜੂਨੀ ਸੈਭੰ ਗੁਰ ਪ੍ਰਸਾਦਿ ॥ ਜਪੁ।। ਆਦਿ ਸਚੁ ਜੁਗਾਦਿ ਸਚੁ ਹੈ ਭੀ ਸਚੁ।। ਨਾਨਕ ਹੋਸੀ ਭੀ ਸਚੁ।।

(Ik Oankaar Sati nāmu karatā purakhu nirabha'u niravairu akāla mūrati ajūnī saibha gura prasādi. Japu.. Ādi sacu jugādi sacu hai bhī sacu.. Nānaka hōsī bhī sacu...)

Translation:

This Being is one, truth by name, creator, fearless, without hatred, of timeless form, unborn, self-existent, and known by the Guru's grace.

== Description ==
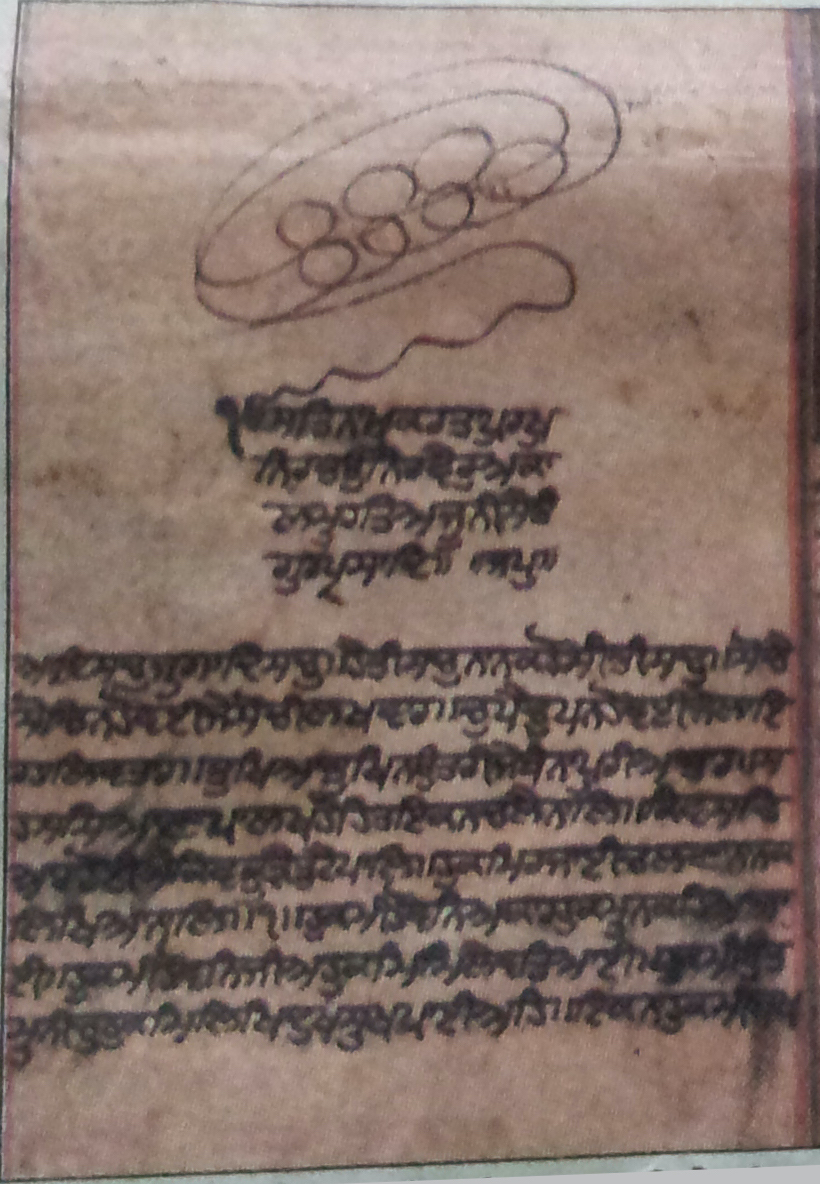
300-year-old Guru Granth Sahib manuscript found in a village of Maharashtra. The Ik Onkar (ੴ) written calligraphically is notable

Ik Onkar is the statement of oneness in Sikhism, that is 'there is one God'. Literally, it means 'One, whose expression emerges as Word'.

According to Wendy Doniger, the phrase is a compound of ik ("one" in Punjabi) and onkar, canonically understood in Sikhism to refer to the "absolute monotheistic unity of God". Etymologically, the word onkar denotes the sacred sound "Om" or the absolute in a number of Indian religions. Nevertheless, Sikhs give it an entirely different meaning. Pashaura Singh writes that "the meaning of Oankar in the Sikh tradition is quite different in certain respects from the various interpretations of this word in the Indian philosophical traditions", and the Sikhs "rather view Oankar as pointing to the distinctively Sikh theological emphasis on the ineffable quality of God, who is described as 'the Person beyond time,' the Eternal One, or 'the One without form'." Onkar is, according to Wazir Singh, a "variation of Om (Aum) of the ancient Indian scriptures (with a slight change in its orthography), implying the seed-force that evolves as the universe." Guru Nanak wrote a poem entitled Oankar in which, states Doniger, he "attributed the origin and sense of speech to the Divinity, who is thus the Om-maker."

Oankar ('One, whose expression emerges as the primal sound') created Brahma. Oankar fashioned the consciousness. From oankar came mountains and ages. Oankar produced the Vedas. By the grace of oankar, people were saved through the divine word. By the grace of oankar, they were liberated through the teachings of the Guru.

— Ramakali Dakkhani, Adi Granth 929–930, Translated by Pashaura Singh

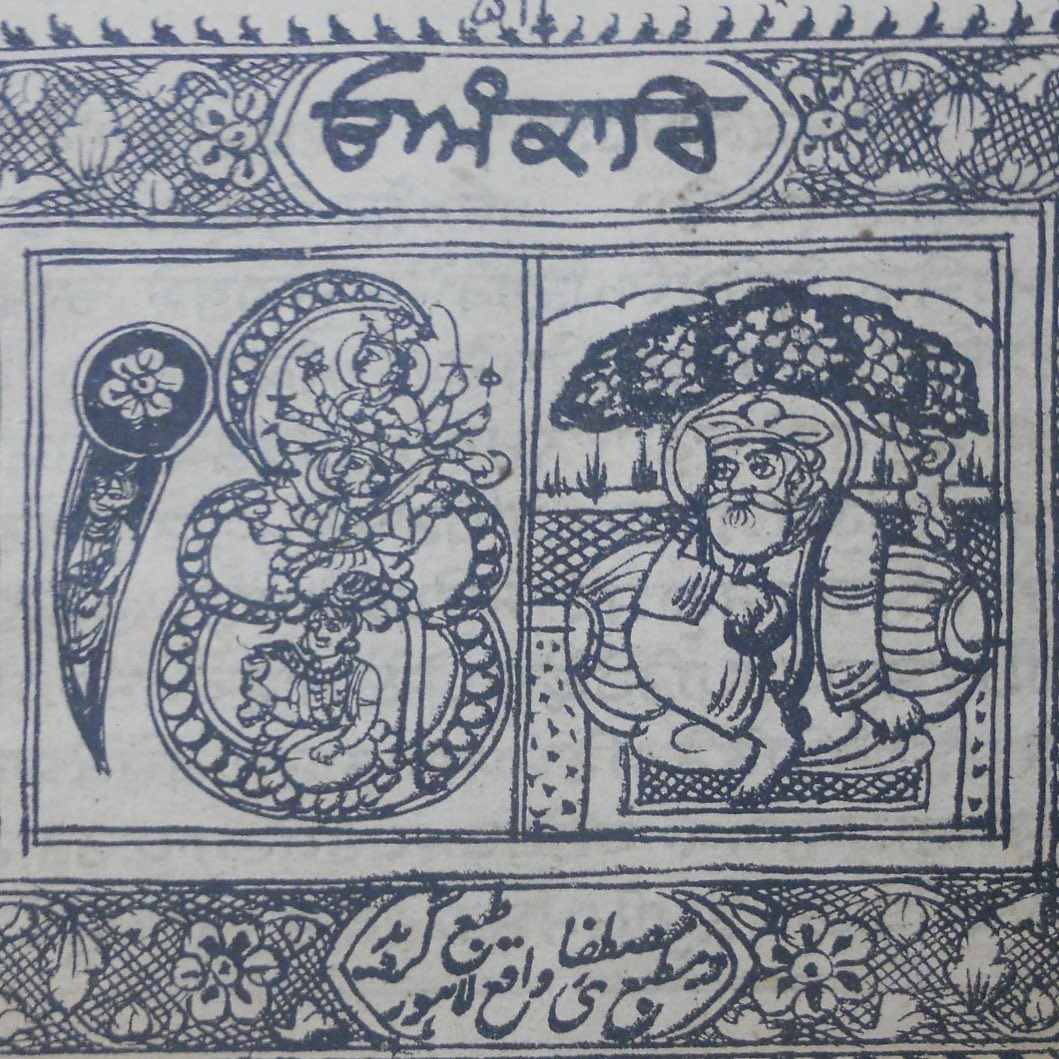
Artwork from a folio of a Janamsakhi manuscript explaining the meaning of Ik Onkar using a traditional theory, involving symbolism from Indic deities

Pashaura Singh goes on to state,

"By beginning with 'One,' Guru Nanak emphasizes the singularity of the Divine. That is, the numeral '1' affirms that the Supreme Being is one without a second, the source as well as the goal of all that exists. That is quite evident from the following statement: 'My Master (Sahib) is the One. He is the One, brother, and He alone exists' (AG 350). In a particularly striking instance, Guru Arjan employs the cognates of the Punjabi word ikk ('One') five times in a single line of his Asa hymn to make an emphatic statement of oneness of the Supreme Being: 'By itself the One is just One, One and only One, and the One is the source of all creation.'

He also considers the process of reification of the concept of Ik Oankar as having begun with the writings of Guru Nanak and Guru Arjan themselves, with the numeral ੧ (one) as emphasising the unity of Akal Purakh in monotheistic terms.

Other common terms for the one supreme reality alongside Ik Oankar, dating from the Gurus' time include the most commonly used term, Akal Purakh, "Eternal One," in the sense of Nirankar, "the One without form," and Waheguru ("Wonderful Sovereign").

== Depictions ==
In 2019, Air India launched a direct flight from London to Amritsar with the phrase Ik Onkar printed in golden colour with a red background, on the tail of a Boeing 787 Dreamliner. The plane was launched ahead of and in honour of the 550th anniversary of Guru Nanak’s birth.

The Gurmukhi symbol ੴ is registered under just three TLDs as verisign supports gurmukhi letters in these TLDs: ੴ.com, ੴ.net and ੴ.cc.

== See also ==
- Tawhid
- Waheguru
- Om
