= Waheguru =

Term used for God in Sikhism

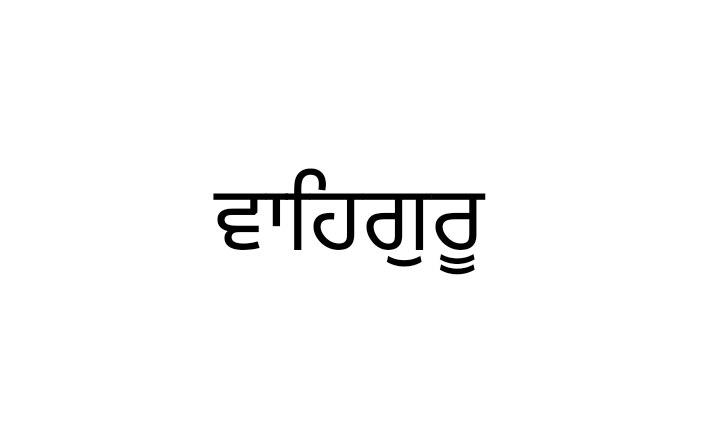
The primary Sikh term for God, "Waheguru", written in Gurmukhi script

Waheguru (Punjabi: ਵਾਹਿਗੁਰੂ, romanized: vāhigurū (Note: The term is also romanized as Vahiguru, Vaheguru, Vahiguroo, Waheguroo, amid others.), pronunciation: [ʋaːɦɪɡuɾuː], literally meaning "Wow Guru", figuratively translated to mean "Wonderful God" or "Wonderful Lord") is a term used in Sikhism to refer to God as described in Guru Granth Sahib. It is the most common term to refer to God in modern Sikhism.

== Meaning ==
The meaning of the word vāhigurū (usually spelled in English as Waheguru) is traditionally explained as vāh 'wondrous!' (Punjabi word analogous to "wow" in English), and guru, Sanskrit for 'teacher, spiritual guide, God', which taken together are said to carry the meaning, 'Wondrous Lord'. It is built upon an expression of awe and amazement of the divine. Another explanation for the term's meaning is that it refers to a great instructor who takes away the darkness from their pupil and enlightens them.

Waheguru is described and envisioned as a formless and omnipresent deity by Sikhs with whom a devotee is able to establish a personal relationship with by following the teachings of the Sikh Gurus. Waheguru is considered to be ultimate goodness, into which the purified soul merges whilst evil is vanquished.

== History ==
The hymns to Waheguru contained in Guru Granth Sahib have been composed by Bhatt Gayand. Gurmukhs meditated on the glyphs used to write Waheguru, explicitly ਵ, ਹ, ਗ, and ਰ, with this set of four characters originally being called Gurmukhi, later the term's meaning expanded to include the entire Gurmukhi script. A golden mohur, known as a butki, issued by the Lahore Mint of the Sikh Empire from 1828 onwards features Waheguru inscribed thrice over in Gurmukhi.

== Usage ==
The word is also used in Sikhism as a main mantra and is called gurmantra or gurmantar.

"The world is a garden, Waheguru its gardener.

Cherishing all, none is neglected;

From all comes the fragrance put there by Waheguru––

By such fragrance is each known."

— 'Sourcebook of the World's Religions: An Interfaith Guide to Religion and Spirituality' (2011) by Joel Beversluis, page 94

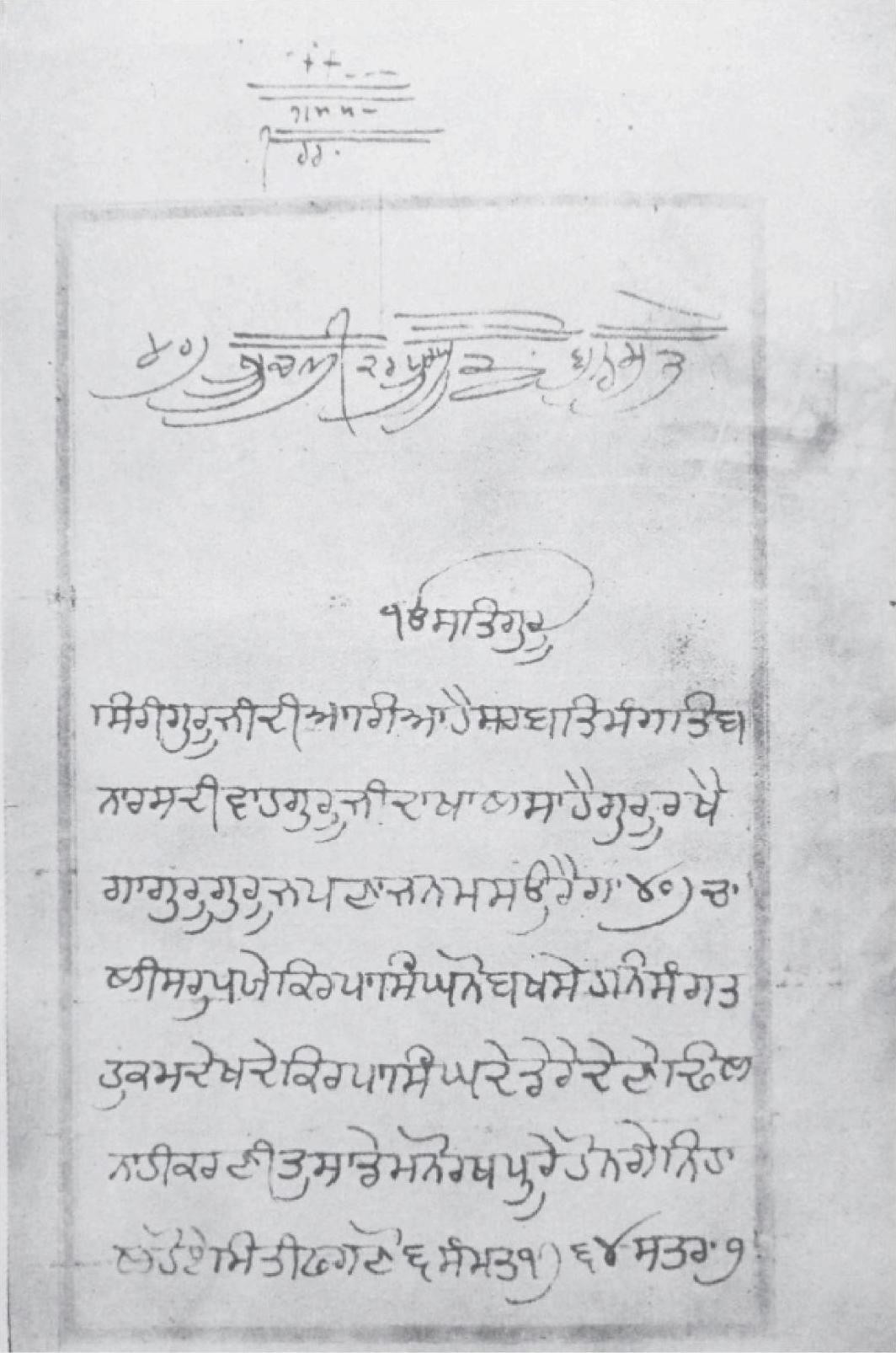
Hukamnama edict of Guru Gobind Singh addressed to the congregation ["sangat"] of Varanasi, dated 3 February 1708. The congregation is addressed as "Vaheguru ji ka Khalsa" and not as "my Khalsa" or "the Guru's Khalsa".

The term also finds usage in the jaikara (battle cry), greeting, and parting phrase introduced by Guru Gobind Singh: "Waheguru Ji Ka Khalsa Waheguru Ji Ki Fateh" (translated as 'the Khalsa belongs to God and victory belongs to God'). This phrase is used in the Amrit Sanchar ceremony, the Sikh baptismal ritual for initiation into the Khalsa order.

== See also ==
- Akal Purakh
- Ik Onkar
- Guru Gobind Singh
- God in Sikhism
- Mul Mantar
- Khalsa
