= Sarav viāpak =

Omnipresence of God in Sikhism

In Sikhism, Sarav viāpak (ਸਰਵ ਵਿਆਪਕ; literally "all-prevading god") is the omnipresence of God; since Sikhs hold God to be without form, shape, colour, gender, etc., they see God as present in every living being in the Universe. In order to witness the divine, humanity must turn inward as per Sikh theology. This can be accomplished via meditative practices. Thus, the divinity of the world can be fully experienced and witnessed by the spiritually adept.

Sikhism holds that creation is neither ex nihilo nor from materials lying outside God; it is the result of divine self-revelation by God. God has revealed or manifested himself in the form of the world. But God's being is not exhausted in this world alone, it goes beyond this world.

In Sikhism, creation is fully real. Because God is real, and the world is the expression of God, it follows that the world is also fully real.
