= Nand Singh (saint) =

Sikh saint

Sant Baba Nand Singh
- ਸੰਤ ਬਾਬਾ ਨੰਦ ਸਿੰਘ ਜੀ
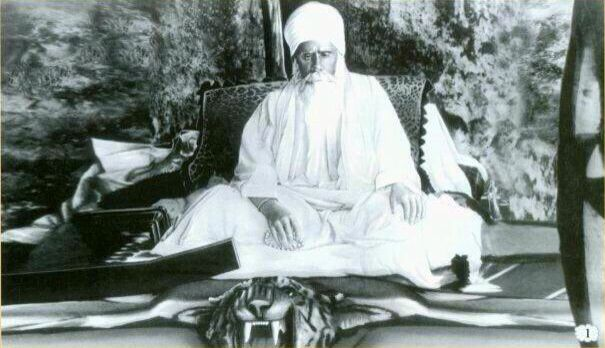

Head of Nanaksar Kaleran sect
- Preceded by: Position established (founder)
- Succeeded by: Baba Isher Singh

Personal life
- Born: 8 November 1870 Sherpur, Punjab, British India
- Died: 29 August 1943 (aged 72) Nanaksar, Punjab, British India
- Parents: Sardar Jai Singh (father); Mata Sada Kaur (mother)

Religious life
- Religion: Sikhism
- Sect: Nanaksari

Sant Baba Nand Singh (8 November 1870 – 29 August 1943) was a Sikh Saint. He is known as the founder of the Nanaksar Kaleran sampradya (Nanaksari sect) of Sikhism.

== Early life ==
Baba Nand Singh was born on 8 November 1870 at Sherpur village in Jagraon, Ludhiana district of Punjab to Sardar Jai Singh and Mata Sada Kaur. It is reported that he displayed a proclivity for meditation from a young age, once being found doing so while sitting at the edge of a well in the middle of the night.

== Life work ==
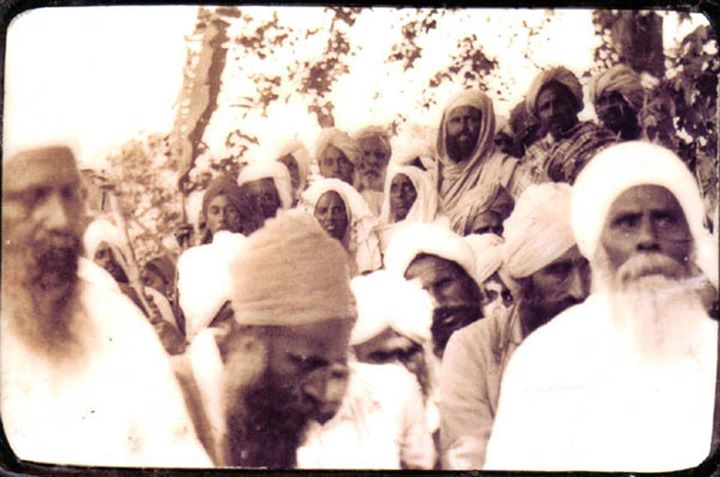
Photograph of Nand Singh (rightmost, foreground), founder of the Nanaksari sect of Sikhism, with a group of his followers

Nand Singh left his house to do sewa at Gurdwara Sahib in Firozpur. He acquired a distinct group of followers during his lifetime. At a very young age, he left his family to seek enlightenment and became a disciple of Maha Harnam Singh, another great Saint of great spirit. There he met Harnam Singh, who was impressed by his spirituality. He mentored him in the ways of devotion and the spirit of sacrifice.

It is said Singh went to a forest for further meditation. After some time, he returned from the forest and stayed outside nearby village. The villagers constructed a temporary shelter for him. After some time, dwellers of the Kalera village approached him with an invitation to their village, which he accepted. En route, he stopped at a well located between Kalera and Kaunke. He made his camp there, and a small hut was made for him by the villagers. Singh started his meditation there.

Nand Singh established his dera, now known as Nanaksar, near Kalera. The food (langar) was provided by nearby villagers, a practice which is in place to this day. Unlike other gurdwaras, no financial offerings are made by the devotees in front of the Guru Granth Sahib at this Sri Nanaksar Gurdwara.

== Death ==
Gurdwara Nanaksar in Jagraon, dedicated to Nand Singh

Nand Singh died at Nanaksar in Ludhiana district, Punjab, which is now recognized as the central dera although his devotees have established Gurudwaras under the name of Nanaksar across Punjab, Haryana, Uttarakhand, and Canada.

== See also ==
- Sects of Sikhism
