= British Sikh Student Federation =

Sikh student group

British Sikh Student Federation Logo

The British Sikh Student Federation is student body registered with the National Union Of Students based in the United Kingdom. The organization was formed in late 2008, it is now one of the leading Sikh Student groups in the United Kingdom.

== 2010 ==
BSSF has held a number of Youth Kirtan Darbars at Gurdwaras across the UK and has held several events with other Sikh groups to bring Sikh youths in the UK together. Sikh camps have been key to bringing Sikh youths/students together across the UK with camps stretching Gurdwaras across the UK.

BSSF also held the first ever Shaheedi Samagam, or religious Sikh gathering, in the United Kingdom in memory of Sikh leader Shaheed Sant Jarnail Singh Ji Khalsa Bhindranwale at the Dashmesh Darbar Gurdwara in Ilfrod East London from 18 to 20 June 2010. Shaheed Sant Jarnail Singh Ji Khalsa Bhindranwale, who was martyred defending the Golden Temple Harmandir Sahib in 1984, was declared as the "Greatest Sikh of the 20th Century" by Sikhism's highest authority Sri Akal Takht Sahib.

Sikh Youth Football Tournament 2010, held in conjunction with Dal Khalsa UK, was one of the biggest Sikh youth gathering in the UK with over 1000 in attendance at Goals Hayes, London.

In 2010, BSSF became a full member of National Union of Students (United Kingdom), and continues to be the voice of Sikh students within the Union across the country. BSSF has supported all major NUS events and gatherings such as the recent protests against tuition fees in London.

== 2011 and beyond ==
In January 2011, BSSF held a genocide and human rights lobby for South Asia at the British Parliament. The Lobby was supported by Jammu Kashmir Liberation Front UK, World Nepalese Student Organisation UK, British Tamil Forum, and Naga's based in the UK, who are being supported by the wider Christian Community. The event was supported by Sikh Federation, British Sikh Council, Council of Khalistan (UK), Dal Khalsa UK, SAD (Amritsar UK) and SAD (Panch Pardhani UK) to extend their support to this Lobby.

Gagandip Singh, then the president of the organization, was murdered in south east London.
