= Gursikh =

Sikh term

Gursikh (Punjabi: ਗੁਰਸਿੱਖ (Gurmukhi)) is a term used by Sikhs, either to describe any Sikh, or one who is especially devoted to following the Sikh guru, a "pious, observant Sikh".

One who calls himself a Gursikh of the True Guru, shall rise in the early morning hours and meditate on the Lord's Name.

== See also ==
- Amritdhari
- Anand Karaj
- Gurmukh
- List of Sikhism-related topics
