= Guru Ladho Re Diwas =

Sikh festival

Guru Ladho Re Diwas is a festival celebrated among Sikhs, especially Labana Sikhs, commemorating the finding of Guru Tegh Bahadur, the ninth Guru of Sikhs, by Baba Makhan Shah Labana.
