= Mul Mantar =

Opening words of the Sikh scripture, the Guru Granth Sahib

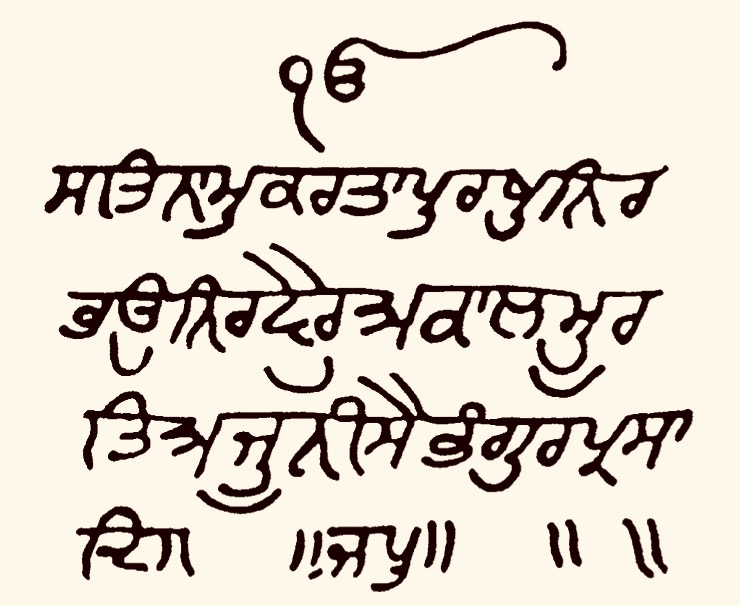
Mūl Mantar in Guru Arjan's or Bhai Gurdas' handwriting, 17th century Kartarpur manuscript.

The Mūl Mantar (Punjabi: ਮੂਲ ਮੰਤਰ, [muːlᵊ mən̪t̪əɾᵊ]) is the opening verse of the Sikh scripture, the Guru Granth Sahib. It consists of twelve words in the Punjabi language, written in Gurmukhi script, and are the most widely known among the Sikhs. They summarise the essential teaching of Guru Nanak, thus constituting a succinct doctrinal statement of Sikhism.

It has been variously translated, with the interpretation of the first two words (Ik Onkar) particularly contested. These are rendered as "There is one god,” "One reality is,” "This being is one,” and others. Sometimes the disagreements include capitalising the “G” in “god,” or the “R” in “reality,” which affects the implied meaning in English. Some consider it monotheistic, others monist. The general view favors the monotheistic interpretation, but not the Abrahamic understanding of monotheism. It is rather "Guru Nanak's mystical awareness of the one that is expressed through the many." The remaining ten words after the first two are literally translated as true name, the creator, without fear, without hate, timeless in form, beyond birth, self-existent, (known by) the grace of Guru.

The verse is repeated in the Sikh scripture before numerous Shabad, or hymns. It existed in many versions in the 16th-century before it was given its final form by Guru Arjan in the 17th century. The essential elements of the mantar are found in Guru Nanak's compositions, the various epithets he used for Akal Purakh (Ultimate Reality). It has been described as a 'creedal statement' that symbolically describes the experience of Guru Nanak.

== Etymology ==
A mantar means "formula, succinct doctrinal or sacred words with spiritual meaning". The word mūl means "root, main or "fundamental." The Mūl Mantar is thus "root formula", or the root statement of Sikhism.

== Text ==
The Mūl Mantar is:

Gurmukhi	Transliteration	Translation 1 (Eleanor Nesbitt)	Translation 2 (Eleanor Nesbitt)	Translation 3 (Pashaura Singh)
ੴ ਸਤਿ ਨਾਮੁ ਕਰਤਾ ਪੁਰਖੁ ਨਿਰਭਉ ਨਿਰਵੈਰੁ ਅਕਾਲ ਮੂਰਤਿ ਅਜੂਨੀ ਸੈਭੰ ਗੁਰ ਪ੍ਰਸਾਦਿ॥	ikk(u) ōaṅkār(u) sat(i)-nām(u) karatā purakh(u) nirapà'u niravair(u) akāl(a) mūrat(i) ajūnī saipàṅ gur(a)-prasād(i)॥	There is one god, named truth, the creator, without fear, without hate, timeless in form, beyond birth, self-existent, (known by) the grace of the Guru.	This Being is one, truth by name, creator, fearless, without hatred, of timeless form, unborn, self-existent, and known by the Guru's grace.	There is one supreme being, the eternal reality (true name), the creator, without fear, devoid of enmity, immortal, never incarnated, self-existent, (known by) the grace of the Guru.

The extended version with the Jap verse is:

Gurmukhi	Transliteration	Translation
ੴ ਸਤਿ ਨਾਮੁ ਕਰਤਾ ਪੁਰਖੁ ਨਿਰਭਉ ਨਿਰਵੈਰੁ ਅਕਾਲ ਮੂਰਤਿ ਅਜੂਨੀ ਸੈਭੰ ਗੁਰ ਪ੍ਰਸਾਦਿ॥ ॥ ਜਪੁ॥ ਆਦਿ ਸਚੁ ਜੁਗਾਦਿ ਸਚੁ॥ ਹੈ ਭੀ ਸਚੁ ਨਾਨਕ ਹੋਸੀ ਭੀ ਸਚੁ॥੧॥	ikk(u) ōaṅkār(u) sat(i)-nām(u) karatā purakh(u) nirapà'u niravair(u) akāl(a) mūrat(i) ajūnī saipàṅ gur(a)-prasād(i)॥ ॥ jap(u)॥ ād(i) sacch(u) jugād(i) sacch(u)॥ hai pī̀ sacch(u)॥ nānak(a) hosī pī̀ sacch(u)॥1॥	One creator, name is truth, agentive (doer) being, without fear, without hatred, timeless form, unbegotten, self-existent, known by the Guru's grace. Recite: True at the beginning, true through the ages, is yet true, O Nanak, and will be true.

== Grammar ==
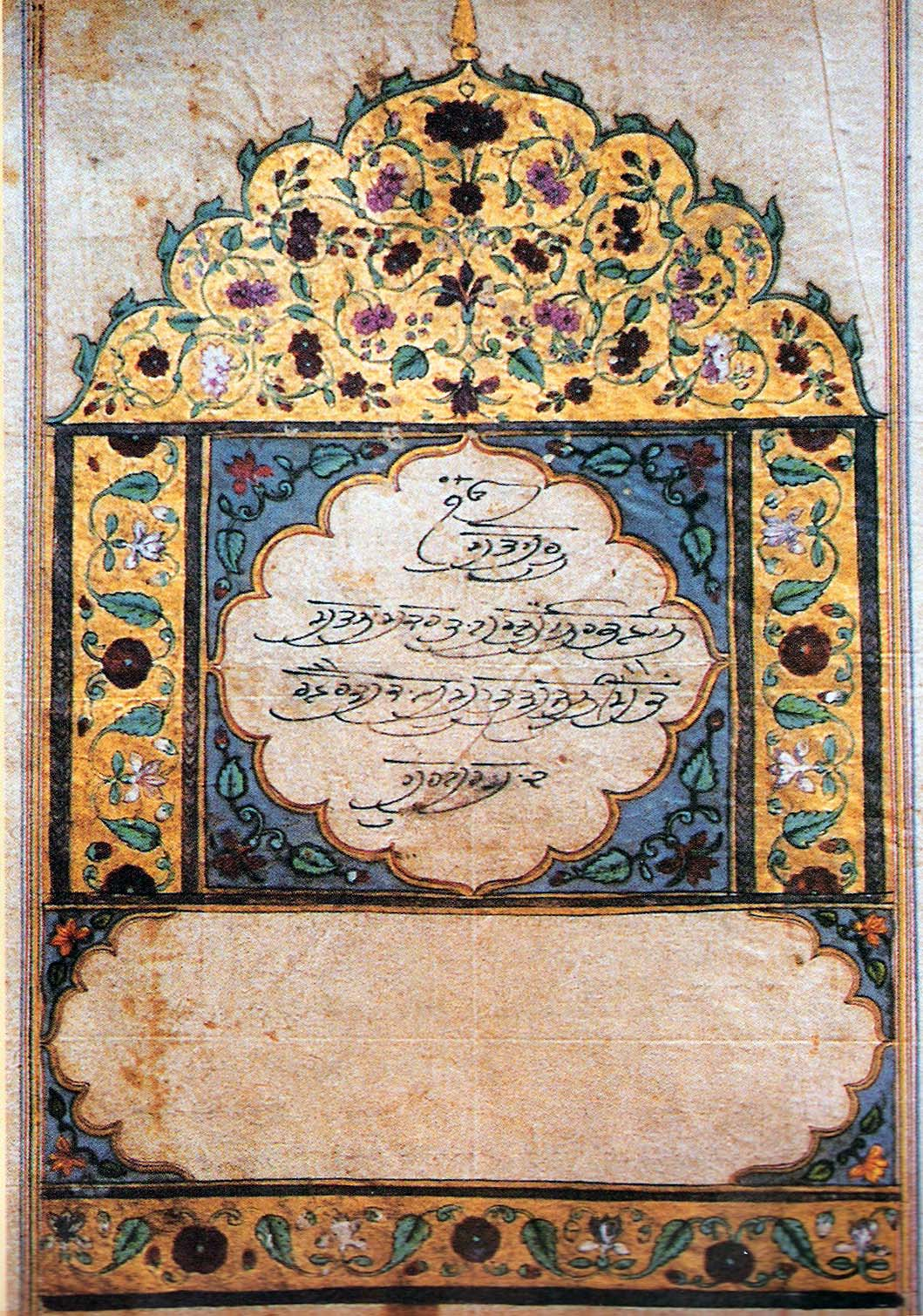
Illuminated Adi Granth folio with Mūl Mantar of Guru Gobind Singh

The archaic language of the Guru Granth Sahib is highly inflected; the suffixed short vowels parenthesised above indicate various declensions. In the Mūl Mantar, the suffixed -u indicates nouns and adjectives in the masculine singular direct case, though some words ending with -ā (like karatā) can also indicate this case. This suffix can also indicate an imperative when attached to a verb, as in japu.

The suffixed -a can indicate the masculine vocative case, as in Nānaka, the masculine singular oblique case in compounds as in gura prasādi, and a feminine singular direct adjective as in akala, as well as the masculine plural direct case and the feminine singular direct case.

The suffixed -i can indicate the possessive case in compounds (as in sati nāmu), and the locative (as in ādi and jugādi) or instrumental case as in gura prāsadi; these terms would be ādu, jugādu, and prasādu if taking the direct case. It is also another feminine singular direct case (as in mūrati); -a and -i are among the predominant declensions for this case.

Adjectives and modifiers also agree in number and gender with their dependent element, hence ikku oaṅkāru, akāla mūrati, and the term mūlu mantaru itself.

Most of these cases still exist in the modern language in slightly different forms; features in the archaic language like the masculine singular direct suffix -u and feminine singular direct suffix -a parallel nominal declensions in other related languages.

The included grave accent included in the above transliterations illustrates tones and guide the verbal pronunciation of the verse.

== Earlier Versions ==
The modern Mūl Mantar is the edited version that was canonised by Guru Arjan. It is the Mūl Mantar that is widely used among Sikhs today. It is different from the version originally written by Guru Nanak. The earliest form of the Mūl Mantar is found in the goindwal pothi which comes from time of Guru Amar Das. In the goindwal pothi the Mūl Mantar is:

Gurmukhi	Translation
ੴ ਸਤਿਗੁਰੂ ਪਰਸਾਦੁ ਸਚੁ ਨਾਮੁ ਕਰਤਾਰੁ ਨਿਰਭਉ ਨਿਰੀਕਾਰੁ ਅਕਾਲ ਮੂਰਤਿ ਅਜੂਨੀ ਸੰਭਉ॥੧॥	There is one supreme being known by grace through the true Guru The true name the creator the fearless one and the formless one The timeless one never incarnated, and self-existent. (1).

This variation of the Mūl Mantar was standard in the time of Guru Amar Das. The modern Mūl Mantar was formed by Guru Arjan during his editing process. An earlier draft of Guru Arjan's editing process though still included the text sat-gur(a)-prasād(i) in place of the modern gur(a)-prasād(i). Most variations of the Mūl Mantar came from other Sikh traditions. There are 7 Variations of the Mūl Mantar found within the Goindwal Pothis, which comes from the Mohan Sikh tradition. There are other variations of the Mūl Mantar from the Mina Scribal tradition. The modern Mūl Mantar was formed by Guru Arjan during the canonization of the Adi Granth. Other versions of the Mūl Mantar can be found within the GNDU MS1245 Manuscript, which comes from an independent scribal tradition. It is unclear whether or not Guru Nanak had made a Mūl Mantar. The most common textual variants seen in the Mūl Mantar is Satgur Parsad at the end of the Mūl Mantar instead of Gur Prasad. Most variations are minor and do not affect the essence of the Mūl Mantar.

== Discourse ==
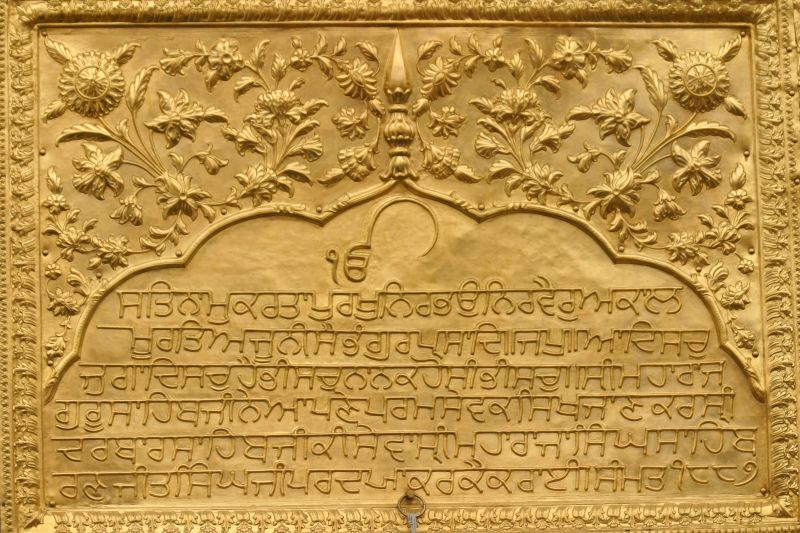
The extended version of the Mūl Mantar at the Darshani Deori, the main entrance leading to the pathway into the Golden Temple

The Mūl Mantar is a widely known part of Sikh scripture, but it has posed a challenge to translators. The first two words Ik Onkar has been rendered multiple ways. It has been translated as "'There is one god', as 'One reality is', 'there is one God', 'singularity despite seeming plurality,' and 'This being is one,' and asserts the "distinctively Sikh theological emphasis" on "the ineffable quality of God" as "the Person beyond time," "the Eternal One," and "the One without form," and is canonically understood in Sikhism to refer to "absolute monotheistic unity of God". The varying capitalisation of "God", "Reality", or "Being" affects the meaning in English. A number of translations erroneously change the Mūl Mantar from a list of qualities to a statement of facts and possessive adjectives. For example, they may change Satnam from "truth by name" to "His name is truth", which adds a masculine quality to the Mūl Mantar which does not appear in the original Gurmukhi. These sacred words of Sikhism do not presume a particular gender. the Mūl Mantar serves as a "succinct statement which set the Sikh doctrine apart from the philosophical systems of both Indic and Semitic religious traditions."

Some Sikh institutions, like the SGPC, consider the Mūl Mantar proper to end at gura prasādi, arguing that what follows is the name and first line of the Japji Sahib composition, citing the number of times that the verse appears as such preceding Gurbani compositions. On the other hand, other historic institutions, like some taksals (traditional Sikh religious educational institutions) and gurmat schools, hold the Mūl Mantar to be the full following verse, contending that this form has been used in the Amrit Sanchar baptising ceremony since its inception. This is in line with the stand taken by the nihangs and other groups who stress the recitation of the complete Mūl Mantar, arguing that this tradition has come directly from the time of the Gurus, and there is reliable evidence to support this contention; like the kamar kassā, or waist-belt body armor of Guru Gobind Singh, preserved at Moti Bagh Palace in Patiala, bearing an inscription of the long form.

== See also ==
- Namokar Mantra
