= Harnam Singh (saint) =

- Born: July 1897 (Hoshiarpur, Punjab)
- Died: 4 January 1983 (New Delhi)
- Years active: 1897–1983
- Known for: Teacher of Sikhism and Spirituality
- Successor: Sant Baba Sewa Singh Ji
- Spouse: Remained Unmarried
- Parent(s): Accher Singh and Narain Kaur

Harnam Singh (July 1897 – January 1983) was a Brahmgiani known for his enlightenment teachings of the Sikh religion, through meditation of "Naam-Simran."

== Biography ==
Sant Baba Harnam Singh Ji, was born in Dhugga Kalan, Tehsil Dasuya a village in the district of Hoshiarpur. He had four brothers and 2 sisters at a young age Baba Ji's parent's Accher Singh and Narain Kaur passed away. Baba Ji started helping his brothers in the fields cultivating wheat and other food. Baba Ji learned Gurmukhi from the village Granthi.

Baba Ji’s met with an Udasi Sadhu by the name of Santokh Das (whom they served for 11 years). Meeting with Sikh Saints proved fruitless as everyone they met merely wanted to recruit them as their chela. Baba Ji then went into a state of Bairaag and after three days, did ardas and heard a message asking them to take Amrit. Baba Ji did this when they were 21.

In 1947 after the partition, Baba Ji’s family shifted from Sargodha to Dhoul Pur (Rajasthan). One day when Baba Ji was deeply engrossed in meditation they received a message asking him to preach the principles of Sikhism and go to a deserted and barren place at a distance of 4 to 5 miles in the eastern direction of their and to village and make the place a centre.

Baba Ji went to this place which was then known as Ram Pur (Theh) where they prayed long hours and was known as a major place where Baba Ji did his meditation. Numerous Naam seekers and spiritual inquisitives began coming to Baba Ji who used to give them guidance on life and Sikhi. Weekly Naam Abhiaas Kamaaee Smagam began and thousands of men and women came in contact with Baba Ji to benefit from their darshan and gain spiritually.

Great Mahapurakhs like Sant Baba Kartar Singh Ji Khalsa Bhindranwale and current Jathedar of The Damdami Taksal Sant Baba Jarnail Singh Ji Khalsa Bhindranwale met and were deeply impressed by Baba Ji's teachings and ideals.

It was Baba Ji's desire to see the entire “Khalsa Panth” in Chardi Kala and so he meditated purely for this cause from Vaisakhi 1976 to Vaisakhi 1979 and did Ardaas for this same reason. This was the time when emergency had been declared in India. Even in this crucial time Baba Ji joined hands with Sant Baba Kartar Singh Ji and other Sikh leaders to awaken the sangat by arranging religious processions, meetings and discussions. One such procession was arranged at Gurdwara Rampur Khera Sahib to commemorate 300 years of martyrdom of Shri Guru Tegh Bahadur Sahib Ji.

Baba Ji arranged for roads, bridges and buildings to be constructed, khalsa schools and colleges were given immense financial help from Baba Ji and Sangat alike Poorer students from all around were given higher education to get good jobs in government and teaching. Free eye camps, free medical facilities were constructed to aid the needy on behalf of Baba Ji. Even now with the co-operation of Saadh Sangat this practice is continued by Baba Ji’s successor Baba Sewa Singh Ji in which permanent allopathic and homeopathic clinics, centre for eye treatment having modern facilities, old age care home, keertan vidayala, and a training institute for Sikh preachers have been setup and are providing free services to any who needs it.

Baba Ji's successor Baba Sewa Singh Ji published a book called Se Kinehiya based on the history and teaching of Baba Ji and many other books from Baba Ji's teachings.

Baba Ji dedicated their life to Guru Sahib and the Khalsa Panth. Even in the last days of their life they did not hesitate joining the Dharam Yudh Mocha in 1982. Though Sant Baba Jarnail Singh Ji Khalsa Bhindranwale tried to persuade Baba Ji not to go to the jail due to their old age and unsound health, they along with thousands of their followers went to the jail and helped the morcha financially.

While in jail Baba Ji baptised many Sikhs. Ultimately, due to the harsh jail conditions, Baba Ji’s physical condition worsened and although he was given expert medical treatment, and under the Hukam of Akaal Purakh, breathed their last on 4 January 1983 at the All India Institute of Medical Sciences, New Delhi. They were honoured as a “Shaheed” at their Dusehra (Antim Ardaass).
