= Akal Purakh =

Sikh name used to denote God

Akal Purakh (Punjabi: ਅਕਾਲ ਪੁਰਖ, romanized: Akāla Purakha, lit. 'the Timeless Being') is an interchangeable Sikh name used to denote the concept of God, or the omnipresent divine.

== Meaning ==
The body armour of Guru Gobind Singh, with the opening verses of the "Akal Ustat" - Akal Purakh Ki Rachha Hamnai

It literally means "without-death being". The first word Akal, literally "timeless, immortal, non-temporal," is a term integral to Sikh tradition and philosophy. It is extensively used in the Guru Granth Sahib, and the Dasam Granth hymns by Guru Gobind Singh, who titled one of his poetic compositions Akal Ustat, i.e. "In Praise (Ustati) of the Timeless One (Akal)". However, the concept of Akal is not peculiar to the Dasam Granth. It goes back to the very origins of the Sikh faith with Guru Nanak. In Guru Nanak's thought, the Akal Purakh is understood as without form, nirankar, and is often described as being inexpressible through words.

The term Kāl refers to "time," with the negative prefix a- added to render the word akal, meaning "timeless" or "eternal." Purakh refers to "being" or "entity." Together, the two words form the meaning "timeless, eternal being."

The word Purakh (ਪੁਰਖ) is the Punjabi form of Purusha (पुरुष).

Akal Purakh does not refer to a personified deity like the Christian conception of God centred around a concept of personal salvation, but rather to the concept of an ultimate reality or timeless being. It cannot be fully described in words but it can be experienced by those who reach a certain meditative state in which one reaches liberation. Akal Purakh took pity upon the sufferings of humanity entrapped in sansara, the continuous cycle of rebirth and death, and revealed the divine words (gurshabad) in the form of gurbani, taught by the successive Sikh gurus to those of humanity willing to learn how to know and experience Akal Purakh.

== Usage ==
The Sikh Rehat Maryada produced by the Shiromani Gurdwara Parbandhak Committee proposes to use the term Akal Purakh as the paramount and formal Sikh term for God, despite there being variations of this name found in the compositions authored by Guru Nanak which were employed far more commonly than Akal Purakh (used only once by Nanak), with variations being Adi Purakh (used twelve times) and Karta Purakh (used three times). Furthermore, other terms for God, sourced from Arabic or Persian, that were used by Nanak were even more commonly used, such as Sahib (hundred-and-thirty-seven times), Khasam (seventy-eight times), or Patishah (twenty-three times).

== See also ==
- Akal
- Ik Onkar
- Names of God
- Nirankar
- Waheguru
- Purusha
