= Nirankar =

Attribute associated to God in Sikhism

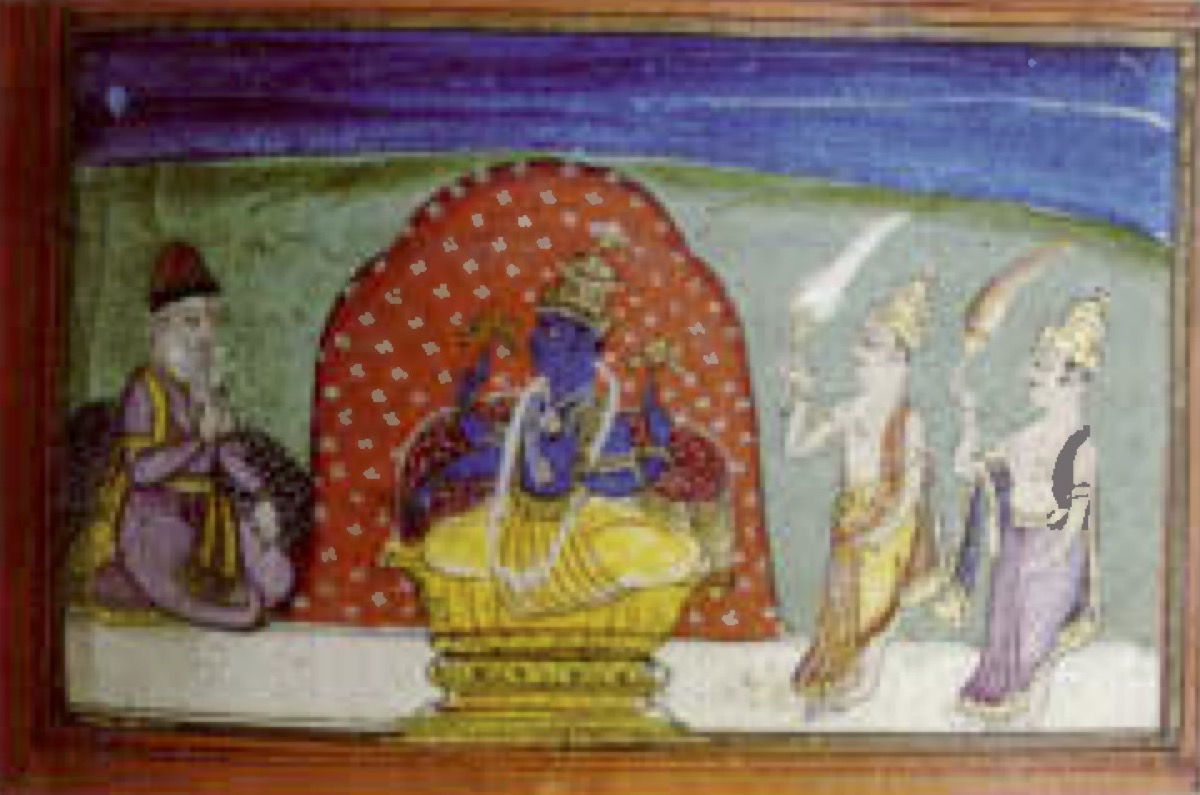
'Baba Nanak and Nirankara (formless reality, Waheguru, or the Supreme God)', Janamsakhi painting from a Kashmiri manuscript, early 19th century

Nirankar (Punjabi: ਨਿਰੰਕਾਰ, lit. 'formless') is one of the many attributes associated to God in Sikhism and means The Formless One.

== Etymology ==
The word has its roots in the Sanskrit word nirākārā (Sanskrit: ਨਿਰਾਕਾਰਾ/निराकारा) and is a compound of two words: nir, which means "without", and akar (ākār), which means "shape" or "form". Therefore, the term is translated as 'The Formless'.

== Meaning and usage ==
The term is used as one of the names of God by Sikhs.

It finds usage in the Guru Granth Sahib:

ਸਚ ਖੰਡਿ ਵਸੈ ਨਿਰੰਕਾਰੁ ॥

सच खंडि वसै निरंकारु ॥

Sacẖ kẖand vasai nirankār.

In the realm of Truth abides the Formless Lord.

— SGGS. Pg 8

=== Conjunction ===
The words is sometime conjoined with other terms. Some examples are below:

- Nirankar Purusha
- Nirankar Alepa

== History ==
The term was first used to describe the divine by Guru Nanak. He described the Akal Purakh, the ultimate reality or 'timeless being', as nirankar, adding that it cannot be expressed through words. The name later would become the namesake of the Nirankari sect founded by Baba Dayal Singh.
