= Anand Marriage Act, 1909 =

Imperial Legislative Council
- Long title: An Act to remove doubts as to the validity of the marriage ceremony common among the Sikhs called Anand.
- Citation: Act No. 7 of 1909
- Territorial extent: whole of India
- Enacted by: Imperial Legislative Council
- Enacted: 22 October 1909

Amended by
- Anand Marriage (Amendment) Act, 2012 (29 of 2012)
- Status: In force

The Anand Marriage Act, 1909 was a piece of legislation dealing with Sikh marriage in British India that validated the Sikh marriage customs. The act was a result of the ongoing Singh Sabha movement. It helped cement a separate Sikh religious identity from Hinduism and was a landmark decision that helped in the formation of modern religious boundaries observed today. The act is valid today in an amended form.

== History ==
=== Passing of law ===
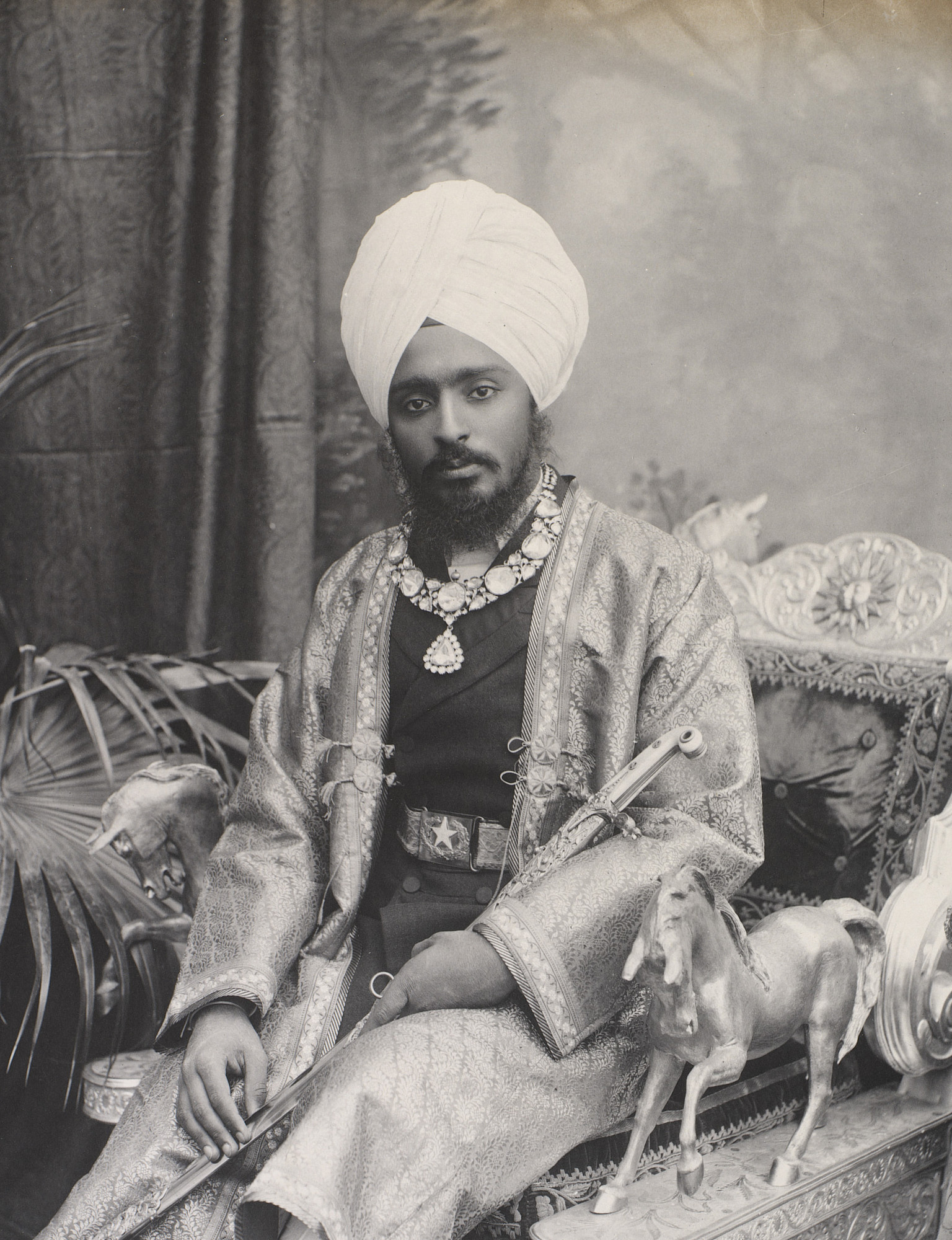
Ripudaman Singh of Nabha, who was instrumental in the passing of the act

Sikhs believe Guru Amar Das introduced the Sikh wedding ceremony, known as the Anand Karaj, and Guru Ram Das introduced the Lāvān. The Anand text and Laavaan hymns constitute two fundamental components of the Sikh marriage ceremony. Later-on, reformist Sikh sects, such as the Namdharis and Nirankaris, helped formulate, standardize, and simplify the Sikh wedding ceremony. While the anand form of marriage has historically existed amongst the Sikhs, it was only until prince Ripudaman Singh of Nabha efforts beginning in 1908 that it was legally sanctioned in law as a valid form of marriage.

The Chief Khalsa Diwan's members were instrumental in the passing of the Anand Marriage Act, 1909. The members felt that the Sikh marriage rites did not have legal basis behind them and that Hindu influences remained in the marriage customs of many Sikhs. Sikhs also showed more predisposition to intercaste marriages. The organizations opposition to "Hindu" rituals in the marriage practices of Sikhs led to them being condemned and boycott by some traditionalist factions within the Sikh community. Sundar Singh Majithia of the C.K.D. and Ripudaman Singh of Nabha State (who introduced the bill on 30 October 1908) pushed the Sikh marriage bill through the Imperial Legislative Council despite heavy opposition, with the former piloting it and the latter intervening, where it was successfully passed on 22 October 1909. Sunder Singh Lyallpuri also played a role in the formation and passing of the bill. The passing of the bill helped with the keeping of a separate Sikh identity apart from the Hindus.

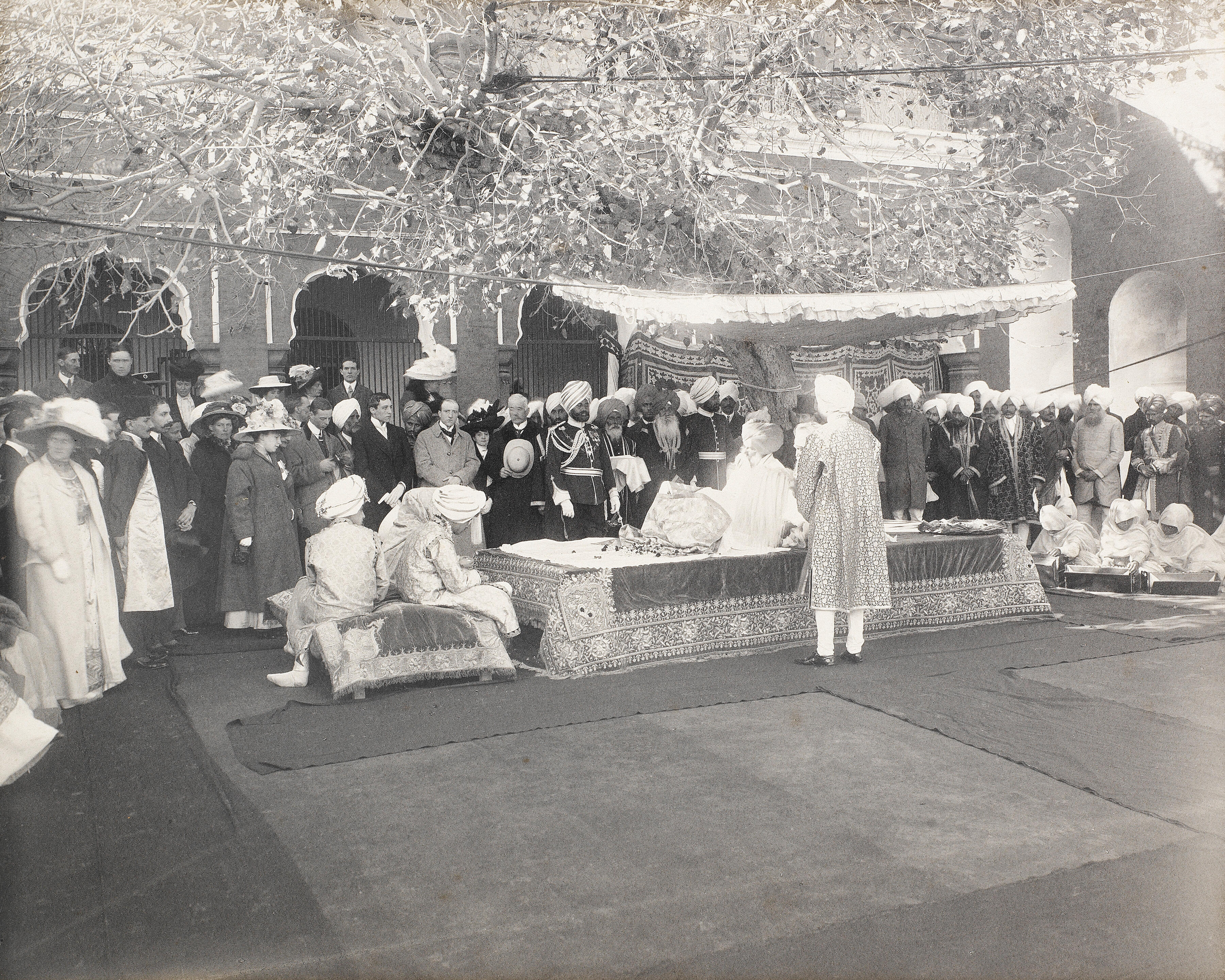
Photograph of the Sikh wedding of Kunwar Paramjit Singh of Kapurthala and Maharani Brinda Devi Sahiba of Jubbal, 1911

However, contemporary opponents at the time worried that the act would provide a legal framework that legitimizes a barrier between the Sikh and Hindu communities, pushing out many non-Khalsa, sehajdhari-alligned members from the Sikh fold. Meanwhile, Sikh proponents of the bill saw this criticism as external meddling in their religious affairs, claimed that non-anand forms of marriage were "Hindu" rather than "Sikh", and argued about the involvement of the Sikh gurus in the formation of separate Sikh marriage customs. Sikh periodicals of the era, such as the Khalsa Akhbar and Khalsa Advocate, published many articles in-favour of the codeification of the Sikh marriage customs. The name for the act was also proposed to be Sikh Marriage Act but this was opposed by some Sikh supporters. The act was passed on 22 October 1909.

=== After Indian independence ===
After the independence of India in 1947, Sikh marriages would be registered under the Hindu Marriage Act, 1955, as the earlier 1909 act was invalidated by the Indian constitution in 1950. The 1955 act was viewed as conservative because it applied to any person who is Hindu by religion in any of its forms, but it also includes other religions, such as Jains, Buddhists, or Sikhs as specified in Article 44 of the Indian Constitution. The 1909 act was amended by act 48 of 1959. However, with the passage of Anand Marriage (Amendment) Bill in 2012, Sikhs now also have their own personal law related to marriage.

==== 2012 amendment ====
The 1909 act would later be amended by the Anand Marriage (Amendment) Act, 2012 on 7 June 2012. This act paved the way for the validation of Sikh traditional marriages, amending the Anand Marriage Act of 1909, thus providing for compulsory registration of "Anand Karaj" marriages. This allowed for Sikhs to register their marriages under the 2012 Anand Marriage Act instead of the 1955 Hindu Marriage Act. In 2025, the Supreme Court of India validated the legality of Anand Karaj marriages and requested all Indian states & union territories to develop a framework for them, as some still have yet to notify the rules despite the 2012 amendment. Haryana had notified its rules regarding anand marriages in 2014.

== Legacy ==
According to Harjot Oberoi, the passing of the bill in 1909 was a instrumental part of the formation of a modern Sikh religious identity.

== See also ==
- Sikh Gurdwaras Act, 1925
