= Patit =

Someone renouncing the Sikh religion

Patit (Punjabi: ਪਤਿਤ Gurmukhi) is a term which refers to a person who has been initiated into the Sikh religion, but violates the religion's precepts and leaves it. The term is sometimes translated as apostate.

== Description ==
Its legal definition as inserted in the Sikh Gurdwaras Act, 1925, through the amending Act XI of 1944:: Patit means a person who being a Keshdhari Sikh, trims or shaves his beard or keshas or who after taking amrit commits any one or more of the four kurahits.

Delhi Sikh Gurdwaras Act, 1971, contains a similar definition except a reference to keshdhari because unlike Sikh Gurdwaras Act, 1925, it defines only keshdhari, and not sahajdhari, as Sikhs. It states: "Patit" means a Sikh who trims or shaves his beard or hair (keshas) or who after taking amrit commits any one or more of the four kurahits.

In the Sikh Rehat Maryada, Section Six, it states: The undermentioned four transgressions must be avoided:

- Dishonouring the hair;
- Eating the meat of an animal slaughtered the Kutha way;
- Cohabiting with a person other than one's spouse;
- Using an intoxicant (such as smoking, drinking alcohol, using recreational drugs or tobacco)

These four kurahit causes of apostasy were first listed by Guru Gobind Singh.

== See also ==
- Sahajdhari
- Khalsa
- Gurmukh
- Gurmata
- Manmukh
