= 2017 Tamil Nadu farmers' protest =

Protest by Tamil Nadu farmers in Delhi

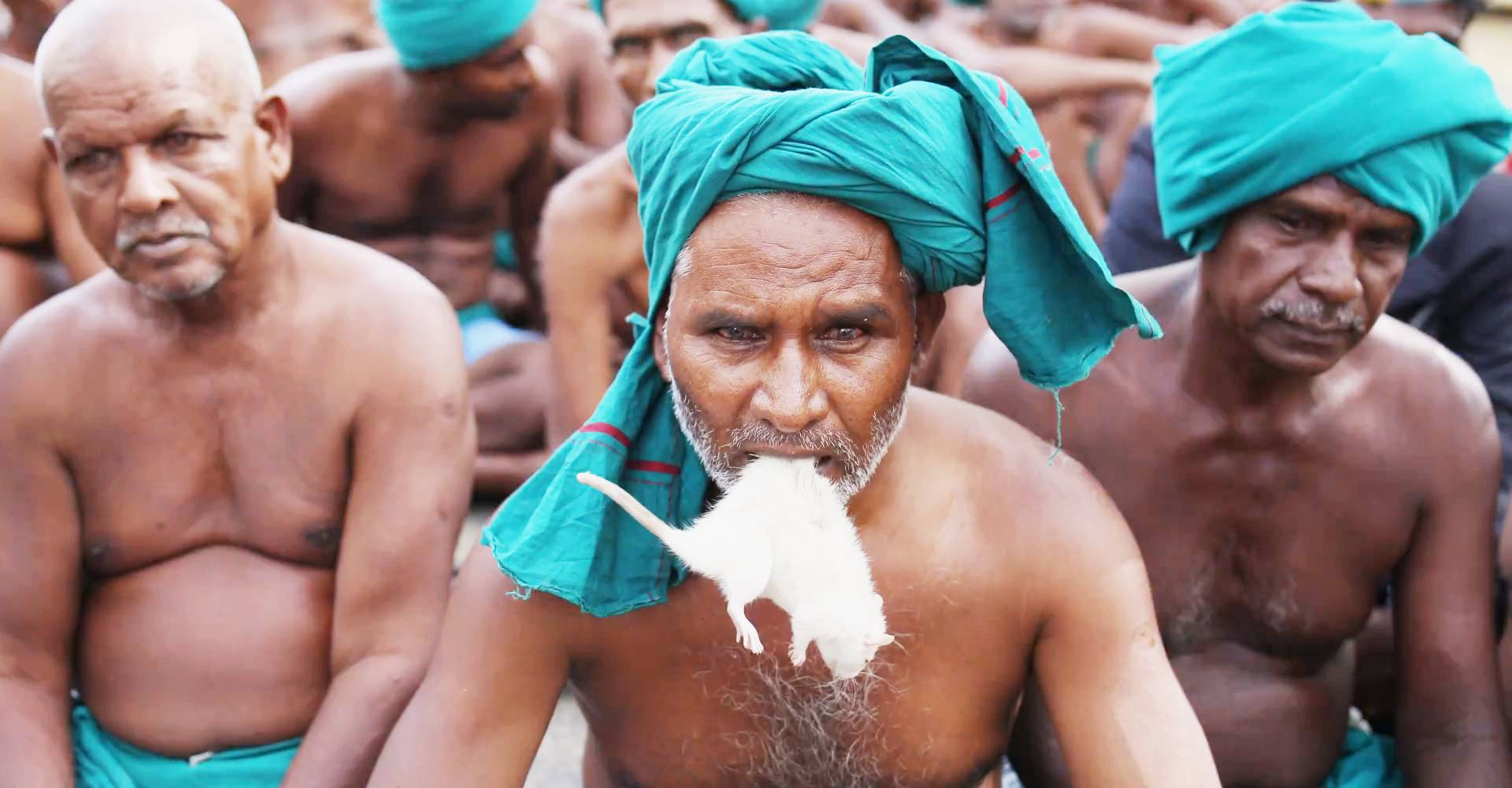
- A farmer with a mouse in his mouth
- Date: 14 March 2017 – 26 October 2017
- Location: Jantar Mantar, Delhi, India
- Caused by: Draught, Crop failures, Suicides of farmers
- Goals: Loan waiver from the central government
- Methods: Dharna; Demonstration
- Status: Ended

Casualties
- Injuries: 141 hospitalized (protester's claims)

The 2017 Tamil Nadu farmers' protest was a protest against the Bharatiya Janata Party-led central government by farmers from Tamil Nadu demanding waiver of their farm loans among other demands due to crop failures. The protests started after the 2016–2017 Drought in Tamil Nadu, which was caused after the worst rainfall to the state after 140 years. This led to many farmers committing suicides and dying of heart attacks.

The protest was started by a group of farmers led by 72-year old farmer P. Ayyakannu on March 14, 2017 at the Jantar Mantar in Delhi and went on for months. The protesting farmers shaved half of their moustaches and heads, held snakes and mice in their mouths, performed mock funerals, flogged themselves, brought the skulls of other farmers who had committed suicide, drank their urine and even ate human feces as protest.

== Background and causes ==
=== Kaveri River water dispute ===
Protests started in Tamil Nadu in August 2016 after Karnataka declined to release water from the Cauvery River into Tamil Nadu. This created distress among the farmers in the Delta districts.

=== Drought ===
The 2016–2017 Drought in Tamil Nadu created the worst agricultural crisis in the state, where more than 40 percent of people earn a living from agriculture. The crisis was caused by water shortage due to poor rainfall, reduced crop costs, and decreasing access to formal financial services. The state government announced the entire state as drought hit.

In the year 2016, Tamil Nadu faced the worst rainfall for the prior 140 years which led to the decline state's cropping area by 41.5% and the paddy procurement by 84.4%. Average annual rainfall decreased by 62% in 2016. The Northeast monsoon season failed in the state with the worst rainfall ever, with scattered rain in some areas. This led to the highest deficit of reservoir levels in all of India with an 82% reduction. This led to only one-third of the fields not sown in Tamil Nadu.

=== Farmer suicides ===
Tamil Nadu recorded 604 suicides of farm workers in 2015. A local fact-finding team reported that in the districts of Nagapattinam, Thiruvarur, Ariyalur, Tanjavur and Pudukkottai more than 120 farmers had committed suicide or died by suicide in two months in 2017. The reports stated that the numbers began with one or two deaths a day and grew to ten. Since October 2016, over 270 farmers in the state have reportedly committed suicide or died naturally. A local farmers association insisted that there were more than 250 farmer suicides since October 2016. The farmers who protested claimed that more than 106 farmers had committed suicide in a month and they used skulls and bones to highlight the suicides of the farmers.

== Demands ==
The Government of Tamil Nadu requested a relief fund of ₹ 40,000 crores but the Government of India only approved ₹ 2014 crores which led to discontent among the farmers. In addition to the ₹ 40,000 crore drought fund, the farmers have called for their farms loans to be cancelled and for pensions for those farmers who no longer work. The loan waiver of Rs 36,359 crore announced by the Chief Minister of Uttar Pradesh, Yogi Adityanath, added more weight to the demands of the farmers.

The other main demands include:

1. Prevent Tamil Nadu from transforming into a desert.
2. Prevent the river Cauvery from becoming dry.
3. Establishment Committee to manage the Cauvery.
4. Linking all rivers, Write off loans borrowed by farmers.
5. Profitable price for agricultural commodities.
6. Fair drought relief packages for drought-hit Tamil Nadu.

== Timeline of protests ==
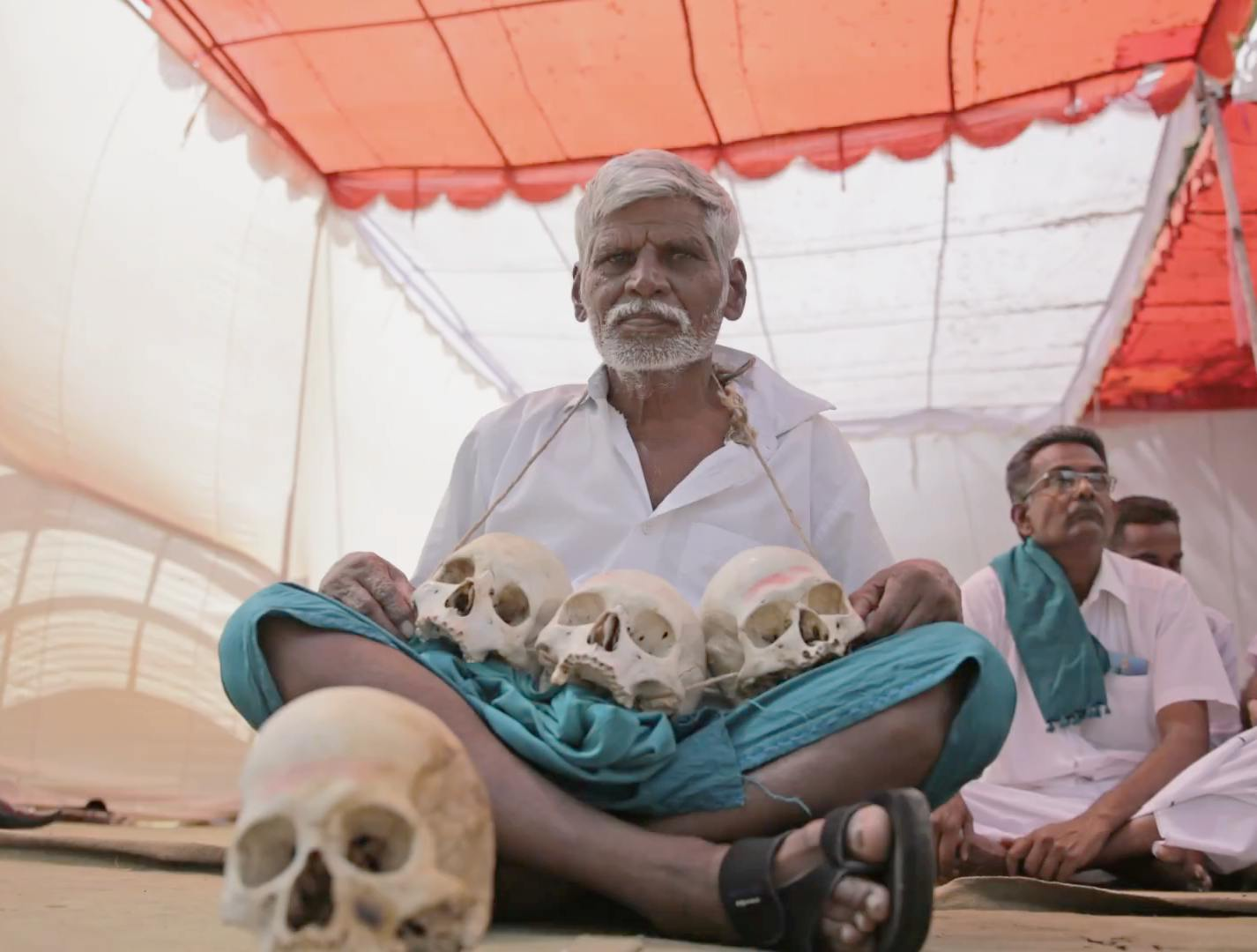
A farmer with skulls allegedly belonging to the farmers who had committed suicide

March 14: Around 80 farmers started their protests in Jantar Mantar, Delhi led by a 72 year old farmer, P. Ayyakannu demanding loan waivers from the central government. The first day the farmers protested with the skulls of the farmers who had committed suicide.

March 15: The group started a provocative campaign during their. The protestors wore nooses around their heads, held skulls they said belonged to the farmers who had committed suicide, performed mock funerals and kept dead rats and snakes in their mouths. Although these protests received media and political attention due to their exceptional appearance, they did not contribute in any of their requests being addressed.

March 17: The farmers protested by holding dead snakes in the mouth.

April 2: The farmers shaved half of their heads symbolize half-barren lands. They also had shave half of their moustaches.

April 4: On the 22nd day of the protest, the Tamil Nadu High Court gave judgement waiving farmers loan in cooperative banks.

April 10: After 28 days, a group of farmers led by Ayyakannu reportedly went to the Prime Minister's Office (PMO) to send a memorandum, but they were not given access. They jumped out of the vans on their way back to Jantar Mantar and stripped off their clothing. The farmers protesting were soon arrested. Some of the farmers also rolled naked on the road as they were pulled away by police. Ayyakannu who was leading the protests told the media. "The Prime Minister declined to meet us, which is why we're running naked. This is our miserable state, look at our pathetic state."

April 14: After 32 days of the protest, the farmers dressed up as women wearing sarees to get the attention of Prime Minister Narendra Modi and audiences. They wore sarees and beat their chests and cried out to display their opposition.

April 15: During their 33rd day at protest, the farmers wore mangalsutras around their necks. They started singing funeral songs and screamed at the Prime Minister Narendra Modi to come and make a visit to their grief stricken women and pay attention of their sufferings. Screaming the name of Narendra Modi, the farmers cut Mangalsutra to show the pain of the widows of farmers.

April 16: The Dravida Munnetra Kazhagam (DMK) organized an all-party meeting and called for a state wide bandh on April 25 to highlight the issues of the farmers. The AIADMK and the Bharatiya Janata Party were not invited. 500,000 hotels and food joints all across Tamil Nadu were set to participate in the Bandh. Around 55,000 sand lorries were set to not operate in the bandh.

April 22: 38 days into the protest, the protesting farmers drank their urine in protest. Ayyakannu who led the protest stated "This is our hopelessness. Who wants to sit in this heat and drink urine in Delhi? We are powerless and we have been compelled to do this by the government. In Tamil Nadu, we do not get water to drink, and Modi has ignored our thirst." They also said they would eat their feces on the weekend if their demands are not addressed. A demonstration was held were a man wearing a mask of Narendra Modi whipped the protestors to show what they were going through.

April 23: after Tamil Nadu's Chief Minister Edappadi Palanisamy met them and agreed to address their problems, the farmers temporarily stalled their protests. They also said they would resume their protests in a bigger way on May 25 if their demands were not met.

April 25: The DMK and other opposition parties organized demonstrations all across Tamil Nadu. DMK's M.K Stalin was arrested, Shops, hotels were shut down and government busses stopped along the roads. Police have been mobilized in large numbers to avoid any adverse events in major locations across the state. Earlier the DMK also accused the BJP-led central government of not being bothered about the protests.

June 9: The farmers resume their protest at Delhi.

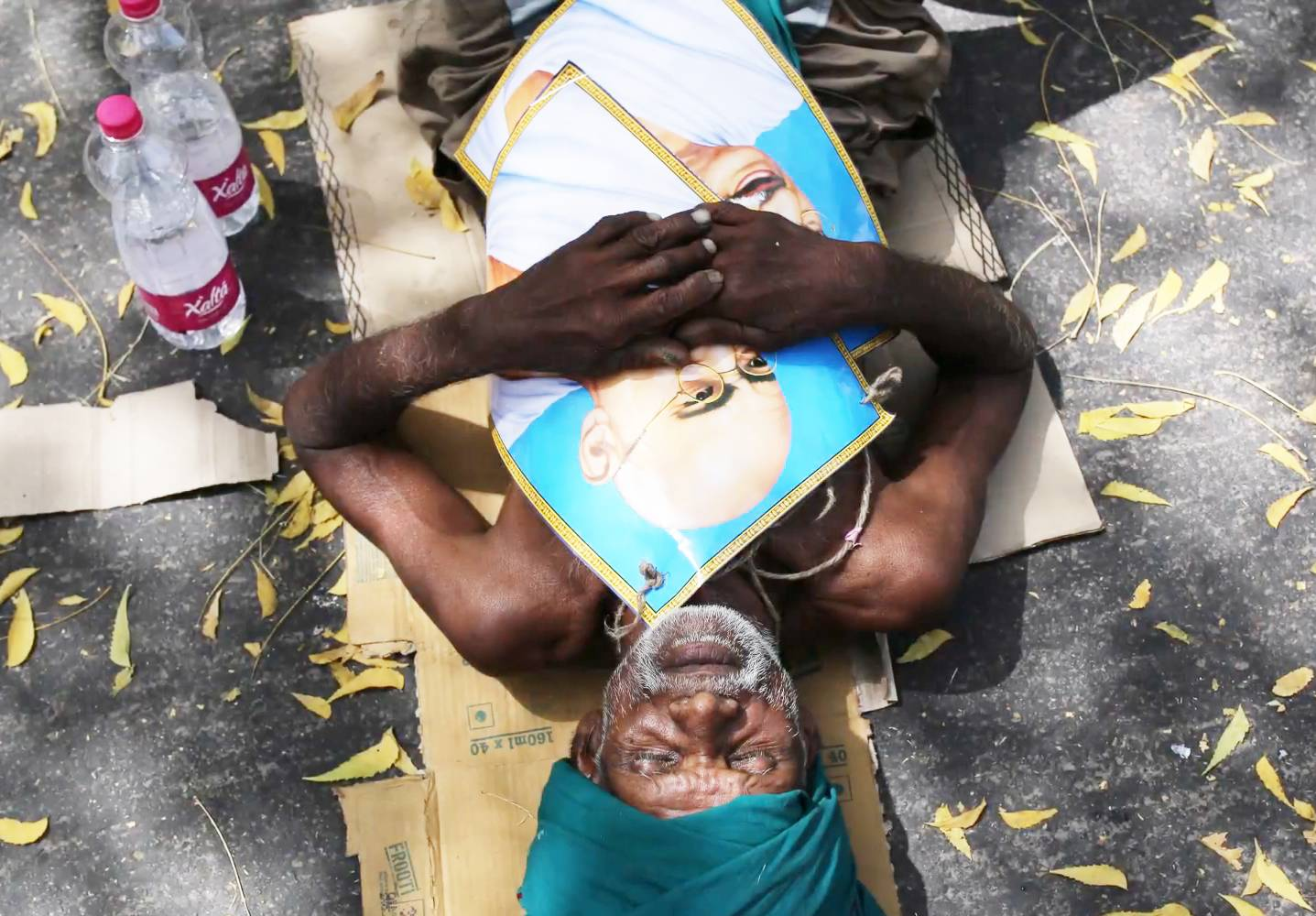
A farmer taking rest

July 7: Approximately 70 farmers were arrested when they tried to perform a demonstration near the Prime Minister's house in Race Course Road. Later they were taken to the Parliament Street Police Station.

August 29: The farmers ate raw meat to show their protest.

September 11: The farmers ate human excreta and also threatened to march naked to Prime Minister Narendra Modi's office and also eat human flesh.

September 12: The farmers completed their 100 days of protest and said they would continue until their demands were met.

September 18: After 107 days of protests, Ayyakannu the President of South Indian Rivers Inter-Linking Farmers Association who led the protests stated that more than 141 farmers were hospitalized during the protests.

October 26: The farmers returned after completing their protests as the rainy season and beginning of winter left most of its members sick. Ayyakannu spoke to the media that more than 5 lakh farmers from all across the country will march to Delhi on November 20, 2017 to corner the Bhartiya Janata Party-led NDA Government. He also claimed that the Chief Minister Eddapadi Palaniswami betrayed them by not keeping his words.

The food for the farmers were prepared by volunteers belonging to the Delhi Sikh Gurdwara Management Committee (DSGMC). The committee claimed that the food was delivered two times to the farmers by the committee.
