= JAGO-Jag Aasra Guru Ott (Jathedar Santokh Singh Ji) =

JAGO Jag Aasra Guru Ott (Jathedar Santokh Singh Ji)
- Abbreviation: JAGO
- Leader: Manjit Singh GK
- General Secretary: Dr.Parminder Pal Singh
- Founded: Manjit Singh GK
- Headquarters: Delhi
- Student wing: JAGO Students Wing
- Youth wing: JAGO Youth Wing
- Women's wing: JAGO Kaur Brigade

Election symbol
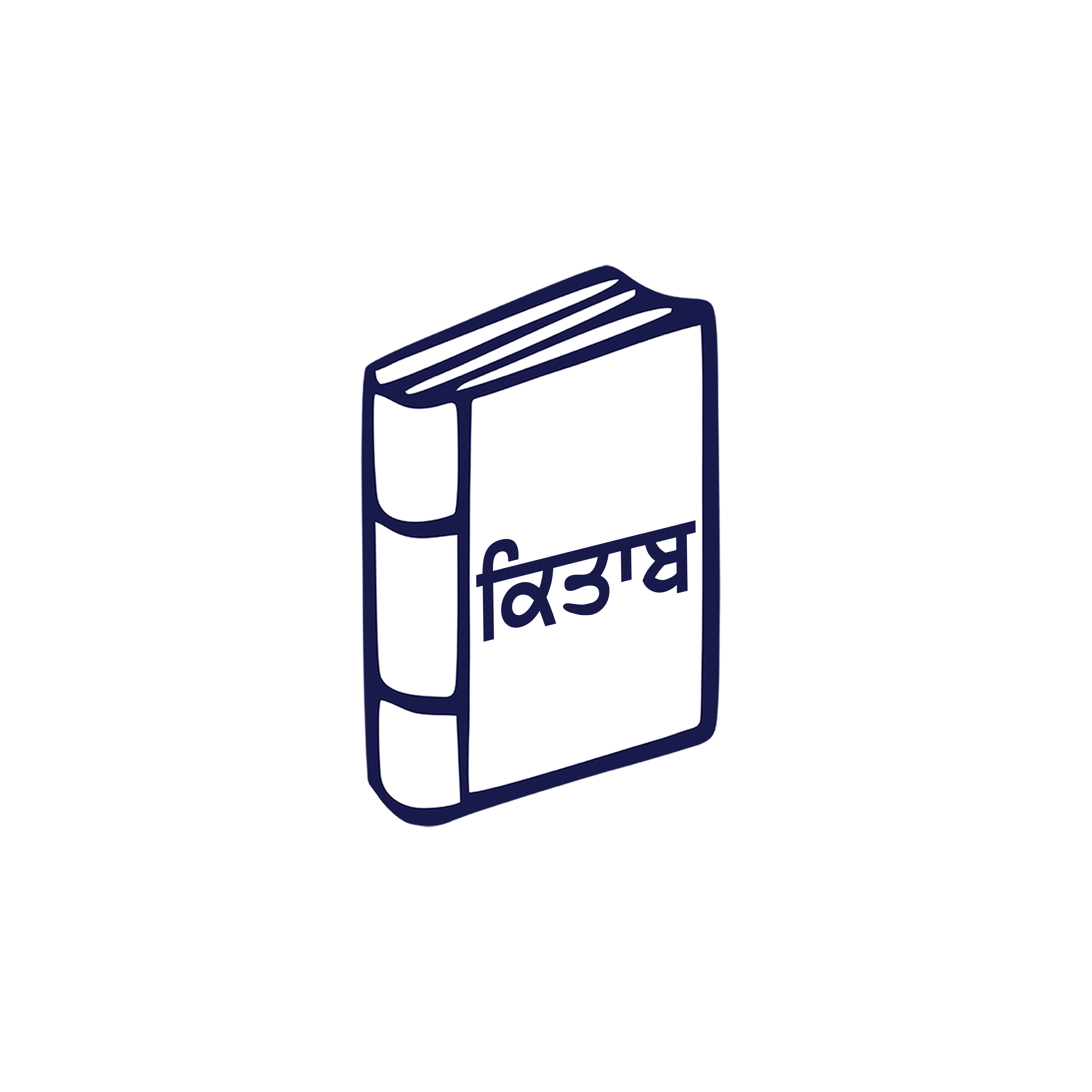

Website
- jagoparty.org

JAGO-Jag Aasra Guru Ott (Jathedar Santokh Singh Ji) is a Sikh religion base Religious Party in National Capital Territory of Delhi in 2019.

== Formation Of New Religious Party ==
Jathedar Santokh Singh ji may have been involved in the high command of Shiromani Akali Dal, but he left no stone unturned to create a separate identity for the Sikhs of Delhi. He continued to pressurize the Akali Dal high command to settle the Religious issues of the sect together but allow freedom to work for the Sikhs settled outside Punjab in the princely region. Jathedar Manjit Singh G.K. Taking this path, first formed Shiromani Akali Dal Panthak and registered its presence by winning 6 seats in the 200 7 Delhi Committee elections. In 2008, Shiromani Akali Dal (Badal) chief Sardar Sukhbir Singh Badal visited Sardar Manjit Singh GK's house and offered to take over the Delhi unit of the Akali Dal. After which the party won a big victory in the committee elections of 2013 and 2017 under the leadership of Sardar Manjit Singh GK. But after clashing with the Akali Dal's thinking on Panthak issues, Sardar Manjit Singh on 2 October 2019 brought into existence a religious party named "Jago Jag Asra Guru Ott (Jathedar Santokh Singh)" and announced that his party would No member will take part in any political elections and will fight in front of national issues.

== See also ==
- 2021 Delhi Sikh Gurudwara Committee elections
