= Sahajdhari =

Follower of Sikhism

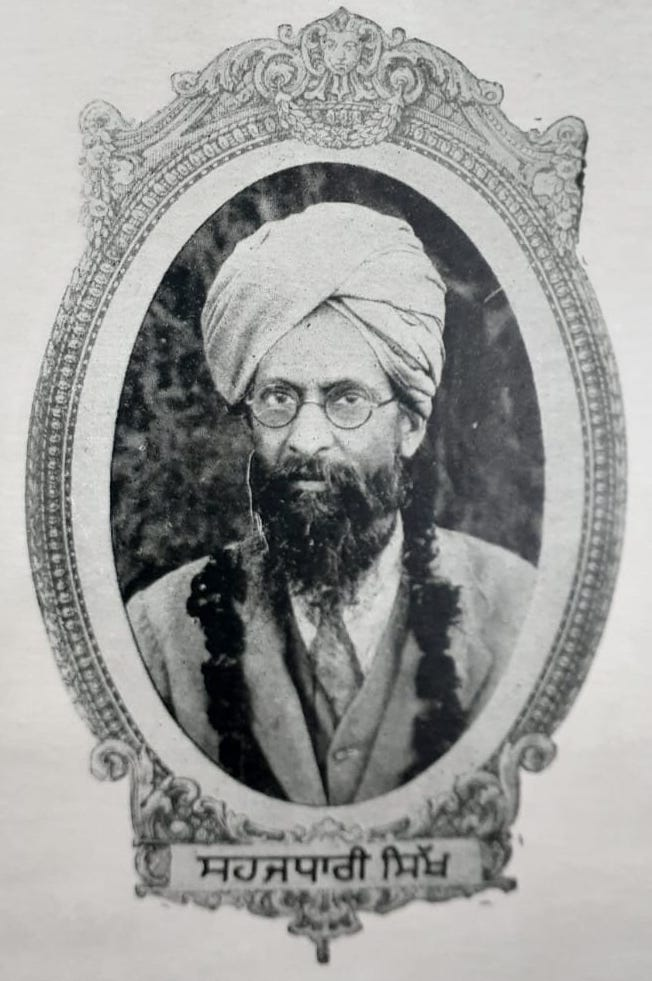
Photograph of a Sehajdhari Sikh (also spelled 'Sahajdhari') from the 1930 first edition of Kahn Singh Nabha's Mahan Kosh

A Sahajdhari or Sehajdhari (Punjabi: ਸਹਜਧਾਰੀ (Gurmukhi); meaning "spiritual state of equilibrium adopter") is an uninitiated Sikh. Another early term is Khulasa, as opposed to the Khalsa. A Sahajdhari adheres to the principles of Sikhism and the teachings of the Sikh Gurus but may not wear all of the Five Symbols of Sikhism. For example, Sahajdhari Sikhs often wear a kara, but many of them cut their hair (kesh).

Despite it being instructed by Guru Gobind Singh for Sikhs to become Amritdhari during the formation of the Khalsa, in modern times, particularly in the western world some Sikhs have chosen to cut their hair or beard.

According to the Delhi Sikh Gurdwaras Act of 1971 and the Shiromani Gurdwara Parbandhak Committee, a Sahajdhari Sikh can be regarded as a Sikh. However, they cannot claim to be an Amritdhari Sikh and must raise their children within the Sikh faith.

== Etymology ==
Sahajdhari is a compound word consisting of the two words sahaj and dhari. In Sanskrit and other Indo-Aryan languages, the words Sahaj means "spiritual state of equilibrium" and dhari means "adopter".

== Meaning ==
A Sahajdhari believes in all the tenets of Sikhism and the teaching of the Sikh Gurus but has not undergone Amrit Sanchar, and may not always follow every Sikh practices all the time as Amritdhari Sikhs are expected to. According to the Shiromani Gurdwara Prabandhak Committee, the Sahajdhari Sikhs are those who believe in the Gurus of Sikhism.

According to W. H. McLeod, a Sahajdhari Sikh refers to someone who reveres the Sikh Gurus but does not seek initiation into the Khalsa. Another term, keshdhari, is related and often used synonymously, albeit confusingly, and strictly-speaking refers to a Sikh who maintains uncut hair (kesh) but has not received amrit, which would make them amritdharis if so. McLeod estimates that keshdhari make up a substantial portion of the Sikh population. Whilst all amritdharis are keshdharis, not all keshdharis are amritdharis.

== Classification of Sikhs ==
According to W. H. McLeod, there are four main types of Sikhs, two of which keep uncut hair and wear turbans and two of which generally do not. The different groups can be distinguished based upon their clothing and their personal degree of adherence to the rahit. The four main groups of the Sikhs are:

1. Keshdharis: those who maintain uncut hair. This is the popular image of Sikhs, as they generally keep at-least some of the five Ks, usually kesh and a kara, though some may also keep a kanga and kirpan (especially a miniature one). Some maintain the rehit very strictly whilst others try to avoid transgressing it when in the public-gaze but they all generally accept it. Some men of this group may trim their beard. They constitute a substantial proportion of the Sikh population, especially in the Punjab homeland, although it would be impossible to give a reliable estimate on their share of the Sikh population.
2. Amritdharis: those who have undertaken the Amrit Sanskar initiation into the Khalsa and thus maintain the 5 Ks strictly. They keep Singh and Kaur in their names. They may constitute around 15–18% of the Sikh population.
3. Sehajdharis: this type of Sikh generally does not keep uncut hair and are gradualist Sikhs. They may reject other aspects of the rehit and may not keep traditionally Sikh names but rather Hindu-inflected ones. Once interpreted as meaning "slow-adopter", referring to Sikhs who were working toward becoming Khalsa Sikhs but not one, it is more likely the term derives from the word sahaj as used by Guru Nanak, which refers to "ineffable bliss of the soul’s liberation". Sehajdhari Sikhs are often of a relatively high-caste background (mostly trading-castes and rarely Jats) who want to maintain their status as they are concerned of adhering to the rehit, which may challenge their position. Some sehajdhari families only raise their eldest son explicitly as a Sikh while giving the rest of their children freedom to assume either a Hindu or Sikh identity. This label was traditionally often applied to Khatris and Aroras who were Sikhs but did not follow the Khalsa practice of maintaining the 5Ks.
4. Monas: no proper term has been coined for this group, they may be called mona ("shaven") but this term can be interpreted as offensive and it does not properly distinguish them from the sehajdhari group. It refers to Sikhs who are of a traditional keshdhari familial background but they choose to cut their hair and do not adhere to Sikh principles strictly but they usually have Singh or Kaur in their name still. They will wear a special kind of headwear when visiting gurdwaras. This fourth group is especially prevalent in the Sikh diaspora.

All amritdharis are keshdharis but not all keshdharis are amritdharis. However, keshdharis who are not amritdharis still consider themselves Khalsa Sikhs, despite not undergoing its baptismal ritual.

The 18th century Bansavalinama by Chhibber divides Sikhs into four types:

- Historical Sikhs were divided into two types:
  - didāri, Sikhs who lived amongst the gurus
  - muktay, Sikhs who were martyred for the religion
- Contemporary Sikhs were divided into two types:
  - murīd, devoted Sikhs who attributed all their wealth and power as being bestowals from the guru, venerated the guru, and who served the sadh, sangat, or Sikhs.
  - māiki, egotistical Sikhs who did not venerate the guru, such as the Guru Granth Sahib, after acquiring power and did not serve the sadh, sangat, or Sikhs.

== History ==
According to sources, Bhai Nand Lal asked Guru Gobind Singh ji how many types of Sikhs there are, and Guru Gobind Singh ji replied, saying, ਤਿਨ ਪ੍ਰਕਾਰ ਮਮ ਸਿੱਖ ਹੈ।। ਸਹਜੇ ਚਰਨੀ ਖੰਡ।।. In the early eighteenth century when Sikhs defied the persecutors and courted martyrdom as did the teenage Haqiqat Singh Rai, who was beheaded in public for his refusal to disown his Sikh belief and accept Islam. Haqiqat rai was Sahajdhari Sikh. A leading Sahajdhari Sikh of that time was Kaura Mal, a minister to the Mughal governor of Lahore, Mu'in ul-Mulk (1748–53), who helped the Sikhs in different ways in those days of severe trial. He had so endeared himself to them that they called him Mittha (sweet, in Punjabi) Mall instead of Kaura (which, in Punjabi, means "bitter") Mall. Sikh tradition also recalls another Sahajdhari Sikh of this period, Des Raj, who was entrusted by the Khalsa with the task of reconstructing the Harimandar, which was demolished by the Afghan invader Ahmad Shah Durrani in 1762. Sikh tradition also recalls another Sahajdhari sikh, Dina Nath, who was the Sikh Empire minister. Sikh tradition also recalls another Sahajdhari Sikh, Bhai Vasti Ram, a learned man well-versed in Sikh scriptures, who enjoyed considerable influence at the court.

Sahajdhari Sikhs have continued participating in Sikh life right up to modern times, and have associated themselves with Sikh institutions and organizations such as the Shiromani Gurdwara Parbandhak Committee, Chief Khalsa Diwan, Shiromani Akali Dal, and the All-India Sikh Students Federation. The Singh Sabhas used to have seats on their executive committees reserved for the Sahajdharis. Among their own societies, confined mainly to north-western India prior to the migrations of 1947, were the Sahajdhari Committee of Multan, Guru Nanak Sahajdhari Diwan of Panja Sahib and Sri Guru Nanak Sahajdhari Jatha of Campbellpore. The Sahajdhari Diwan of Panja Sahib attained the status of their central forum. They had as well their annual conference, which met for its first session on 13 April 1929 under the chairmanship of Sir Jogendra Singh, who passed on the office to the famous Sikh scholar and savant, Bhai Kahn Singh. A Sahajdharis' conference formed part of the annual proceedings of the Sikh Educational Conference. The Ad-Dharmis of colonial Punjab can also be described as a type of sehajdhari Sikhs.

The Sahajdharis share all of the religious, and social customs and ceremonies with the main body of the Sikhs, and join their congregations in the gurdwaras. The population in the Punjab of Sahajdhari Sikhs (another name used is Sikh Nanakpanthis) according to the 1891 Census was 397,000 (20% of the total Sikh population); according to the 1901 Census, 297,000 (13% of the total Sikhs); according to the 1911 Census, 451,000 (14.9% of the total Sikhs); according to the 1921 Census, 229,000 (7% of the total Sikhs); according to the 1931 Census, 282,000 (6.5% of the total Sikhs). Outside of Punjab, the North-West Frontier Province and Sindh had considerable Sahajdhari populations. Consequent to the partition of India in 1947, Sahajdharis became widely dispersed in the country. Their India-wide forum was the Sarab Hind (All-India) Sahajdharis Conference, which rotated from town to town for its annual sessions. Three of its presidents, Gur Darshan Singh, Sant Ram Singh and Ram Lal Singh Rahi, the founding Executive Vice President of Sarab Hind (All-India) Sahajdharis Conference, were recognized with the "Nishan-e-Khalsa" award by the Anandpur Foundation at the Tercentennial Celebration of Khalsa in 1999.

== Five Ks ==
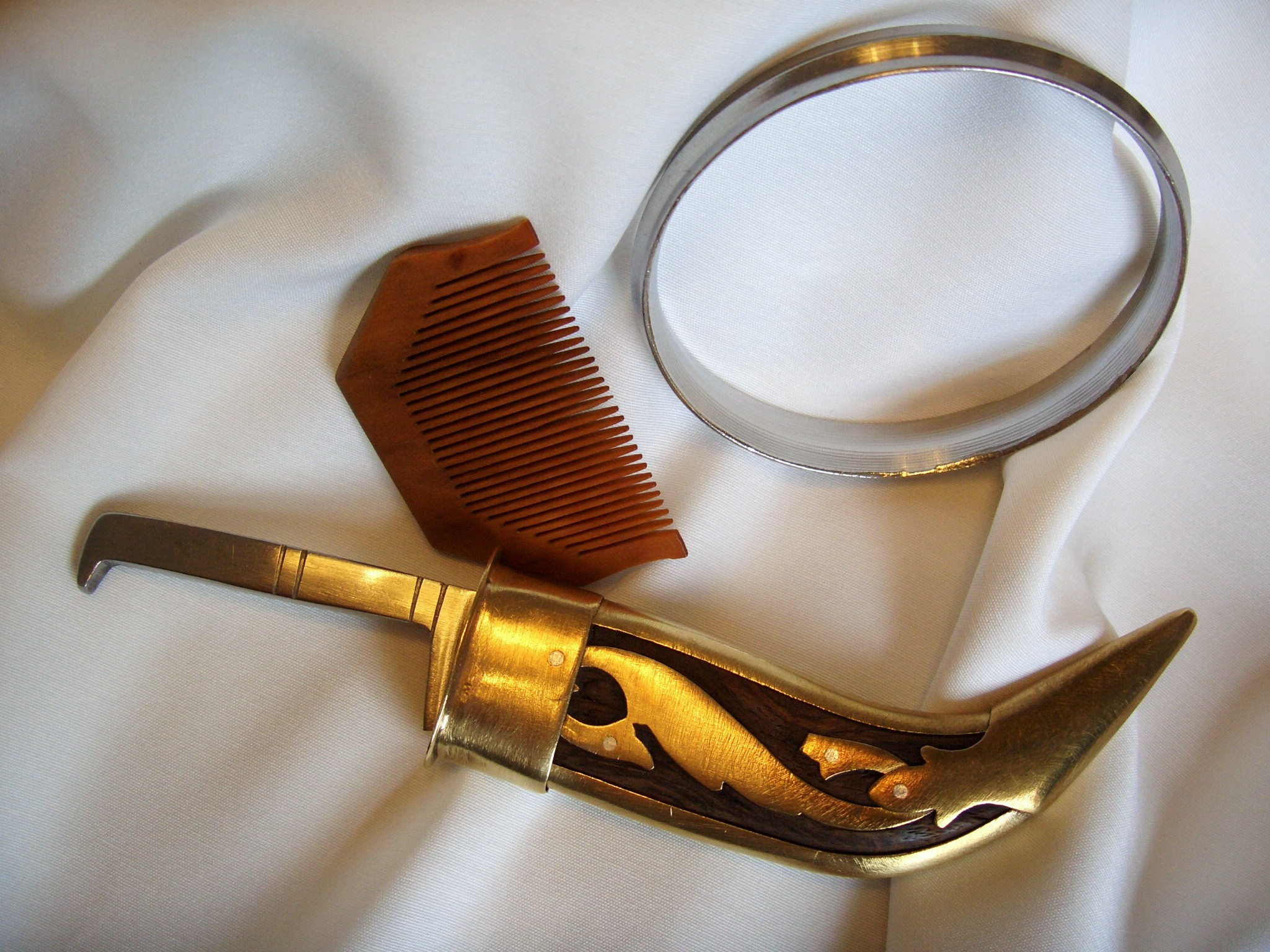
Kanga, Kara and Kirpan – three of the five articles of faith endowed to the Sikhs.

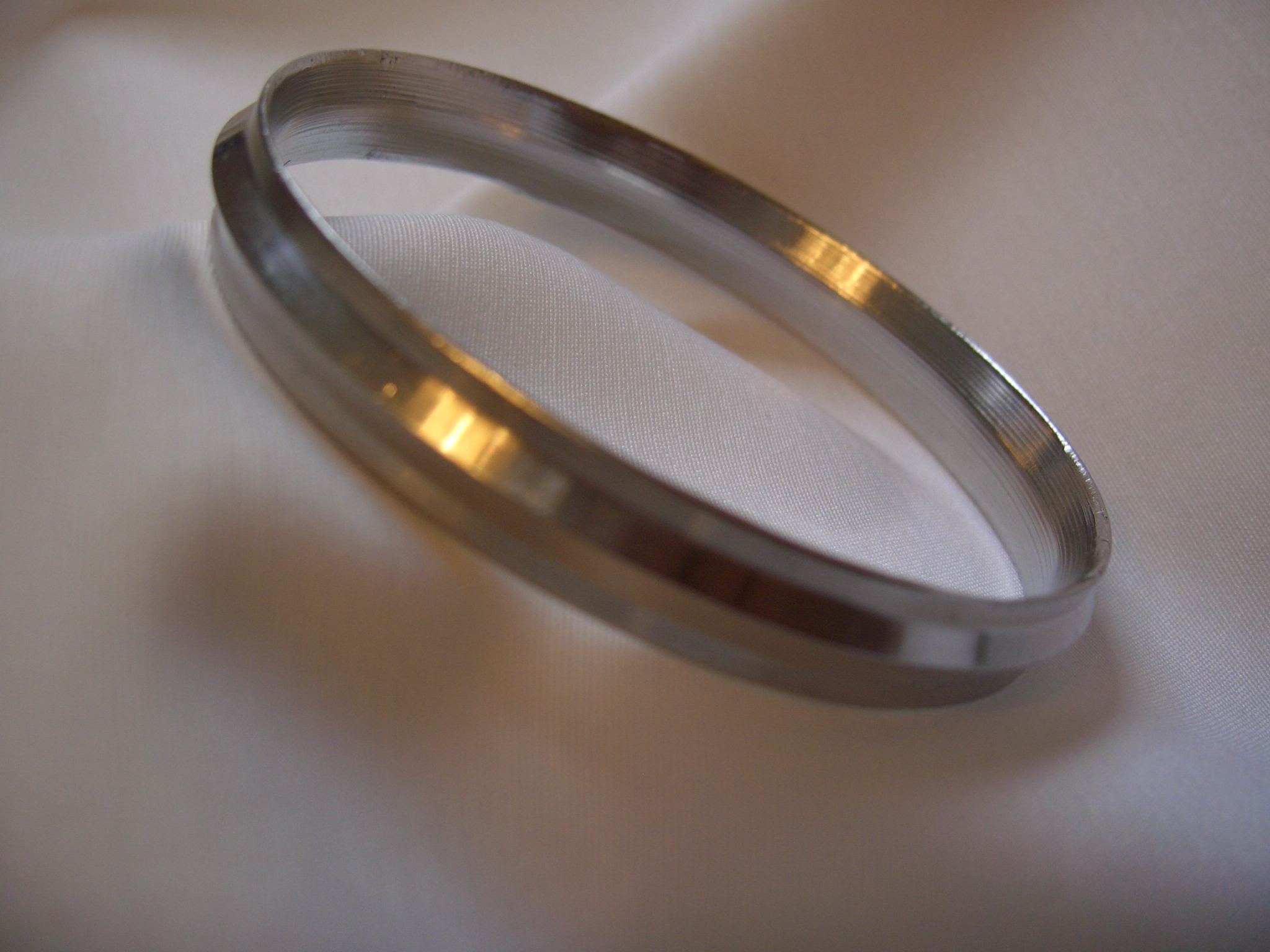
Most Sahajdhari Sikhs keep the Kara as one of their Five Ks

The Five Ks, or panj kakaar/kakke, are the five items of faith that all initiated Sikhs (Amritdhari) are required to wear at all times (but does not apply to Sahajdhari Sikhs), at the command of the tenth Sikh Guru, Guru Gobind Singh, who so ordered at the Baisakhi Amrit Sanskar in 1699. They are:

- Kesh (uncut hair)
- Kanga (wooden comb)
- Kacchera (specially-designed underwear)
- Kara (iron bracelet)
- Kirpan (strapped sword)

They are for the identification and representation of the ideals of Sikhism, such as honesty, equality, fidelity, meditating on God, and never bowing to tyranny.

== Sikh sects dominated by Sehajdharis ==
The following Sikh sects are dominated by sehajdhari gradualist Sikhs:

- Udasis
- Jagiasi-Abhiasi
- Sewapanthi
- Bandais
- Nirmalas
- Nirankaris
- Nanakpanthi

== Contemporary notable Sahajdharis ==
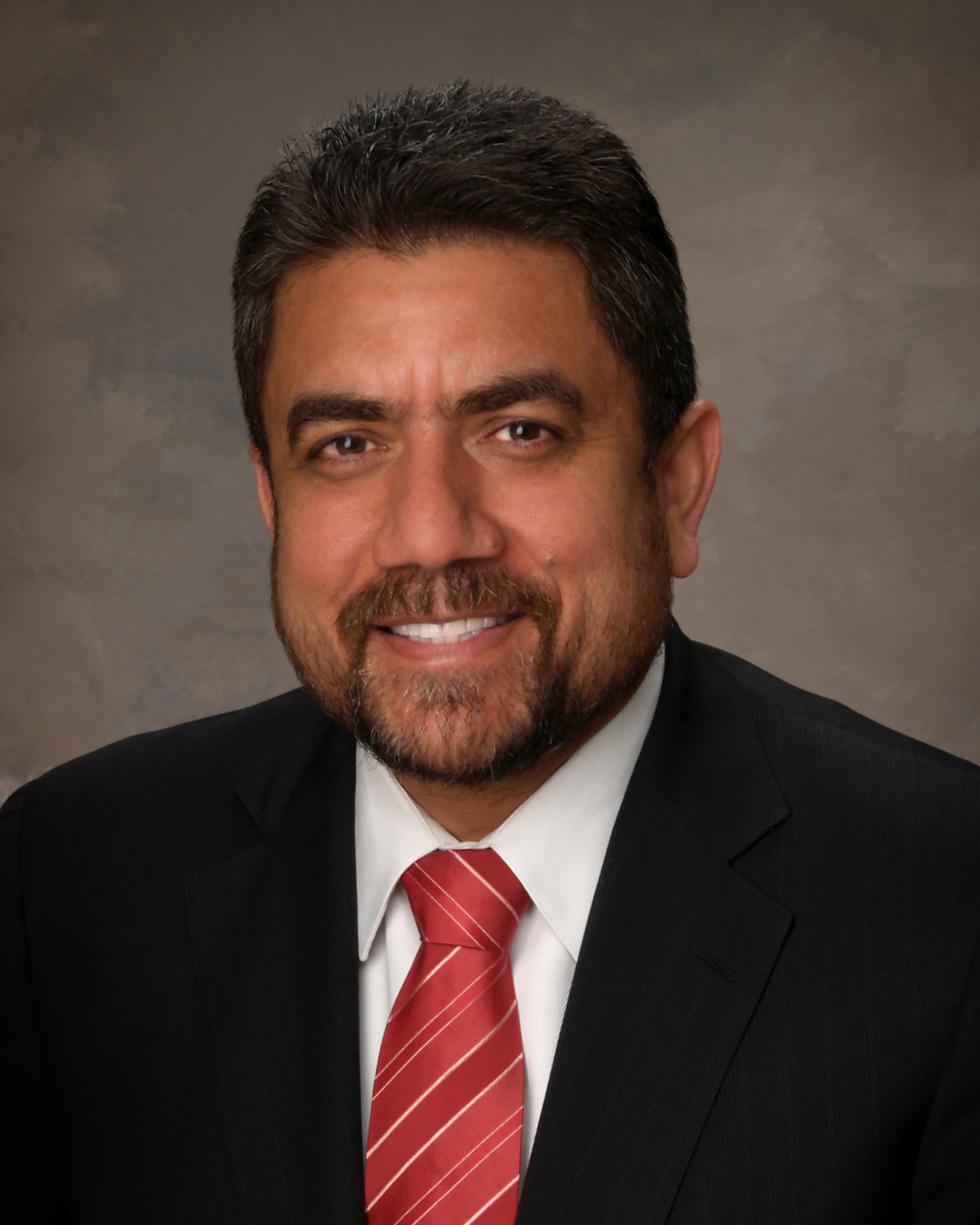
Canadian Sahajdhari Sikh politician Sukh Dhaliwal with his hair and beard trimmed

- Bhai Ram Lal Singh Rahi – Now an Amritdhari Sikh, was the founding Executive Vice President of Sarab Hind (All-India) Sahajdharis Conference, recognized with the "Nishan-e-Khalsa" award by the Anadpur Foundation at the Tercentennial Celebration of Khalsa in 1999.
- Deep Sidhu – Sikh youth leader
- Udham Singh – Indian independence freedom fighter
- Hardeep Grewal – Canadian MPP
- Harry Bains – Canadian politician
- Sukh Dhaliwal – Canadian MP
- Nav (rapper) – Canadian rapper

== See also ==
- Khalsa
- Prohibitions in Sikhism
- Gurmata
- Gurmukh
- Manmukh
- Patit
