= Anand Karaj =

Sikh marriage ceremony

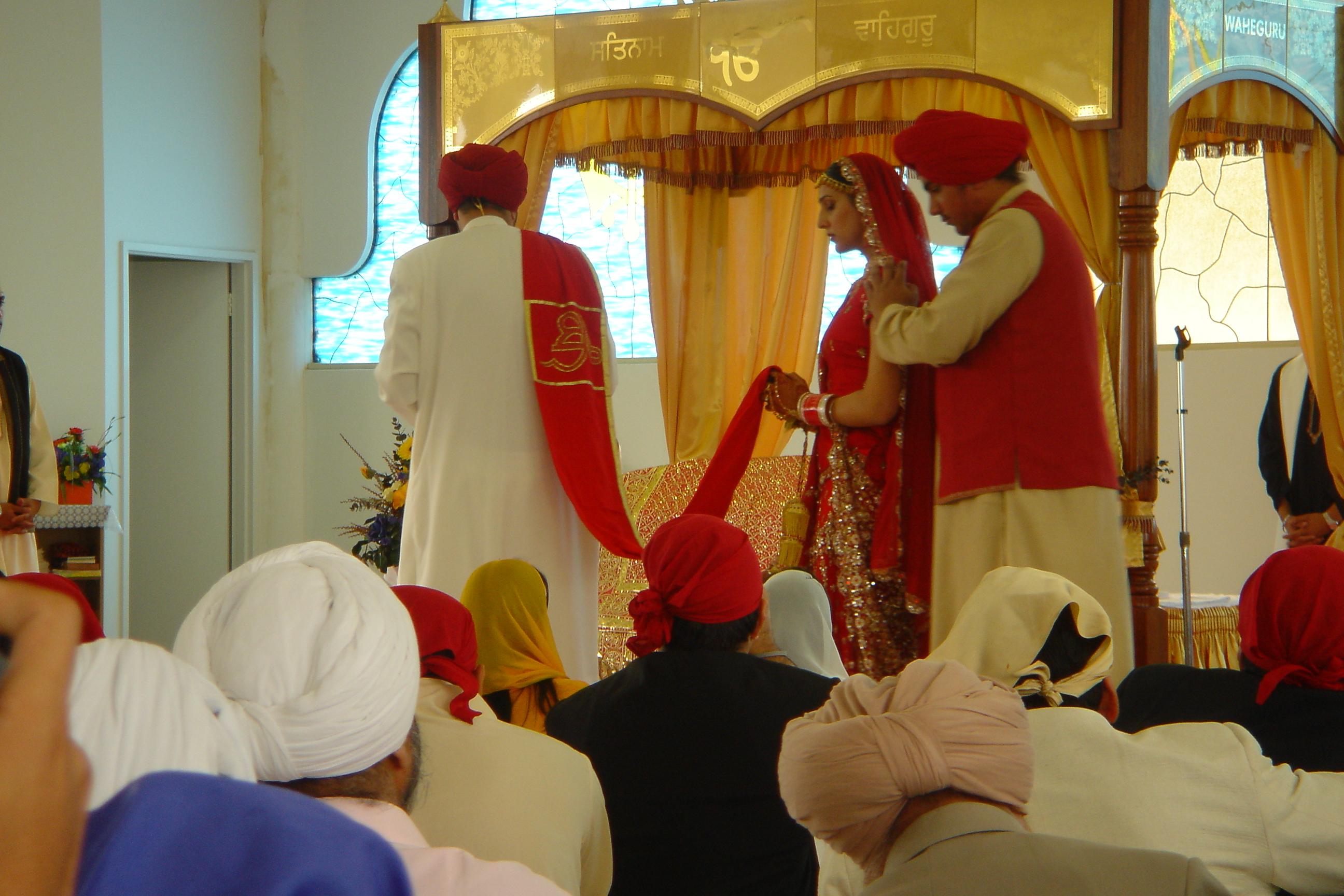
A Sikh couple taking Laavaan during the ceremony

Anand Karaj ( Punjabi: ਅਨੰਦ ਕਾਰਜ, romanized: ənənd kārəj ) is the Sikh wedding ceremony, meaning "Act towards happiness" or "Act towards happy life", that was introduced by Guru Amar Das. The four laavaan (hymns which take place during the ceremony) were composed by his successor, Guru Ram Das. Although the recitation of Guru Amar Das' stanzas in Sikh ceremonies is a historical and enduring tradition, the practice of circumambulating around the Guru Granth Sahib to conduct a marriage ceremony is a relatively recent innovation that supplanted the tradition of circumambulating around the sacred fire (havan) in the early twentieth century.

Within the community, Anand Karaj is governed by the Sikh Reht Maryada (Sikh code of conduct and conventions) that was issued by the Shiromani Gurdwara Prabandhak Committee (SGPC). In a recent verdict of the Akal Takht, a Hukamnama, Anand Karaj can only take place in a Gurdwara (Sikh temple). In subsequent statements, Sikh authorities have reiterated this position, reaffirming that Anand Karaj ceremonies should be conducted only in Gurdwaras and not at destination or resort venues. Any Amritdhari (baptized) Sikh may perform the marriage ceremony.

Anand Karaj weddings are legally recognized by the governments of India and Punjab, Pakistan.

== History of the Anand Karaj ==
The history of the Anand marriage ceremony is traced back to the time of Guru Amar Das (1479–1574), who composed the long 40-stanza hymn "Anand", in the Ramkali measure, suitable to be sung or recited on all occasions of religious importance. His successor Guru Ram Das composed a four-stanza hymn, "Lavan", which is recited and sung to solemnize nuptials. During the time of Maharaja Ranjit Singh and his successors, however, this ceremony fell into partial disuse under the renewed Brahmanical influence at court as well as in society.

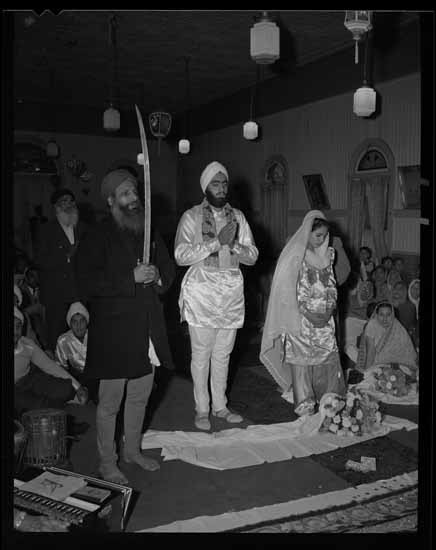
Sikh wedding, photographed by Leon (Lee) Holt, The Province, B.C., Canada, September 1952

The Nirankari reform movement of the mid-19th century made the practice of the Anand ceremony a vital plank in its programme as did the later, more widely influential Singh Sabha. It is claimed that founder of the Nirankari movement, Dayal Das, resuscitated the ritual of marrying in the attendance of the Guru Granth Sahib and reading the lavan, also known as marriage hymn. His own marriage took place according to Sikh rites in 1808, whereas his son, Darbara Singh is accredited for having performed the first marriage ceremony circumambulating around the Guru Granth Sahib during the reading of marriage hymns on 13 March 1855, as it is practiced by Sikhs today. W.H McLeod states that the Sikh marriage ceremony prior to Nirankari and Singh Sabha machinations, was essentially a Hindu one; although the recitation of Guru Amar Das' composition, Ramkali Anand, was a long-held tradition, the marriage ceremony was completed with the circumabulation around the sacred fire. According to Harjot Singh Oberoi, there was considerable intercaste and intracaste variation in the ceremonial customs of the Sikhs prior to the Tat Khalsa's emergence. Among the Jat Sikhs, a Nai or Brahmin purohit would act as an intermediary initiating negotiations possibly leading to a marriage agreement between the bride and groom households. The date of the marriage would be fixed by astrologers after consulting their horoscopes. Ostentatious displays of loud music and dancing would often be observed in the days preceding the wedding along with the worship of the planets and propitiation at ancestral shrines. The event would conclude with the bride and groom circumambulating around the sacred fire, with the officiating Brahmin reciting verses from holy scriptures. The Tat Khalsa, viewing these rituals as antithetical to Sikh precepts, wrote numerous manuals on the proper conduct of Sikh marriage customs between 1884 and 1915 and demurred against the British legal requirement for Sikhs to be married according to Hindu rites. These books, while ubiquitously renouncing the existing customs, disagreed among themselves on the historical origins of proposed changes and the correct steps within certain rites to be undertaken. They called for the pretermission of Brahmin and astrologer involvement, and asked for the Adi Granth to be the object of veneration, as opposed to the sacred fire. The changes were a radical departure from the marriage traditions observed hitherto. Initially observed by only a small segment of the Sikh population, these changes were gradually legitimized after acceptance by the larger Sikh public, through endorsements from leading Sikh newspapers and the ratification of the Anand Marriage Act in 1909. According to Tanweer Fazal, the Tat Khalsa also intended to encumber Hindu-Sikh marriages which were frequent in Punjab during the time; the Anand Marriage Act only sanctioned marriages between confirmed Sikhs, hence an interfaith marriage conducted through the Anand Karaj would be invalidated by the law. Oberoi goes on to write that the Sanatan Sikh movement, whilst concurring with the Tat Khalsa's repudiation of Brahmin intervention, opposed the substitution of the sacred fire with the Guru Granth Sahib, claiming that there was no evidence of the Sikh gurus observing the Anand marriage rituals and that the Sikh scriptures like the Dasam Granth and the Gur-Bilas only mentioned weddings performed by the circumambulating around a fire. The Tat Khalsa opposed this claim by tracing back the Anand ceremony to Guru Ram Das. W.H. McLeod tentatively concluded that there is no evidence that marriages performed by circumambulating around the Adi Granth was observed or sanctioned by the Gurus, but rather, a result of the Tat Khalsa's ardent efforts to establish a separate identity from Hinduism. There is negligible information on the conduct surrounding marriage ceremonies in historical rahit-namas, an exception to this - the Prem Sumarg, an early nineteenth-century text said to reflect the contemporary religious milieu marked by a preponderant Hindu influence among the Sikh masses, stipulated that the wedding ceremony was to be officiated by a Khalsa Sikh, and after the couple was declared married, they would circumambulate around the sacred fire four times while the lavan were sung. One Sikh sect, Namdhari, still require the couple to circumambulate around the sacred fire four times.

Indeed, before the intervention of the Singh Sabha there was no uniform Sikh wedding ritual. The majority of Sikhs were married by the vedi tradition whereby circuits (pheras) were taken around the fire, as in the Hindu manner. In October 1909, the Anand Marriage Act was legalized. From then on, Sikhs were to be married by taking four pheras around the Guru Granth Sahib.

— Opinderjit Kaur Takhar, Sikh Identity: An Exploration of Groups Among Sikhs

The core of the Anand Karaj (the 'blissful ceremony') is the 'lavan', wherein shabads are sung with the bride and groom circumambulating the Guru Granth Sahib. The ceremony serves to provide the foundational principles towards a successful marriage and also places the marriage within the context of unity with God. Guru Ram Das composed the four stanzas of Lavan to be sung and recited as the core of the Anand Karaj.

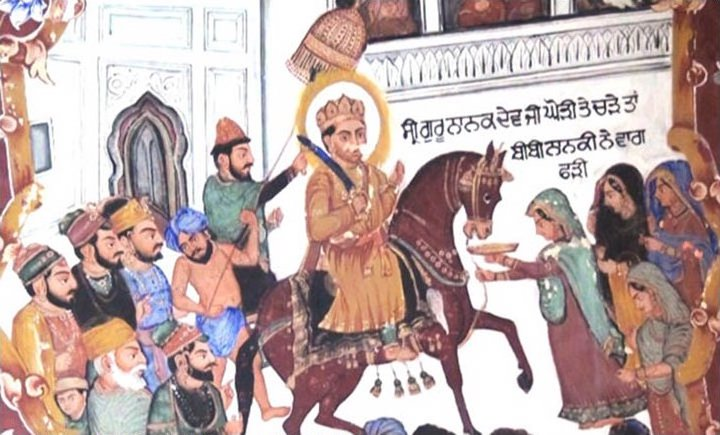
Fresco depicting the Baraat ceremony of Guru Nanak's wedding to Mata Sulakhni, from Gurdwara Baba Atal, ca.1890s

The ceremony is now universally observed by the Sikhs. Punjabi Sikh weddings often incorporate elements from traditional Punjabi weddings, such as a kurmai (engagement ceremony) and baraat (procession).

== Sikh marriage legislation ==
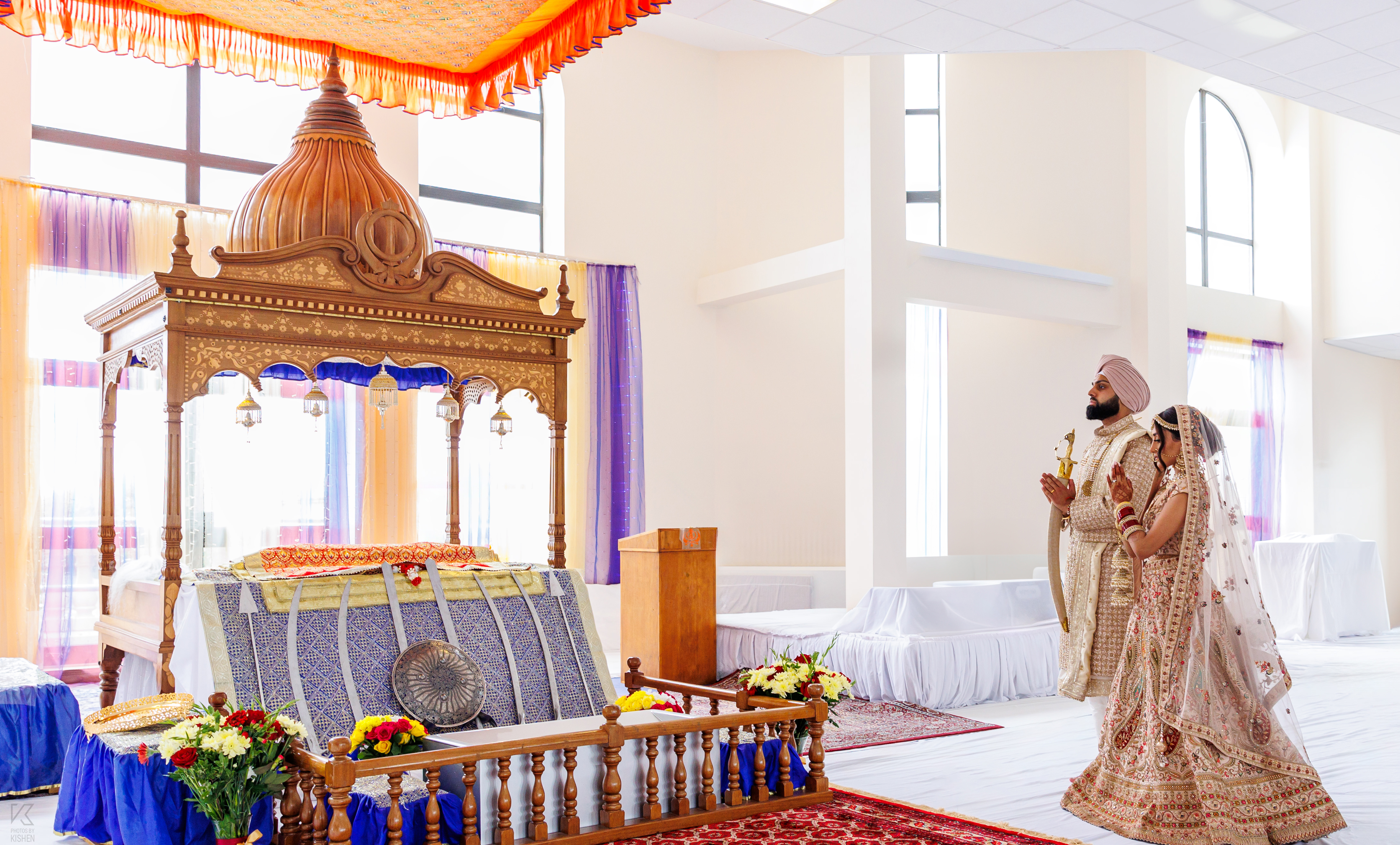
Modern photograph of a Sikh Bride and Groom after their Sikh wedding ceremony

=== The Anand Marriage (Amendment) Act, 2012 (India) ===
In 2012, India passed The Anand Marriage (Amendment) Bill, after which Sikhs are able to register their marriages under the Anand Karaj Marriage Act instead of the Hindu Marriage Act, with President Pratibha Devi Singh Patil giving her assent to a bill passed by Parliament on 7 June 2012 in the budget session.

The Assent of the President of India was received to the Anand Marriage Amendment Act 2012 on 7 June 2012. The Act paved the way for the validation of Sikh traditional marriages, amending the Anand Marriage Act of 1909, thus providing for compulsory registration of "Anand Karaj" marriages. According to the amendment bill, couples whose marriages have been registered under this act will not be required to get their marriage registered under the Registration of Births, Marriages and Deaths Act, 1969, or any other law for the time being in force. Anand Karaj is not recognized in the UK, and a legal English marriage is mandatory.

=== Punjab Sikh Anand Karaj Marriage Act (Pakistan) ===
As of 2024, Sikhs living in Punjab, Pakistan are able to register their Anand Karaj marriages with the Pakistani government.

== Anand Karaj of a Sikh with a non-Sikh ==
In 2014 the Sikh Council in UK developed a consistent approach towards Anand Karaj in Gurdwaras where one partner is not of Sikh origin, following a two-year consultation with Gurdwara Sahib Committees, Sikh Organisations and individuals. The resulting guidelines were approved by the General Assembly of Sikh Council UK on 11 October 2014, and state that Gurdwaras are encouraged to ensure that both parties to an Anand Karaj wedding are Sikhs, but that where a couple chooses to undertake a civil marriage they should be offered the opportunity to hold an Ardas, Sukhmani Sahib Path, Akhand Path, or other service to celebrate their marriage in the presence of family and friends. Some gurdwaras permit Anand Karaj of non-Sikhs, which has led to controversy.
