= 2023 Kaveri water dispute protests =

Dispute on Cauvery river water sharing

2023 Kaveri water sharing protests
- Part of the Kaveri River water dispute
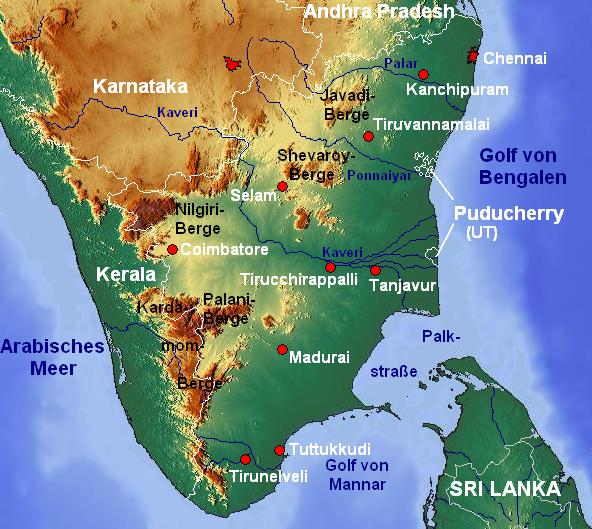
- Cauvery river flows into Karnataka state and then into the Tamil Nadu state
- Date: August 2023 (3 years ago)
- Location: Karnataka, India
- Caused by: Karnataka's refusal to release more Cauvery water amid drought
- Goals: Stop releasing more water to Tamil Nadu
- Methods: Gherao (encirclement), dharna (sit-in), raasta roko (traffic obstruction), demonstration, strike, counterlegislation
- Status: Ongoing

Parties
Government of Karnataka: Karnataka Farmers' Association; Supporting political parties: Bharatiya Janata Party, Karnataka; Aam Aadmi Party	Government of Tamil Nadu: Tamil Nadu Farmers' Association; Supporting political parties: Dravida Munnetra Kazhagam; All India Anna Dravida Munnetra Kazhagam

Lead figures
Siddaramaiah; Basavaraj Bommai; Arvind Kejriwal	M. K. Stalin; P. Ayyakannu

Number
unverified until 29 September 2023 2,000(according to The Hindu)	

Casualties
- Arrested: 50
- Detained: >700
- Economic loss: Estimates of up to ₹4,000 crore (US$420 million)

The 2023 Kaveri River water sharing protests are a series of ongoing protests on the issue of water sharing problems from the River Kaveri between Tamil Nadu and Karnataka which are two states in India. The water dispute between Karnataka and Tamil Nadu resurfaced in 2023, with both states demanding a greater share of the river's water. The dispute has been ongoing for decades, and has often led to protests and violence.

In August 2023, Tamil Nadu requested that Karnataka release 24,000 cusecs of Cauvery water per day. However, Karnataka refused, citing a deficit in rainfall and a drought-like situation in the state. The Cauvery Water Management Authority (CWMA) then stepped in and directed Karnataka to release 5,000 cusecs of water per day for 15 days. Karnataka reluctantly complied, but has since refused to release any further water. Tamil Nadu has filed a contempt petition against Karnataka in the Supreme Court, alleging that the state is violating the court's orders. The Supreme Court has asked the CWMA to submit a report on the situation.

== Background ==
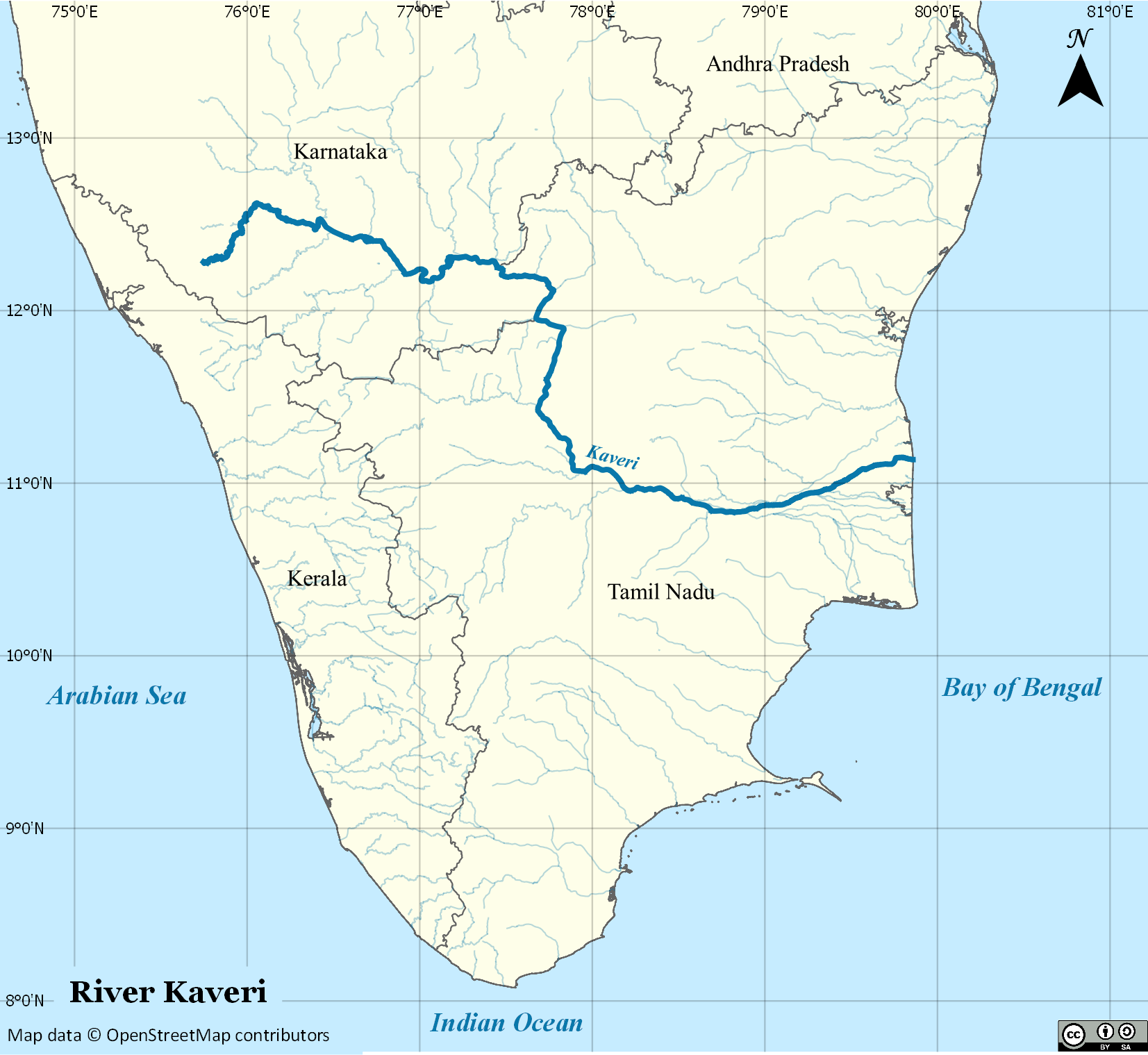
Map of the Kaveri River basin

The genesis of this conflict rests in two agreements in 1892 and 1924 between the Madras Presidency and Kingdom of Mysore. The 802 kilometres (498 mi) Cauvery river has a 44,000 km^{2} basin area in Tamil Nadu and 32,000 km^{2} basin area in Karnataka. The inflow from Karnataka is 425 TMC ft whereas that from Tamil Nadu is 252 TMCft.

However the Karnataka state does not agree with the sharing of drinking water with the South Indian state, Tamil Nadu, which has been followed according to the British era agreement. The state also believes that the British agreement is a very old one and needs to be renewed because of the rainfall patterns. Karnataka desperately wanted to receive more water share from the River Cauvery and this would ultimately reduce the share of water to South Indian states such as Tamil Nadu, Puducherry and Kerala. Due to these arguments this has been the unsolved issue between the two states in the recent times.

On the other hand, there have been numerous criticisms and controversies regarding Karnataka and Tamil Nadu in the past, as the state has failed to deliver an expected water level to Tamil Nadu in the previous years due to draught despite the court order which has advised the Karnataka government to supply the amount which is expected by Tamil Nadu. Whereas Tamil Nadu has often demanded its complete share without considering the facts of insufficient rains and drought situation in Karnataka.

== Development ==
In August 2023, Tamil Nadu requested Karnataka to release 24,000 cusecs of Cauvery water per day, citing a severe drought and the need to irrigate crops. However, Karnataka refused, citing its own water shortage. The Tamil Nadu government asked Karnataka to release 24,000 cusecs of water from the Cauvery River each day to support standing crops, but the Supreme Court declined to issue any orders in response. protests erupted across Karnataka, with agitators demand that Karnataka stop releasing more water.

In September 2023, the Cauvery Water Management Authority (CWMA) directed Karnataka to release 5,000 cusecs of water per day for 15 days. Karnataka reluctantly complied, but refused to release any further water after the 15-day period expired.

In September 2023, Tamil Nadu filed a contempt petition against Karnataka in the Supreme Court, alleging that the state was violating the court's orders. The Supreme Court has asked the CWMA to submit a report on the situation. The Karnataka government announced on Friday that it would appeal the Cauvery Water Management Authority's (CWMA) decision to provide 3,000 cusecs of water per day to Tamil Nadu until October 15 and that it would do so on Saturday.

The Karnataka government has defended its decision to withhold water, arguing that it is doing so in order to protect its own farmers. The government has also said that it is willing to negotiate with Tamil Nadu to find a mutually agreeable solution.

== Protests ==
=== Tamil Nadu ===
In September 2023, Farmers in Trichy engaged in an unexpected form of protest against Karnataka and the federal government by calling for the release of Cauvery water from Karnataka to Tamil Nadu. In protest of the ongoing issue with Karnataka, farmers carried dead rats in their mouths. The demonstration in Trichy is being led by Ayyakannu, president of the Tamil Nadu branch of the National South Indian River Interlinking Farmers' Association.

On October 1, 2023, farmers from the Thanjavur, Thiruvarur, and Nagapattinam regions gathered at the Thiruvarur railway station, significantly halting train services to highlight their concerns. PR Pandian, a well-known member of the Tamil Nadu Cauvery Farmers Organization, led the demonstration.

=== Karnataka ===
In August 2023, Protests erupted in Karnataka over the Karnataka government's to stop releasing more Cauvery water to Tamil Nadu.

In September 2023, The CWMA directs Karnataka to release 5,000 cusecs of water per day for 15 days. After that protesters block roads and railways in Karnataka to demand that the state government not release any more water to Tamil Nadu.

In October 2023, As per report, the activist wrote the letter to the prime minister to alert him to the problem. A large number of people are protesting in Karnataka because water is being released from the Cauvery to Tamil Nadu. The Prime Minister has been mute on the Cauvery water-sharing problem, according to TA Narayana Gowda. All Karnataka Rakshana Vedike members are currently sending letters to the prime minister in blood. In addition, 10,000 of our karyakartas will travel to Delhi on October 9 to protest at Jantar Mantar.

Karnataka bandh

A Karnataka bandh (transl. Karnataka Strike) was called by pro-Kannada organizations and farmers' outfits on Friday, September 29, 2023, to protest the release of Cauvery water to Tamil Nadu. The bandh was observed in Bengaluru and other southern parts of the state.

The bandh disrupted normal life, with schools and colleges closed and traffic affected. Protestors blocked roads and railways, and some clashed with police. 44 flights to and from Bengaluru airport were cancelled. Malls, shopping centres, and commercial establishments remained closed. Several people were detained from various parts of the state in connection with the protests.

The Karnataka government had imposed prohibitionary orders under Section 144 of the Criminal Procedure Code in Bengaluru Urban, Mandya, Mysuru, Chamarajanagara, Ramanagara, and Hassan districts, and declared a holiday for schools and colleges there.

The bandh was called in response to the CWMA's order to release 5,000 cusecs of water per day to Tamil Nadu for 15 days. Pro-Kannada organizations and farmers' outfits have argued that Karnataka is facing a severe water shortage and that the state cannot afford to release more water to Tamil Nadu.

The 2023 Cauvery protests in Bengaluru had a significant impact on the city's tech sector. Many multinational companies, including Walmart, Alphabet's Google, and Amazon, asked their employees to work from home on the days of the protests to avoid disruptions. This led to a significant drop in productivity and revenue for some companies. The protests caused traffic congestion and other logistical challenges for tech workers and businesses. Some companies even had to shut down their offices early on the days of the protests. The state government is thought to have lost 250 crores of rupees as a result of the bandh, which caused transactions worth 1,500 crores of rupees to cease. Beyond the immediate losses, this one-day bandh has an impact. On Friday, September 29, Karnataka is preparing for yet another state-wide bandh. This will stop industrial production and commercial activity. The state is anticipated to lose more than 4,000 crores of rupees during this forthcoming bandh, with a GST loss of more than 450 crores, of which 60% will be ascribed to Bengaluru.

According to media reports, a total of 785 protesters were detained across Karnataka on the day of the bandh. The highest number of detentions were reported in Bengaluru, with over 100 protesters being taken into custody. Other major cities where protesters were detained include Mandya, Mysuru, and Hubli. The protesters were detained for a variety of reasons, including blocking roads, shouting slogans, and disrupting public transportation. Most of the detainees were released later in the day, but some were held overnight.

== Reactions ==
Tamil Nadu

Tamil Nadu Chief Minister MK Stalin has called on the Karnataka government to release at least 24,000 cusecs of water per day to Tamil Nadu. He has also threatened to take legal action against Karnataka if the state does not comply with the CWMA's orders.

Tamil Nadu Farmers' Association President P Ayyakannu has called on the Karnataka government to release all of the Cauvery water that is due to Tamil Nadu. He has also threatened to launch a hunger strike if the state does not comply.

Karnataka

Karnataka Former Chief Minister Basavaraj Bommai has defended the state's decision to withhold water, arguing that it is necessary to protect Karnataka's own farmers. He has said that the state is willing to negotiate with Tamil Nadu to find a solution, but that any solution must be fair to both states.

Others

Kejriwal and Mukhyamantri Chandru, the state president of the Aam Aadmi Party (AAP), attended the protest against release of water to Tamil Nadu.
