= Laavaan =

Sikh hymns

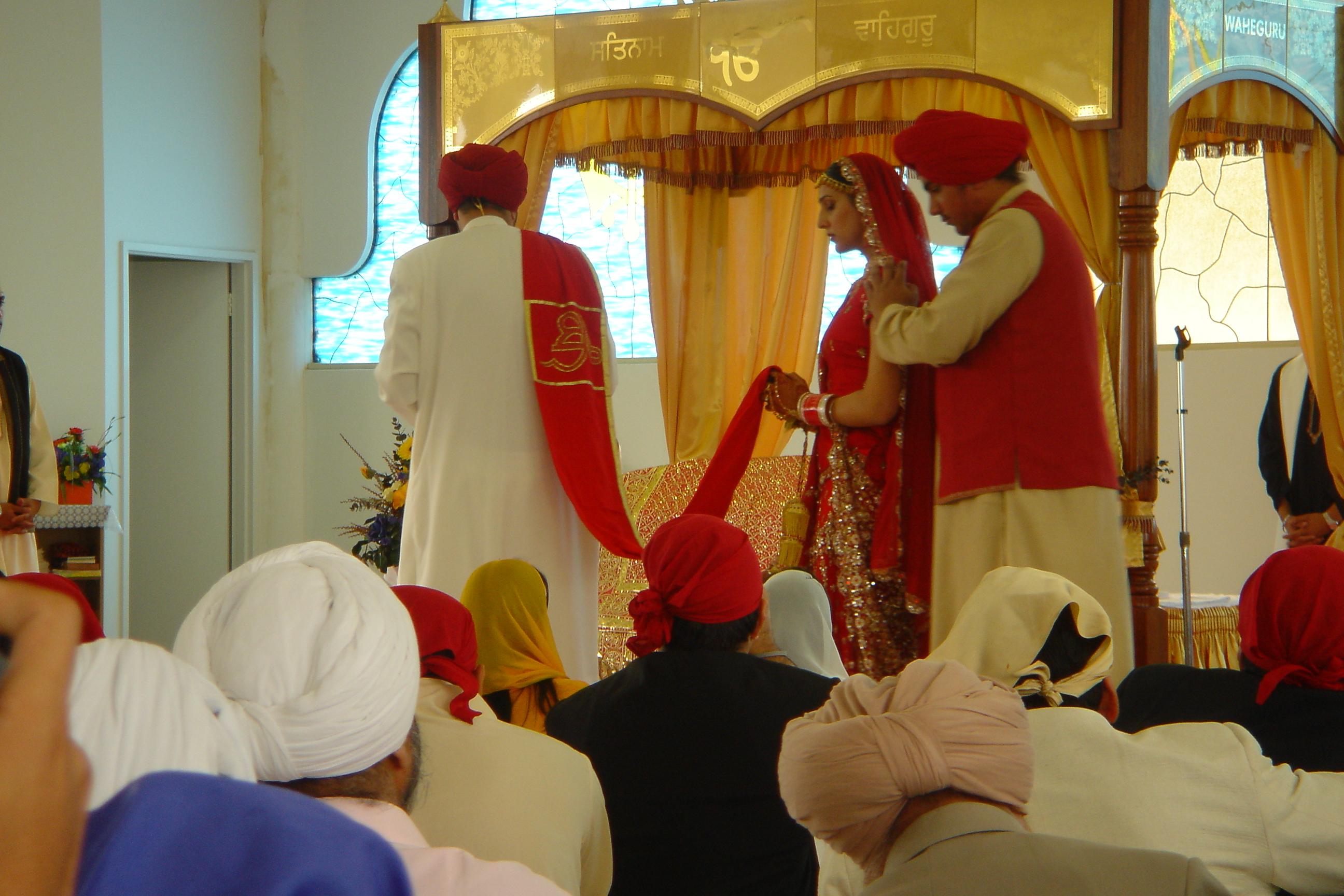
A Sikh couple taking Laavaan during the ceremony

The laava phere (Punjabi: ਲਾਵਾਂ ਫੇਰੇ (Gurmukhi); singular laav; ਲਾਵਾਂ), also known as Lavan, are the four hymns of the Anand Karaj (Sikh wedding ceremony) which form the main part of the wedding ceremony. The four hymns are from the Guru Granth Sahib, the Sikh holy scriptures and appear on Ang 773 to 774 of the total of 1430. The Laavaan Shabad was written by the Fourth Guru, Guru Ram Das.

Guru Amar Das Ji explains in Ang 788 of the Sri Guru Granth Sahib the meaning of marriage to a Sikh couple: "They are not said to be husband and wife who merely sit together. Rather they alone are called husband and wife, who have one soul in two bodies."

The four laava give the Sikh couple spiritual guidance for their life ahead. The Guru tells of the four spiritual stages of married life and how the couple as a team have to first begin by following the path of righteousness and sinless-ness. Secondly to only have fear of the Lord and remove the ego from within the souls; then to remember and sing the Lord's name with the holy congregation. Finally, the couple will find divine peace; come to accept the Will of the Lord and find unending happiness in the Lord.

== Meanings ==
The main part of the Anand Karaj (Sikh Marriage Ceremony) is the reading and then the singing of each laav. While the laav is sung, the couple, joined by a piece of cloth, circle the Guru Granth Sahib. When the couple circle the Guru Granth Sahib each time they are making a commitment to God with the Guru as their spiritual witness and support. The couple is reminded that the Guru should be the center of their lives 'world ocean'. The Sri Guru Granth Sahib is the spiritual center and the Sadh Sangat is the worldly (temporal) witness and support.

The four nuptial rounds were written by Guru Ram Das for his own wedding. They explain the journey of the souls toward the Almighty. In them he tells us of the duties that a person undertaking a life of marriage should perform. In the first round, the Guru asks the partners to:

- Commit to righteousness.
- Renounce sinful actions.
- Remember, mediate and embrace Naam.
- Only by good fortune, is real peace obtained and Lord seems sweet to the mind.
- Worship the one Waheguru and all your sins will vanish.

In the second round, the Guru asks the partners to advance further towards meeting the True Guru - God:

- The Lord leads you to meet the True Guru, the Primal Being - the enlightener
- Have fear of fearless God and your ego will disappear
- Sing God's praises and feel God's presence before you.
- God is everywhere, outside and within, sing in Joy

In the third round, the Guru says that the partners mind is filled with "Divine Love":

- Meeting the Sadh Sangat (Holy Congregation)
- Speak the Word of the Lord's Bani.
- Which is only obtained by good fortune
- Recite Gurbani and sing the Glorious Praises of the Lord
- The Naam will vibrate and resound within your heart
- And you will know your future destiny.

In the final round, the Guru says that the partners mind become peaceful and they will have found the Lord:

- God's Will seems sweet to these Gurmukhs.
- You will lovingly focus your consciousness on the Lord, day and night
- All your desires will be fulfilled
- The Souls will blend with Waheguru and only Naam will occupy your heart.

== See also ==
- Mangal phera
