= Guru Harkrishan Public School =

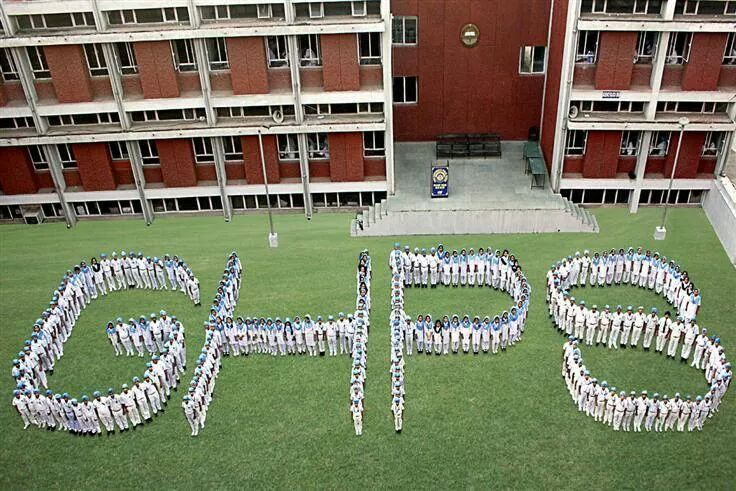
- GHPS, Vasant Vihar branch
- India

Information
- Type: Co-educational English medium school
- Motto: "Vidya Vichari Tan Parupkari" which means "He is learned indeed, who does good to others"
- Established: July 19, 1965
- Founder: Delhi Sikh Gurdwara Management Committee
- Principal: Dr. GANDHI JI
- Website: ghpsvv.edu.in

Guru Harkrishan Public School or GHPS, New Delhi, India, is a chain of co-educational, senior secondary schools, affiliated to the Central Board of Secondary Education (CBSE). It imparts an education inspired by the life and teachings of the Sikh Gurus. It was among the first in the chain of schools established by the Delhi Sikh Gurdwara Management Committee in 1965, which today has 12 branches in Delhi, giving education to more than 20,000 students.

== History ==
Guru Harkrishan Public School, India Gate, Vasant Vihar and Kalka Ji are the three English medium co-educational senior secondary schools affiliated to the Central Board of Secondary Education. The schools have provision for all academic streams – Science, Computer Science, Commerce and Humanities.

GHPS India Gate was established by Delhi Sikh Gurudwara Management Committee on July 19, 1965 as the first in the chain of Guru Harkrishan Public Schools, followed by GHPS Vasant Vihar in 1974. The GHPS chain today has 12 branches in Delhi providing education on public school lines to more than 20,000 students.

The school motto is "Vidya Vichari Tan Parupkari" which means "he is learned indeed, who does good to others".

== Branches ==
- Guru Harkrishan Public School, Hargobind Enclave, Delhi
- Guru Harkrishan Public School, Hari Nagar, Delhi
- Guru Harkrishan Public School, Fateh Nagar, Delhi
- Guru Harkrishan Public School, India Gate, Delhi
- Guru Harkrishan Public School, Kailash Colony, Delhi
- Guru Harkrishan Public School, Kalkaji, Delhi
- Guru Harkrishan Public School, Karol Bagh, Delhi
- Guru Harkrishan Public School, Shahdara, Delhi
- Guru Harkrishan Public School, Punjabi Bagh, Delhi
- Guru Harkrishan Public School, Nanak Piao, Delhi
- Guru Harkrishan Public School, Tilak Nagar, Delhi
- Guru Harkrishan Public School, Vasant Vihar, Delhi

== Facilities ==
- AV room with a TV, VCR, IBM compatible projector, mike and radio system.
- Laboratories for all branches of science.
- Computer science and informatics are offered to the students as elective Board subjects at the senior secondary level. The school has a Computer-cum-Multimedia Centre.
- Library equipped with computer and internet systems. It has around 15,000 books, children's magazines, journals and reference books.
- Uniform shop and book shop.
- Extension counter of the Punjab and Sind Bank is situated on the school premises. Parents and students can deposit money directly into the bank.
- Health check-up. A doctor visits the school every day to attend to the minor ailments of students and to provide first aid in case of emergency. A thorough medical check-up of all the students is done once a year and reports are sent to parents.
- Medical room with medical facilities and first aid items.
- Fleet of its own buses for educational tours and excursions.
- Canteen where snacks, cold drinks and ice creams are sold rates during the breaks. A canteen committee composed of the school doctor and senior teachers controls the food quality.
- The school also has a gurudwara in it where children can pray and seek God's grace
- Well trained peons and sweepers
- Special section. The school also offers education to the students who are weak in studies. Some children were able to gain knowledge and study with normal students

== Notable alumni ==
- Aditya Dhar, film director (Vasant Vihar)

== See also ==
- List of schools in Delhi
