= Vasant Vihar =

- Sub-division
- Area in Delhi, India
- Coordinates: 28.5574°N 77.159°E
- Country: India
- State: Delhi
- District: New Delhi

Government
  - Body: South Delhi Municipal Corporation

Languages
  - Official: Hindi, Punjabi, and English
- Time zone: UTC+5:30 (IST)
- Vehicle registration: DL-12
- Nearest city: Delhi
- Lok Sabha constituency: New Delhi
- Vidhan Sabha constituency: R K Puram
- Civic agency: MCD

Vasant Vihar is a diplomatic and residential sub-division of the New Delhi district of Delhi, India. It is located near the diplomatic area of Chanakyapuri, and houses over 50 diplomatic missions of foreign countries, including the High Commission of South Africa, and embassy of Argentina.

== History ==
In 1959, the Central Government Servants Cooperative House Building Society (CGSCHBS) was formed and land was allocated by the Government of India on 99 years lease basis. This region was carved out of the Villages of Basant Gaon which was acquired by the government during the 1960s. The acquired area, Vasant Vihar and its smaller sister area Shantiniketan, were developed as per a master plan by the Central Public Works Department of the Government of India. The land was plotted in sizes mainly ranging between 400 to 2000 sq. yards and were allotted to the members of the cooperative (CGSCHBS). Thereafter, bungalows were built and both Vasant Vihar and Shantiniketan developed into posh residential colonies.

== Locality ==
The four main streets in Vasant Vihar are Munirka Marg, Vasant Marg, Poorvi Marg and Paschimi Marg, literally Eastern and Western Street. These form a rough triangle that encloses much of the neighbourhood. The neighbourhood is primarily residential and, when first planned, consisted of six blocks named A to F, with each block having its local market. Vasant Vihar has several parks in every block. The demographic of Vasant Vihar is primarily composed of wealthy business families, senior government officials, and high-net-worth individuals, contributing to its status as one of Delhi’s most exclusive neighbourhoods.

== Education ==
Vasant Vihar also has schools such as Modern School, Delhi Public School (Junior Branch), The Shri Ram School (Junior Wing), Tagore International School, Guru Harkrishan Public School, Holy Child Auxilium School (Senior branch), Chinmaya Vidyalaya, Suraj Bhan DAV Public School, and Sarvodaya School.

== Economy ==
The corporate office of Hero MotoCorp, formerly Hero Honda, is at Basant Lok in Vasant Vihar. In 1996, Vasant Vihar witnessed the opening of India's first McDonald's restaurant. It was also the first McDonald's restaurant in the world not to serve beef and pork-based products.
