= Gurdino =

Gurdino ("giving to the gurus"; also spelt as Gurudino) was a traditional practice of some Hindu families living in Punjab, Sindh, and Balochistan to raise a child, usually the eldest son, as a Sikh. The son would be baptized as a Sikh. The tradition had been followed for centuries. Households that followed the tradition tended to follow both Hindu and Sikh practices.

During Islamic-rule in Punjab, Hindus raising a child as a Sikh would have been similar to preparing their child to fight in a war, as Sikhs were conceptualized as being the "sword arm of Hinduism". The present understanding of the historical prevalence of this practice amongst the Punjabi Hindus may be exaggerated and it was followed less in-reality. In Punjab during the British colonial-period, the practice was generally done for economic motivations rather than religious ones, based upon aspirations for admissions into the military, as Sikhs were preferred for these roles. According to W. H. McLeod, it was a practice of sehajdhari Sikh families, especially belonging to the trading-castes, who only raised their eldest son explicitly as a Sikh whilst giving the rest of their children the freedom to assume either a Sikh or Hindu identity.
