= Haryana Sikh Gurdwara Management Committee =

Organization responsible for the upkeep of Sikh temples in Haryana, India

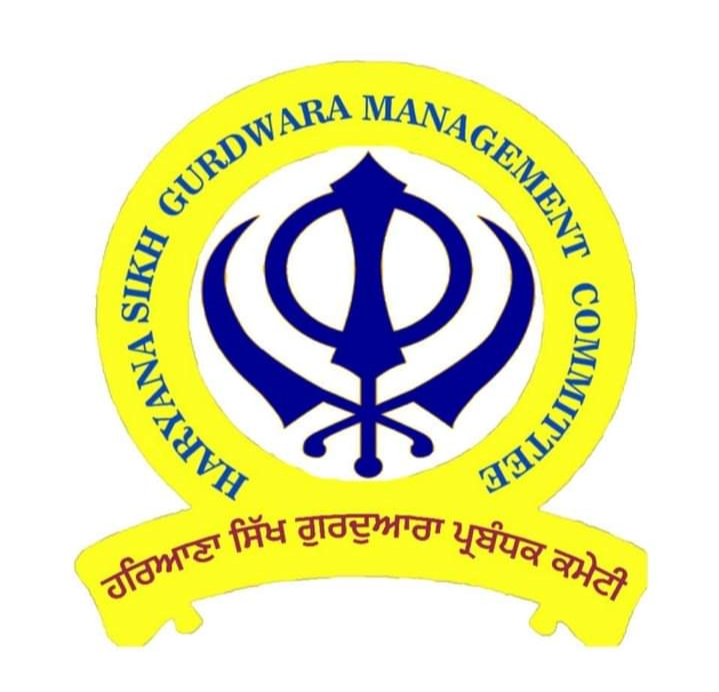
- HSGMC logo
- Abbreviation: HSGMC
- Formation: 2014
- Type: management organisation
- Headquarters: Kurukshetra
- Location: Haryana, India
- President: Mahant Karamjeet Singh Yamunangar
- Website: hsgmc.com

The Haryana Sikh Gurdwara Management Committee (Punjabi: ਹਰਿਆਣਾ ਸਿੱਖ ਗੁਰਦੁਆਰਾ ਪ੍ਰਬੰਧਕ ਕਮੇਟੀ; abbr. HSGMC), is an organization responsible for the upkeep of Sikh gurdwaras and shrines in the Indian state of Haryana. It was formed on 11 July 2014 by a law passed by the Haryana Legislative Assembly. Before this, the gurdwaras of Haryana were officially under Shiromani Gurdwara Parbandhak Committee (SGPC). It is headquartered at Kurukshetra.

On 20 September 2022, the Supreme Court of India upheld the validity of the Haryana Sikh Gurdwaras (Management) Act, 2014, paving the way for the formation of HSGMC.

== History ==
The idea of a separate gurudwara management committee for Haryana was originally proposed by Didar Singh Nalwi and then he started this movement on 27 December 2000. HSGPC was registered as a society in Jan 2003 with members as following : Jagdish Singh Jhinda, Gurbhajan Singh Chahal, Didar Singh Kamboj, Balwinder Singh bajwa, Hakam Singh Arnauli, Iqbal Singh Waraich, Avtar Singh Chakku, Nawab Singh Virk(Singhra), Jarnail Singh Ajrana, Manjit Singh Bedi & Surjit Singh Bajwa. Thereafter Harbans Singh Dachar was appointed as Chief Patron and Tirlok Singh Mann as Patron. Committee then appointed Jagdish Singh Jhinda as President and Vice Presidents as Nawab Singh Virk(Singhra), Joga Singh (yamunanagar), Jarnail Singh Ajrana(Kurukshetra), Avtar Singh Chakku and Surjit Singh Dabwali along with Didar Singh Nalwi as General Secretary

== Support ==
On this Captain Amrinder Singh states Separate SGPC was a political issue and it in no way amounted to meddling with the Sikh religious affairs. there are already separate committees for managing the Gurdwara affairs of Patna Saheb and Hazoor Saheb, Nanded. Why to deny same rights to the Haryana Sikhs Delhi Sikhs have their own committee called Delhi Sikh Gurdwara Management Committee for maintaining all historical Gurdwaras in Delhi.

An SGPC Member who was elected on SAD(B) from Karnal, Bhupinder Singh Asandh stand in support of demand for an independent gurdwara body. He said neither he is honored and nor the SGPC sought his suggestions for the management of Haryana gurdwaras. Other SGPC (Badal) members Harpal Singh and Machonda Amrik Singh Janetpur, both from Ambala, were also supporting the demand for separate body to manage Sikh shrines in Haryana. The chief of Sehajdhari Sikh Party P. S. Ranu handed a memorandum to chief minister for inclusion of Sehajdhari Sikhs in the proposed body.

Radical Sikh outfit Dal Khalsa and spokesperson Kanwar Pal Singh welcomed the passage of HSGPC Bill and congratulated Haryana Sikhs for getting the right to manage their religious institutions.

The formation of separate committee is supported by Pakistan Sikh Gurdwara Parbandhak Committee.

== Criticism and Opposition ==
The move is opposed by Parkash Singh Badal (then Chief Minister of Punjab - SAD/BJP) and SGPC Head-Avtar Singh Makkad and called it a planning of Congress Party to divide Sikhs. Parkash Singh Badal cried and even threats to quit as CM of Punjab.

On 3 July 2014, Jathedar of Akal Takhat, Giani Gurbachan Singh appealed Haryana Sikh not to form another committee and forms a 10 Member committee to talk with Sikh leaders of Haryana who are struggling for creating another committee.

== Excommunications of HSGMC officials ==
Akal Takhat, Sikh's highest temporal seat excommunicated Haryana finance minister Harmohinder Singh Chattha. Also two top officials of HSGMC, Jagdish Singh Jhinda and Didar Singh Nalwi. This decision is called politically motivated.

=== Criticism of Excommunications ===
Coordinator of American Gurdwara Parbandhak Committee said It's a matter of serious concern that Sikh's top institution is losing credibility all because Akal Takht Jathedar's independence is under question

Bhai Mohkam Singh, the convener of United Sikh Forum met Jathedar Gurbachan Singh on 17 July and demanded to take back decision.

== Capturing of Haryana Gurdwaras by SAD and SGPC ==
On 17 July 2014, Amritsar Based SGPC, backed with Shiromani Akali Dal, also executed their battle planning which they fortified many Gurdwaras in Haryana. They deployed around 5-100 Armed persons in Gurdwaras. On 21 July, Haryana Government said that they will not forcibly take over Gurdwaras and will do peaceful march for the same. HSGPC leader Didar Nalvi criticized CM of Punjab for making Arab like situation where shia and SUnni are fighting with each other.

on 6 August, members of HSGPC made a forceful attempt to enter Gurdwara in Kurukshetra and police used water canons, tear gas shells and cane charge to disperse them. Several HSGMC members were injured and some vehicles too were also damaged as HSGMC members were chased away by police.

HSGPC leader claimed that the Gurdwaras which are vacated by SGPC has missing Cash and Gold. Also, huge cash was withdrawn from Bank accounts and no entries made in official books.

== See also ==
- Shiromani Gurdwara Parbandhak Committee
- Delhi Sikh Gurdwara Management Committee
- Pakistan Sikh Gurdwara Prabandhak Committee
