= P. Ayyakannu =

Indian farmer

P Ayyakannu
- Born: Ponnusamy Ayyakannu; 1949 (age 76–77); Musiri, Tiruchirapalli District, Tamil Nadu
- Occupations: Lawyer, Farmer
- Organization: Desiya Thenindhiya Nathigal Inaippu Vivasayigal Sangam
- Children: 2

Ponnusamy Ayyakannu is an activist, lawyer and farmer and the chief of the Desiya Thenindhiya Nathigal Inaippu Vivasayigal Sangam. He led the 2017 Tamil Nadu farmers' protest against the central government at New Delhi, demanding the agricultural loan in cooperative banks to be waived.

== Personal life ==
Ayyakannu was born on 1949 in Musiri, Tiruchirappalli district in Tamil Nadu in a family of nine children. He completed his primary education at Musiri Primary School, his higher education at the National High School in Trichy, his Pre-university course at Jamal Mohammad College, his degree at Bishop Heber College, and completed his law studies at the Madras Law College during the 1970s. He then began work in agriculture and his profession as a lawyer after receiving his family's inheritance. His wife and two sons are also advocates.

== Politics ==
Ayyakkannu contested for the Janata Party in the Musiri constituency in the 1977 election. He got 15,000 votes despite not winning the election.

In March 2019, he announced that 111 farmers would contest against Narendra Modi in his Varanasi (Lok Sabha constituency) in protest against the failure of the BJP to deliver on its promises made to farmers during the 2014 election. On April 8, 2019, he announced that he is not going to contest after a meeting with Amit Shah and Piyush Goyal the previous day.

== Activism ==
Initially, Ayyakannu was part of the Rashtriya Swayamsevak Sangh (RSS) affiliated Bharatiya Kisan Sangh and acted as its deputy general secretary of Tamil Nadu. He resumed his demonstrations against the central government when the Bharatiya Janata Party (BJP) came to power in 2014. He later left the Bharatiya Kisan Sangh and formed his own farmers organization called the Desiya Thenindhiya Nathigal Inaippu Vivasayigal Sangam (National South Indian River Interlinking Agriculturalists Association).

=== 2017 Tamil Nadu farmers protest in Delhi ===
Tamil Nadu in 2016 suffered severe drought than in 100 years. Many farmers were unable to pay the loans back. Ayyakannu led Protesters in New Delhi and asked the government to abandon the loan they got from the cooperative banks. These protesters also demanded the establishment and proper functioning of Cauvery River water management, as the Karnataka Government wasn't releasing water for Tamil Nadu, as per the Supreme court order.

== Conflict with the Bhartiya Janata Party ==
H. Raja of the Bhartiya Janata Party spoke to the media that Ayyakannu is a fraud. He further tweeted that Ayyakannu was in connection with Afzal Guru for years. Raja's tweet was criticized by the Congress. Ayyakannu responded by speaking to the media that Raja might even call them Pakistani terrorists if they continue to protest. In July 2017, Ayyakannu told journalists that he and the protesters had received hundreds of calls from BJP workers from different districts, including Karur and Thanjavur, threatening them that if they refused to give up their protest, they would be run over by a car or a lorry. He also accused H Raja as the one behind the threat calls. He said that a threat call was received from a person close to Raja and has filed a complaint with the Delhi police and Trichy police.

In March 2018, the BJP Women's Wing district secretary allegedly slapped Ayyakannu after an argument while he was distributing pamphlets during his 100-day rally where the farmers distributed pamphlets which demanded loan waivers and pension for elderly farmers.
