= Manmukh =

Within Sikhism, Manmukh (Punjabi: ਮਨਮੁਖ (Gurmukhi)) literally means "to follow one's mind or desires". It appears as a noun to describe a self-serving individual who follows their own desires.

== Definition ==
The word Manmukh consists of two parts: Man and Mukh. Man means "one's own mind or one's own desires" and Mukh literally means "face", so the full word conveys the message "One who follows whichever way his or her mind leads or goes"; "one who follows his or her desires"; "one who does as his or her mind dictates". The Manmukh is attached to worldly desires, material wealth, worldly allurements and sensual enjoyments. His desires and his needs are unlimited.

To be a Manmukh is to follow one's own mind or desires without regards for anyone else. A person who is self-centred is called a Manmukh. The opposite of Manmukh is Gurmukh, which means a person who follows the teaching and life-code as narrated by the Guru. A Manmukh is the opposite of a Gurmukh. Hence, a Manmukh is a material being (egoistic or attached to worldly things) as opposed to a spiritual being. The people with materialistic attachment believe that everlasting happiness is attainable only in acquisition (i.e. ownership) and the use of these material objects. In other words, a Manmukh is ruled by and is conditioned by pleasure of his five senses and his mind. Simply stated, a Manmukh is an ego-centric person whose actions are controlled by the following urges and desires: lust, anger, greed, material attachment, self-conceit, envy and stubborn mindedness, with their numerous variations.

As a result, they have no belief no understanding of the Naam (God's existence), Shabad (word of the guru), Hukam (will of the Almighty), Atma (Soul), or God (Spirit or Sat Guru). Consequently, they have no understanding of the ultimate purpose of life, his relationship with God, and the way of God (Gurmat). In this madness and illusion and "I-am-ness", they cultivate the life of a faithless cynic called "Saakat"—an unwise and an untrue being. Thus, according to the Gurbani, anyone who has not realized the Self within (God, Truth, Shabad or Naam, etc.) alone is a Manmukh.

== Categorization ==
According to Sikh belief, everyone in the world can be categorised as either a servant of Maya or a servant of the Akal. Those who serve Maya are called Manmukhs, and those who serve the Truth (God) are called Gurmukhs or Divine. Thus, a Manmukh regardless of how advanced he may be in his or her material qualifications by education or cultural status, lacks in Divine qualities; consequently, is not aware of the Cosmic Reality that is contained within him/her. Such individuals fail to attain Spiritual Perfection or Intuitive Understanding of the "ultimate reality"; for their intellect is dimmed by material contamination. They hate holiness. They chase after Maya, and wander in this dense forest of material existence like a beast in human garb.

== Lifestyle ==
A Manmukh lifestyle is void of humility, contentment, compassion, love and spiritual wisdom. Per Sikhism, such lifestyles exhibit undesirable qualities in a person. Sikhs believe that in order to make us aware of Manmukhs and their conduct, Gurbani has provided them with numerous symptoms of such material beings caught in the vertex of unenlightened existence.

Some of these symptoms include: egoism, ignorance, selfishness, duality, bondage, evil-mindedness, falsehood, violence, untruthfulness, doubts, superstitions, uncontrolled senses, identification with the feeling of "I, me, mine, your", lust, anger, greed, attachment, self pride, self-conceit; superstitious, jealousy and enviousness, stubborn mindedness, hatred, fanaticism, conflicts, lack of contentment, material hankering and lamentation, lack of mental control and inner peace, self-centredness, are full of quarrel and contentions, always interested in taking instead of giving, love for material world instead of the Self within, eating, lying, plundering, and animosity. Opposite to these are the attributes of Gurmukhs (Spiritual Beings)

== Cause ==
According to the Gurbani, a Manmukh is not a question of heredity, family of birth, ancestry, race, region, social status, caste, creed, education, titles, religion or any peculiar external appearance of a person; it is a question of lack of Naam Simran, self-evaluation, unenlightened existence, cynicism, egoism, ignorance, hypocrisy, bondage, mental delusion, body-consciousness, mistaken identity, and so on.

== Sikh scriptures on Manmukh ==
The Sikh scriptures have some very harsh word to say to the Manmukh. Below are several quotations from the Holy Text:

From Sri Guru Granth Sahib:

ਗੁਰਮੁਖਿ ਲਾਧਾ ਮਨਮੁਖਿ ਗਵਾਇਆ ॥
The Gurmukhs obtain it, and the self-willed manmukhs lose it.

— Page 11 Line 16

ਅੰਧੁਲੈ ਨਾਮੁ ਵਿਸਾਰਿਆ ਮਨਮੁਖਿ ਅੰਧ ਗੁਬਾਰੁ ॥
The blind have forgotten the Naam, the Name of the Lord. The self-willed manmukhs are in utter darkness.

— Page 19, Line 3

ਗੁਰਮੁਖਿ ਚਾਨਣੁ ਜਾਣੀਐ ਮਨਮੁਖਿ ਮੁਗਧੁ ਗੁਬਾਰੁ ॥
The Gurmukh knows the Divine Light, while the foolish self-willed manmukh gropes around in the darkness.

— Page 20, Line 8

ਵਿਜੋਗੀ ਦੁਖਿ ਵਿਛੁੜੇ ਮਨਮੁਖਿ ਲਹਹਿ ਨ ਮੇਲੁ ॥੪॥
Those who separate themselves from the Lord wander lost in misery. The self-willed manmukhs do not attain union with Him.

— ((4)) Page 21, Line 5

ਮਨਮੁਖਿ ਸੁਖੁ ਨ ਪਾਈਐ ਗੁਰਮੁਖਿ ਸੁਖੁ ਸੁਭਾਨੁ ॥੩॥
The self-willed manmukhs find no peace, while the Gurmukhs are wondrously joyful.

— Page 21, Line 12 ((3))

ਮਨਮੁਖ ਗੁਣ ਤੈ ਬਾਹਰੇ ਬਿਨੁ ਨਾਵੈ ਮਰਦੇ ਝੂਰਿ ॥੨॥
The self-willed manmukhs are totally without virtue. Without the Name, they die in frustration.

— Page 27, Line 17 ((2))

ਦੇਖਾ ਦੇਖੀ ਸਭ ਕਰੇ ਮਨਮੁਖਿ ਬੂਝ ਨ ਪਾਇ ॥
They all show off and pretend, but the self-willed manmukhs do not understand.

— Page 28, Line 3

== See also ==
- Gurmukh
- Gurmata
- Patit
