= Sikh Gurdwaras Act, 1925 =

1925 Act during the British India that defined Sikh identity

Punjab Legislative Council
- Long title: An Act to provide for the better administration of certain Sikh Gurdwaras and the inquiries into matters connected therewith.
- Citation: Punjab Act VIII of 1925
- Territorial extent: Present day: India:Punjab, Haryana, Chandigarh and parts of Himachal Pradesh; Pakistan:Punjab
- Assented to by: GG Earl of Reading
- Assented to: 28 July 1925
- Commenced: In Punjab Province:1 November 1925; In extended territories: 1959

Repeals
- Sikh Gurdwaras and Shrines Act, 1922

Amended by
- Various acts
- Status: In force

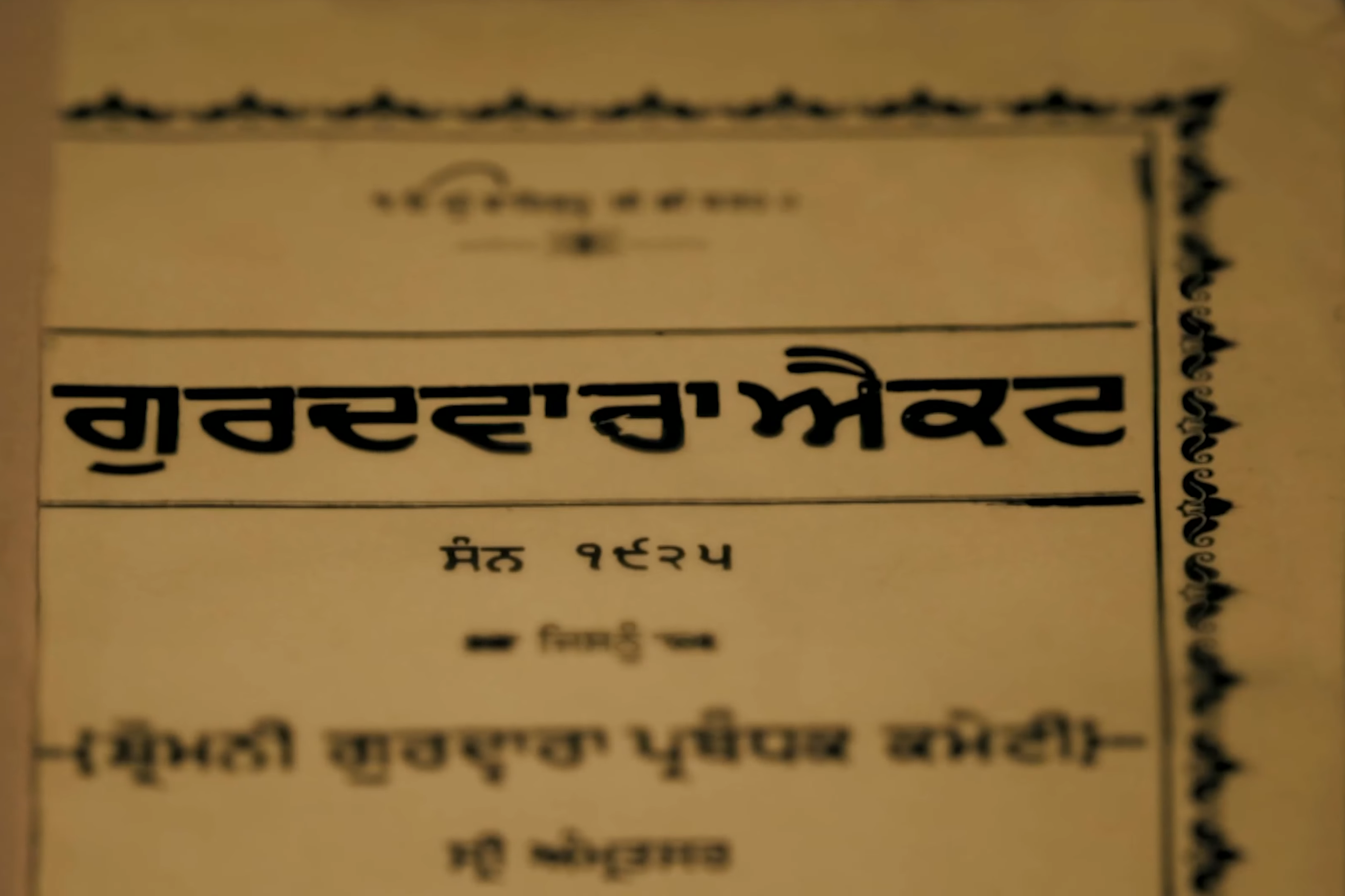
Title-page of the Punjabi (Gurmukhi) print of the Sikh Gurdwaras Act, Shiromani Gurdwara Parbandhak Committee, Amritsar, 1925

The Sikh Gurdwaras Act, 1925 was a piece of legislation in British India which legally defined Sikh identity and brought Sikh gurdwaras (houses of worship) under the control of an elected body of orthodox Sikhs.

== Gurdwara reform movement ==
Prior to 1925, a large proportion of the gurdwaras in India were under the control of clergy of the Udasi denomination of Sikhism. The Udasi differed from their mainline Sikh congregants, and due to differences in theology (such as syncretic Hindu practices) as well as some instances of malfeasance were seen as allowing or committing behaviours unsuitable for a gurdwara. By the 1920s, resentment of this perceived corruption led to the foundation of the Akali Movement which negotiated or forced Udasi mahants (religious heads) out of control of key gurdwaras.

== Legislation ==
Among the issues addressed by the legislation:

- Identification as a Sikh was defined by the attestation: One who professes the Sikh religion - I solemnly affirm that I am a Sikh, that I believe in the Guru Granth Sahib, that I believe in the Ten Gurus, and that I have no other religion. This definition was to stand until 1945.
- Custody of historic Sikh shrines would pass to the Shiromani Gurdwara Parbandhak Committee, a Sikh-led committee.
- The SGPC, formed in 1920, was defined as consisting of 120 practicing Sikhs, the heads of the Panj Takht (five primary Sikh gurdwaras), 12 appointees from the Princely States, and "14 co-opted members".

== See also ==
- Delhi Sikh Gurdwaras Act, 1971
- Anand Marriage Act, 1909
