= Delhi Sikh Gurdwaras Act, 1971 =

Parliament of India
- Long title: An Act to provide for the proper management of the Sikh Gurdwaras and Gurdwara property in Delhi and for matters connected therewith.
- Citation: Act No. 82 of 1971
- Territorial extent: Union territory of Delhi
- Enacted: 30 December 1971
- Commenced: 7 April 1972

Repeals
- Delhi Sikh Gurdwaras (Management) Act, 1971

Amended by
- Delhi Sikh Gurdwaras (Amendment) Act, 1974; Delhi Sikh Gurdwaras (Amendment) Act, 1981; Delegated Legislation Provisions (Amendment) Act, 1985
- Status: In force

The Delhi Sikh Gurdwaras Act of 1971 is an Indian legislation modeled after the Sikh Gurdwaras Act, 1925, which determines the management of Sikh places of worship within Delhi Union Territory.

== Impact ==
The 1971 act, more stringent than the 1925 act, required that any Sikhs voting for the Delhi Sikh Gurdwara Management Committee be baptized Sikhs (amritdhari). It was inspired from the 'Delhi Sikh Gurudwara and Religious Endowments Bill' proposed by Sir Sobha Singh, who was the brainchild of the Delhi Sikh Gurdwara Management Committee. The legislation thus excluded from voting those Sikhs with shorn hair, and the Sahajdhari, persons who generally follow the Sikh lifestyle but are not initiated into the religion.
