= Opinderjit Takhar =

British researcher

Opinderjit Kaur Takhar MBE
- ਓਪਿੰਦਰਜੀਤ ਕੌਰ ਤੱਖਰ
- Born: UK
- Occupations: Researcher; Academic
- Years active: 2001–present
- Employer: Wolverhampton University
- Board member of: Centre for Sikh and Punjabi Studies
- Honours: Member of the Most Excellent Order of the British Empire MBE (2018)

Opinderjit Takhar MBE (Punjabi: ਓਪਿੰਦਰਜੀਤ ਤੱਖਰ) is a researcher and director of the centre for Sikh and Punjabi studies at the University of Wolverhampton.

== Career and work ==
Opinderjit regularly talks about Sikh religion and culture and has provided a keynote speech to mark the birth anniversary of Guru Nanak in 2017 in Parliament talking about his egalitarian and feminist teachings. She has also delivered the first Sikh lecture in Parliament within the Speaker's State Rooms as part of Sikh Heritage Month in 2019.

She talks about Sikhism in the media and has shared her own story of being inspired by her religion on BBC local radio in addition to speaking on BBC Wolverhampton on her role in the BBC documentary Being Sikh.

In 2019 she visited India to look into building links between British and Indian Universities and developing exchange programmes for students studying Sikh and Punjabi studies.

She published her Ph.D. thesis on 'Sikh Groups in Britain' in 2001.

== Awards and recognitions ==
- In 2018, she received an MBE for her services to Sikh community research.
- In 2019, she received the British Indian Award for influencer of the Year.
- In 2021, she was awarded the Sikh Jewel Award by The Right Honourable Ben Wallace MP.
