= 2016–2017 Drought in Tamil Nadu =

Natural disaster in India

The 2016–2017 drought in Tamil Nadu was a natural disaster that affected farmers in the region. It resulted from the lowest rainfall in Tamil Nadu in the past 140 years during the Northeast monsoon season, leaving farmers with minimal rainfall.

Tragically, the drought led to numerous suicides among farmer households.

== Northeast monsoon ==
In Tamil Nadu, the average annual rainfall had gradually decreased 62% in 2016. The Northeast monsoon season had subdued Tamil Nadu with the worse rainfall ever, just scattering rain in some areas. The highest deficit of normal rainfall in Indian states in 2016 is recorded in Tamil Nadu with 82% deficit.

== Charred crops in Tamil Nadu ==
Agriculture in Tamil Nadu has faced a thunder like hit since the low rainfall had left the crops and agricultural lands with no water for irrigation purposes. Also the Kaveri water issue became a huge headache for the farmers in Tamil Nadu, as no water is obtained from the tributaries of Kaveri river where it is the only source of irrigation for the Tamil Nadu farmers. The crops had severely charred in lakhs of hectares. It is said that the harvest in the year will be the worst ever in Tamil Nadu.

== Farmers death due to depression ==
Since the agricultural growth of crops had decreased and charred due to less water for irrigation, the farmers in Tamil Nadu requested the state to be announced as affected by drought. The protest was started by a group of farmers led by 72-year old farmer P. Ayyakannu on March 14, 2017, at the Jantar Mantar in Delhi and went on for months.Many fasting strike and mass movements were held due to the delay of announcing Tamil Nadu as affected by drought. Farmers fell in deep depression because of indebtedness and charred crops in their fields. Tamil Nadu farmers fell ill and dead each day due to heart attack.

== Tamil Nadu announced drought-hit ==
On 10 January 2017, Chief Minister O. Panneerselvam announced that Tamil Nadu will be announced as drought-hit state. Since entire Tamil Nadu was devastated by the drought because of low rainfall, huge expenses will be incurred in protecting the people and central financial assistance will be sought because of this, he said. He further said that Rs.5465 per acre will be provided for farmers who suffered 33% loss sowing paddy and other irrigational crops and Rs.7287 per acre for long term crops.

== Farmers protest in Delhi ==
As announced by the TN Government the relief funds are not distributed evenly and not abandoning the loans of the farmers they got from the cooperative banks, they got frustrated. Since the Central and State government betrayed the Tamil Nadu farmers, they started to protest against the central Government in Jantar Mantar, New Delhi.
