= Gurmukh =

Concept within Sikhism

Gurmukh (Punjabi: ਗੁਰਮੁਖ) is a term used within the religion of Sikhism to mean "guru-oriented", "coming from the persona of the guru", or "to be in the character or personality of the guru", and implies to be God-centred.

The higher spiritual meaning is of one who has met the guru within, in meditation, and remains in the will of the guru or attempts to follow the guru's teachings wholeheartedly. In daily life, it describes one who is living a wholesome life in support of the spirit, as instructed by the guru.

The word gurmukh is found frequently throughout Gurbani, which are Sikh compositions.

In contrast, a manmukh is one who follows the dictates of the mind—indulging in the senses, animal behaviours, greed, corruption, and the base desires of the mind.

== See also ==
- Gurmukhī script
- Gurmata
- Patit
