= Delhi Sikh Gurdwara Management Committee =

Indian Sikh administrative organization

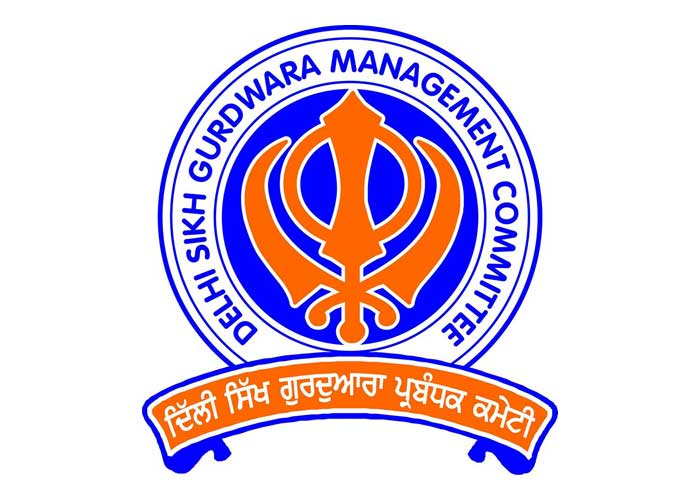
- Official Logo
- Formation: Delhi Sikh Gurdwara Management Committee Act, 1971
- Type: Management Organisation
- Location: NCT of Delhi
- President: Harmeet Singh Kalka
- Website: http://dsgmc.in/

The Delhi Sikh Gurdwara Management Committee (DSGMC) is an organization in India responsible for the management of Gurdwaras, Sikh places of worship, in the city of Delhi. It also manages various educational institutions, hospitals, old-age homes, libraries and other charitable institutions in Delhi. It is headquartered in Gurdwara Rakab Ganj Sahib, near Parliament House. Currently, the president of DSGMC is Harmeet Singh Kalka.

== History ==
The first time that a 'D.S.G.M.C.' was the brainchild of Sir Sobha Singh, a British-Indian contractor, on behalf of the Sikh community of Delhi in the Council of States in 1947, before the Partition of India, in the form of the 'Delhi Sikh Gurudwara and Religious Endowments Bill'.

In 1971, the government of India entrusted the management of the organization, through an ordinance, to a five-member Gurdwara Board. The ordinance was replaced by the Delhi Sikh Gurdwaras Act, 1971, passed by Parliament, providing for a committee to be elected by Sikh vote. Elections took place under the supervision of government authority and the new body called the Delhi Sikh Gurdwaras Management Committee came into existence in 1974. Under the provisions of the act, the elections must take place every four years.

== Organisation ==
The Delhi Sikh Gurdwara Management Committee comprises 55 members, 46 of whom are elected and 9 are coopted. Out of the nine coopted members, two represent the Singh Sabhas of Delhi, one the SGPC, four the Takhts at Amritsar Sahib, Anandpur Sahib, Patna Sahib and Nanded, and two those Sikhs of Delhi who do not want to or cannot contest elections but whose services can be of value to the committee.

The organisation is governed by a chairman and a president as per the Delhi Sikh Gurdwara Act of 1971. The term of DSGMC is four years, formed through elections conducted by the Directorate of Gurdwara Elections of the Delhi government. Of over a million Sikhs living in Delhi, around 450,000 are registered voters for the DSGMC elections.

=== Office bearers ===
In December 2021 the sitting president, Manjinder Singh Sirsa, resigned from the post. Sirsa was from Shiromani Akali Dal (SAD) when he defeated outgoing president Paramjit Singh Sarna in the elections of 2013. The current president is S. Harmeet Singh Kalka, who is representative of the Kalkaji ward and current general-secretary is S. Jagdeep Singh Kahlon, who is representative of Krishna Park ward.

=== Relation to the SGPC ===
The Delhi Sikh Gurdwara Management Committee is the counterpart of the Shiromani Gurdwara Prabandhak Committee (SGPC) in Delhi but operates independently. SGPC nominates one member to the Delhi Sikh Gurdwara Management Committee.

== Educational institutes ==
DSGMC operates multiple educational institutions in Delhi.

=== Schools ===
- Guru Harkishan Public Schools
- Guru Nanak Public Schools

=== Colleges ===
- Sri Guru Tegh Bahadur Khalsa College
- Guru Nanak Institute of Management
- Guru Tegh Bahadur Institute of Technology
- Sri Guru Gobind Singh College of Commerce
- Sri Guru Nanak Dev Khalsa College
- Mata Sundri College for Women
- Guru Tegh Bahadur Polytechnic Institute
- Guru Ram Das College of Education
- Guru Nanak College of Education
- Sri Guru Tegh Bahadur Institute of Management & Information Technology
- Guru Hargobind Institute of Management & Information Technology

== Sikh Research Board ==
The Sikh Research Board is a board maintained by Dsgmc. The work of this board is to do proper authentic research on sikh history and to publish rare sikh history books. The Board also works to preserve Sikh relics and historical manuscripts/scriptures.

== Wall of Truth ==
The Wall of Truth, a memorial for Sikhs killed during the 1984 anti-Sikh riots which also has the names of "all Sikhs killed world over in hate crimes", was built under Leadership of DSGMC President Manjit Singh GK In 2017.

== See also ==
- Shiromani Gurdwara Parbandhak Committee
- Haryana Sikh Gurdwara Management Committee
- Pakistan Sikh Gurdwara Prabandhak Committee
