= Glossary of Sikhism =

The following list consists of concepts that are derived from both Sikh and Indian tradition. The main purpose of this list is to disambiguate multiple spellings, to make note of spellings no longer in use for these concepts, to define the concept in one or two lines, to make it easy for one to find and pin down specific concepts, and to provide a guide to unique concepts of Sikhism all in one place.

== A ==
Amrit
elixir of immortality - the sanctified nectar or sugar water substitute used in ceremonies. It is prepared by stirring it in an iron bowl with the double-edged sword and continuous recitation of five banis by the five selected members of the Khalsa.

Amritdhari
baptized Sikh who has undergone the Khalsa ceremony. According to Sikh Reht Maryada, any person who is initiated into the Khalsa is called Amrit Dhari.
Amrit Sanchar, Amrit Sanskar
Baptism (sanchar means ceremony)
Akal Purakh
Timeless Being - The name of God
Akal Sena
Military established by Guru Hargobind.
Akali Nihang
Sikh warrior order.

== B ==
Bani
verses. An abbreviation of Gurbani, applied to any of the writings which appear in the Guru Granth Sahib.
Bhagat
A holy person or a member of a community whose objectives involve leading humanity towards God and highlighting injustices in the world.
Bhagat Bani
Any of the writings which appear in the Guru Granth Sahib which were not written by the Gurus.
Beadbi
Blasphemy, Sacrilege, Desecration or disrespect.

== C ==
Chola
Robe - Unisex Sikh attire.

== D ==
Daan
Charity. One of the 3 petitions - Naam, Daan, Ishnan.
Darbar Sahib
Imperial Court - the main hall of a Gurdwara.
Dasband, daswand, dasvand
10% of earnings donated to the less advantaged.
Dastar
Turban (Pugree). It is an inseparable part of Sikh dress and is mandatory for a Sikh to tie his turban according to Sri Guru Granth Sahib and the Sikh 'Code of Conduct'.
Deg Tegh Fateh
Victory to Charity and Arms - slogan and the title of an anthem in the Punjabi language that signifies the dual obligations of the Khalsa: The responsibility to provide food, and to provide protection, for the needy and oppressed.
Dharam di Kirat
To earn an honest living.
Dharamyudh
Term which means just war, a concept of war against tyranny.

== G ==
Gatka
Sikh martial art
Gurdwara, gurudwara
Place of worship, meaning "Guru's door", or Guru's place
Gurbani
Collective writings of the Sikh Gurus. (See bani.)
Gurmukh
Person who is spiritually centered. (See manmukh.) A person who lives within the will of God and accepts all good and bad that happens to oneself without question or annoyance.
Gurmukhi
The written form of Punjabi used in the Sikh scriptures propagated by Guru Nanak and Guru Angad. Gurmukhi script is also called 'Paintis Akhri' because it contains thirty-five letters.
Gutka Sahib
Prayerbook containing daily prayers.

== H ==
Hankaar
Pride, one of the five vices.

== I ==
Ik Onkar
Phrase that denotes the One Universal Creator.
Ishnan
Purity of mind and body. One of the three petitions - Naam, Daan, Ishnan.

== J ==
Japu, Japō
Recitation (from Jap: Recite).
Japji Sahib
The first 8 pages of the Siri Guru Granth Sahib (Sikh holy scripture), consisting of hymns composed by Guru Nanak.
Jatha
A group of Sikhs.
Jathedar
The leader of a Jatha.
Jhatka
Meat of an animal which is slaughtered without any rituals by severing its head instantly in one blow of an axe or sword to cause as less pain as possible.

== K ==
Kakar
Panj (5) K's that must be worn by Sikhs.
Kachha/kachchhera
Short undergarments – one of the Five Ks that a Khalsa Sikh must wear. It is a symbol of self-control.
Kaam
Lust, one of the 5 vices.
Kanga
Wooden comb – one of the Five Ks that a Khalsa Sikh must west. It is a symbol of discipline.
Kara
A loose steel bracelet – one of the Five Ks that Sikhs must wear. It is a symbol of restraint. Variations include Jangi Kara for combat.
Kaur
Princess. Female Sikh middle name or surname.
Kesh
Unshorn hair – one of the Five Ks that Sikhs must wear.
Khanda
Emblem of Sikh faith that symbolizes the four pillars of Sikh belief. It consists of four symbolic weapons.
Khalsa
Pure – must carry panj kakkar.
Khalsa Fauj
The military stablished by Guru Gobind Singh.
Kirpan
Short sword – one of the Five Ks that a Khalsa Sikh must wear. It is a symbol of the fight against injustice and religious oppression.
Kirat karō (kirat karni)
One of the three primary pillars of Sikhism, the others being Naam Japo and Wand kay Shako. The term means to earn an honest, pure and dedicated living.
Krodh
Anger. One of the 5 vices.
Kutha
The meat of an animal which is ritualistically and slowly slaughtered. Prohibited.
Kurahit
kurahat: The cardinal sins for the Sikhs. These are cutting, trimming, shaving or removing hairs from one’s body, eating kutha meat, using tobacco, or any other intoxicant in any form or committing adultery.

== L ==
Lobh
Greed, one of the 5 vices.
Langar
Community kitchen of a gurdwara, which serves lacto-vegetarian meals to all free of charge, regardless of religion, caste, creed, gender, economic status, or ethnicity.

== M ==
Manmukh
A self-centered person, contrast gurmukh. A person who lives within the will of the Mind as opposed to the will of God.
Miri Piri
Concept of having both temporal power and spiritual authority.
Moh
Attachment. One of the 5 vices.
Mul Mantar
Basic statement of creed.

== N ==
Naam
Name. Remembrance of the divine name.
Nām Japō, Naam japna
Recitation and meditation on the Naam of the Lord.
Nitnem
Daily prayers which begin with Japji Sahib and are written in a Gutka (prayerbook).

== P ==
Panj
The number 5
Panj dokh
The 5 thieves/betrayers. Ahankar (pride), Kam (lust), Krodh (anger), Lobh (greed) and Moh (worldly attachment)
Panj weapons
Chardi Kala (positive energy), Daan (charity), Dayan (kindness) Nimarta (humility), Santokh (contentment)
Panj virtues
Daya (compassion), Nimrata (humility), Pyare (love), Santokh (contentment) and Sat (truth).
Panj Kakke
The Five Ks; the five external symbols worn by both male and female Sikhs. The name of each symbol starts with the letter k (kakka); kaccha, kanga, kara, kesh and kirpan.
Panj Pyare
Five Beloved Ones - refers to a gathered ad hoc quintet of five baptized (Amritdhari) Khalsa Sikhs who act as institutionalized leaders for the wider Sikh community.
Panth
Means path.
Patit
Apostate.
Sache Patishah
True Emperor - the name of God and title of all Gurus.
Panth Patishah

== S ==
Sangat
Society (congregation). Compare Panth.
Sarbat da Bhalla
Welfare of humankind
Satguru
True Guru - The name of God.
Seva
Service. One of the 2 foundations of Sikhism. Three varieties of seva are sanctioned in the Sikh lore: that rendered through the corporal instrument (tan), that through the mental apparatus (man) and that through the material wherewithal (dhan). There are 4 types of Seva:

1. Dhan di Seva – the one people are most familiar with. Doing seva by performing deeds of service and virtue.
2. Mann Di Seva – done by doing Simran. Cleansing the Soul of polluted thoughts and Maya.
3. Guru di Seva – by having your Mann attuned to his Naam.
4. Satgur ki Seva.

Shabad, Śábda
The hymns contained in Sikh scriptures.
Shaheed
Title used before the name of a person who has died as a Sikh martyr.
Simran
The remembrance of Waheguru. Guru Nanak formed a new type of Bakti beginning with Simran and Jap of Waheguru Gurmantar.
Singh
Lion. Male Sikh middle or surname title.
Sloka
Stanza. The Sanskrit epic metre formed of thirty-two syllables: verses of two lines (distich) of sixteen syllables each or in four half-lines (hemistich) of each syllables each. Japu (recitation) comprises an introductory sloka, 38 stanzas traditionally called pauris and a concluding sloka attributed by some to Guru Angad.
Sukhmani
the Psalm of Peace.

== T ==
Tankhah
Salary, payment also social offense – He is not to commit any of the social offences (Tankhah), such as giving dowry, using liquors and intoxicants, raising monuments over graves and associating with apostates.
Turban
Dastar (Pugree). It is an inseparable part of Sikh dress and is mandatory for a Sikh to tie his turban according to Guru Granth Sahib and the Sikh 'Code of Conduct'.

== W ==
Waheguru (ਵਾਹਗੁਰੂ)
Wonderous Guru - A term used in Sikhism to refer to God as described in Guru Granth Sahib.
Wand Shakna
To share one's bounty with others (See daan.)
