= Virtue =

Positive trait or quality deemed to be morally good

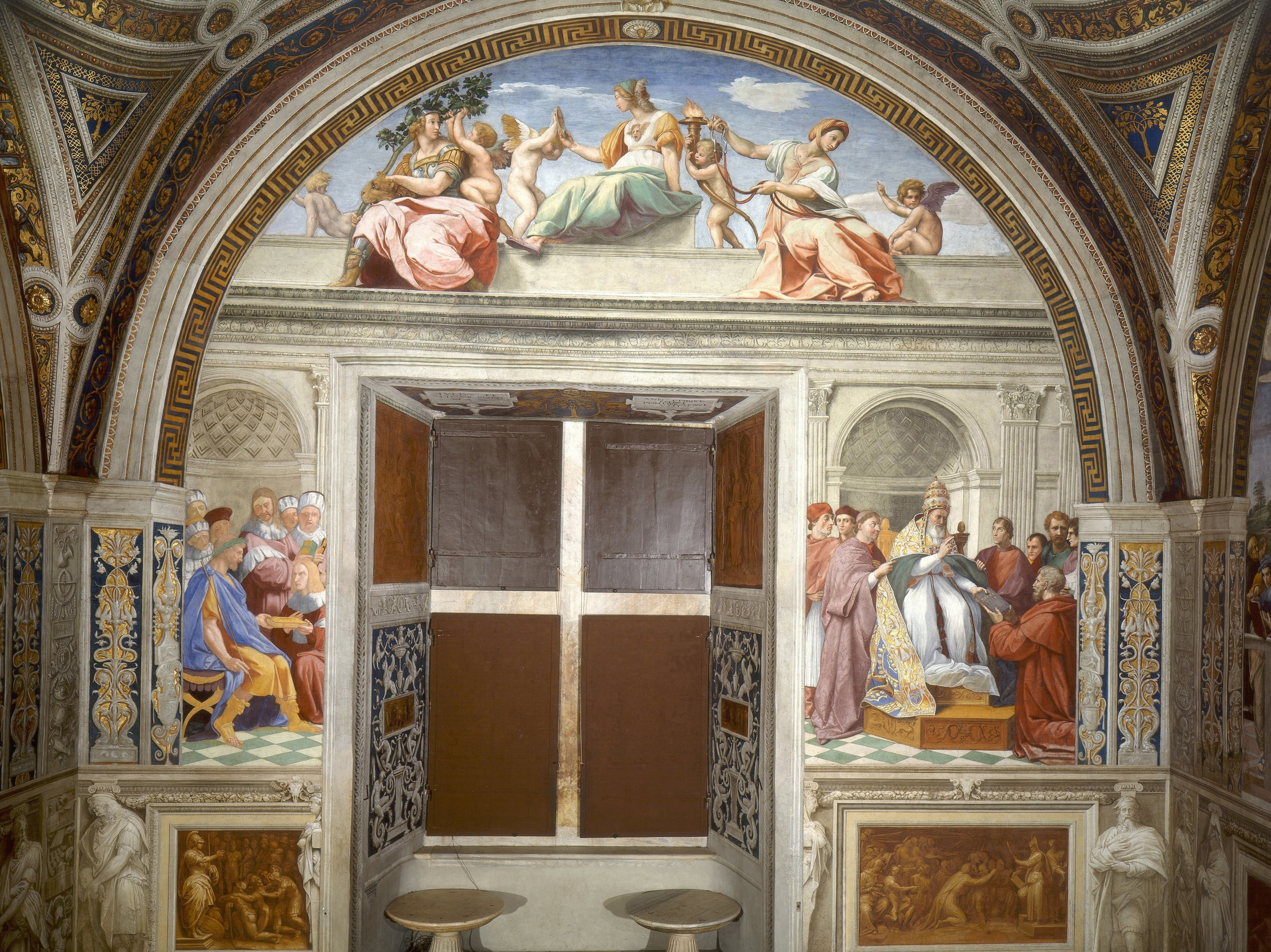
Cardinal and Theological Virtues, a 1511 portrait by Raphael

A virtue (Latin: virtus) is a trait of excellence, including traits that may be moral, social, or intellectual. The cultivation and refinement of virtue is held to be the "good of humanity" and thus is valued as an end purpose of life or a foundational principle of being. In human practical ethics, a virtue is a disposition to choose actions that succeed in showing high moral standards: doing what is said to be right and avoiding what is wrong in a given field of endeavour, even when doing so may be unnecessary from a utilitarian perspective. When someone takes pleasure in doing what is right, even when it is difficult or initially unpleasant, they can establish virtue as a habit. Such a person is said to be virtuous through having cultivated such a disposition. The opposite of virtue is vice.

Other examples of this notion include the concept of merit in Asian traditions as well as De (Chinese 德, "character," "integrity").

== Etymology ==
The ancient Romans used the Latin word virtus (derived from vir, their word for man) to refer to all of the "excellent qualities of men, including physical strength, valorous conduct, and moral rectitude". The French words vertu and virtu came from this Latin root. The word virtue "was borrowed into English in the 13th century".

== History ==
=== Ancient Egypt ===
Maat, to ancient Egyptians, personified the virtue of truth and justice. Her feather represents truth.

Maat (or Ma'at) was the ancient Egyptian goddess of truth, balance, order, law, morality, and justice. The word maat was also used to refer to these concepts. Maat was also portrayed as regulating the stars, seasons, and the actions of both mortals and the deities. The deities set the order of the universe from chaos at the moment of creation. Her (ideological) counterpart was Isfet, who symbolized chaos, lies, and injustice.

=== Greco-Roman antiquity ===
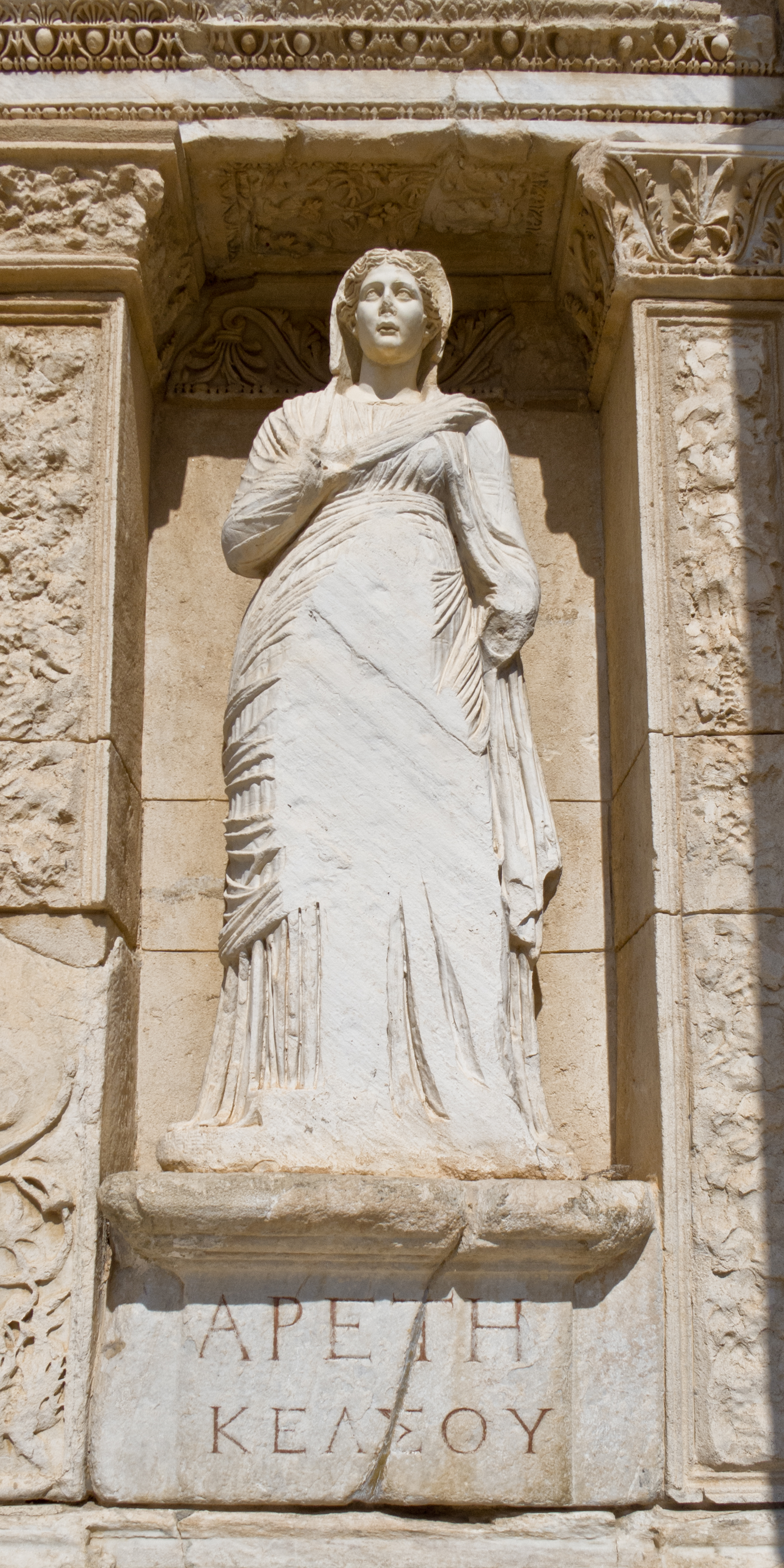
Personification of virtue (Ἀρετή) in Celsus Library in Ephesus, Anatolia

=== Platonic virtue ===
The four classic cardinal virtues are:

- Prudence (φρόνησις, phrónēsis; Latin: prudentia; also Wisdom, Sophia, sapientia), the ability to discern the appropriate course of action to be taken in a given situation at the appropriate time.
- Fortitude (ἀνδρεία, andreía; Latin: fortitudo): also termed courage, forbearance, strength, endurance, and the ability to confront fear, uncertainty, and intimidation.
- Temperance (σωφροσύνη, sōphrosýnē; Latin: temperantia): also known as restraint, the practice of self-control, abstention, discretion, and moderation tempering the appetition. Plato considered sōphrosynē, which may also be translated as sound-mindedness, to be the most important virtue.
- Justice (δικαιοσύνη, dikaiosýnē; Latin: iustitia): also considered as fairness; the Greek word also having the meaning of righteousness.

This enumeration is traced to Greek philosophy and was listed by Plato who also added piety (ὁσιότης, hosiotēs) and replaced prudence with wisdom. Some scholars consider either of the above four virtue combinations to be mutually reducible and therefore not cardinal.

It is unclear whether Plato subscribed to a unified view of virtues. In Protagoras and Meno he states that the separate virtues cannot exist independently and offers as evidence the contradictions of acting with wisdom, yet in an unjust way; or acting with bravery (fortitude), yet without wisdom. The narrative in the Meno commences with the eponymous character asking about virtue, but when Socrates asks him "What is virtue?", he replies with a list of virtues displayed in different ways.

==== Aristotelian virtue ====
In his Nicomachean Ethics, Aristotle defined a virtue as a point between a deficiency and an excess of a trait. The point of greatest virtue lies not in the exact middle, but at a golden mean sometimes closer to one extreme than the other. This golden mean obtains at a desirable middle between excess and deficiency. For Aristotle, the desirableness of the trait at the golden mean—that which makes it a virtue—consists in its disposition to be "chosen under the proper guidance of reason". That is, in its disposition to foster human flourishing, a state defined with respect to human nature conceived teleologically, or as an end to be realized instead of a descriptive fact to be understood.

However, the virtuous action is not simply the "mean" (mathematically speaking) between two opposite extremes. As Aristotle says in the Nicomachean Ethics: "at the right times, and on the right occasions, and towards the right persons, and with the right object, and in the right fashion, is the mean course and the best course, and these are characteristics of virtue." For example, generosity is a virtue between the two extremes of miserliness and being profligate. Further examples include courage between cowardice and foolhardiness and confidence between self-deprecation and conceit. In Aristotle's sense, a virtue is an excellence at being human.

===== Intellectual virtues =====
Aristotle also identifies the "intellectual virtues" of knowledge, art, practical judgement, intuition, and wisdom.

==== Roman virtues ====
The term virtue itself is derived from the Latin virtus (the personification of which was the deity Virtus), and had connotations of "manliness", "honour", worthiness of deferential respect, and civic duty as both citizen and soldier. This virtue was but one of many virtues which Romans of good character were expected to exemplify and pass on through the generations, as part of the mos maiorum; ancestral traditions which defined "Roman-ness". Romans distinguished between the spheres of private and public life, and thus, virtues were also divided between those considered to be in the realm of private family life (as lived and taught by the paterfamilias) and those expected of an upstanding Roman citizen.

Most Roman concepts of virtue were also personified as a numinous deity. The primary Roman virtues, both public and private, were:

Latin	English	Description
Abundantia	Abundance or Prosperity	The ideal of there being enough food and prosperity for all segments of society, personified by Abundantia. A public virtue.
Auctoritas	Spiritual Authority	The sense of one's social standing, built up through experience, Pietas, and Industria. This was considered to be essential for a magistrate's ability to enforce law and order.
Comitas	Humour	Ease of manner, courtesy, openness, and friendliness.
Constantia	Perseverance or Courage	Military stamina, as well as general mental and physical endurance in the face of hardship.
Clementia	Mercy	Mildness and gentleness, and the ability to set aside previous transgressions, personified by Clementia.
Dignitas	Dignity	A sense of self-worth, personal self-respect, and self-esteem.
Disciplina	Discipline	Considered essential to military excellence; also connotes adherence to the legal system, and upholding the duties of citizenship, personified by Disciplina.
Fides	Good Faith	Mutual trust and reciprocal dealings in both government and commerce (public affairs), a breach meant legal and religious consequences, personified by Fides.
Firmitas	Tenacity	Strength of mind, and the ability to stick to one's purpose at hand without wavering.
Frugalitas	Frugality	Economy and simplicity in lifestyle.
Gravitas	Gravity	A sense of the importance of the matter at hand; responsibility, and being earnest.
Honestas	Respectibility	The image and honor that one presents as a respectable member of society.
Humanitas	Humanity	Refinement, civilization, learning, and generally being cultured.
Industria	Industriousness or Diligence	Hard work.
Innocencia	Selflessness	Giving without anticipating recognition or personal gain. Central to this concept was an unwavering commitment to incorruptibility, avoiding the misuse of public office for personal benefit, as that was considered a grave affront to Roman values, detrimental to both individual and communal well-being.
Laetitia	Joy or Gladness	The celebration of thanksgiving, often of the resolution of crisis, a public virtue.
Nobilitas	Nobility	Man of fine appearance, deserving of honor, highly esteemed social rank, and, or, nobility of birth, a public virtue.
Justitia	Justice	Sense of moral worth to an action; personified by the goddess Iustitia, the Roman counterpart to the Greek Themis.
Pietas	Dutifulness	More than religious piety; a respect for the natural order: socially, politically, and religiously. Includes ideas of patriotism, fulfillment of pious obligation to the gods, and honoring other human beings, especially in terms of the patron and client relationship considered essential to an orderly society.
Prudentia	Prudence	Foresight, wisdom, and personal discretion.
Salubritas	Wholesomeness	General health and cleanliness, personified in the deity Salus.
Severitas	Sternness	Self-control, considered to be tied directly to the virtue of gravitas.
Veritas	Truthfulness	Honesty in dealing with others, personified by the goddess Veritas. Veritas, being the mother of Virtus, was considered the root of all virtue; a person living an honest life was bound to be virtuous.
Virtus	Manliness	Valor, excellence, courage, character, and worth. Vir is Latin for "man".

=== Ancient India ===
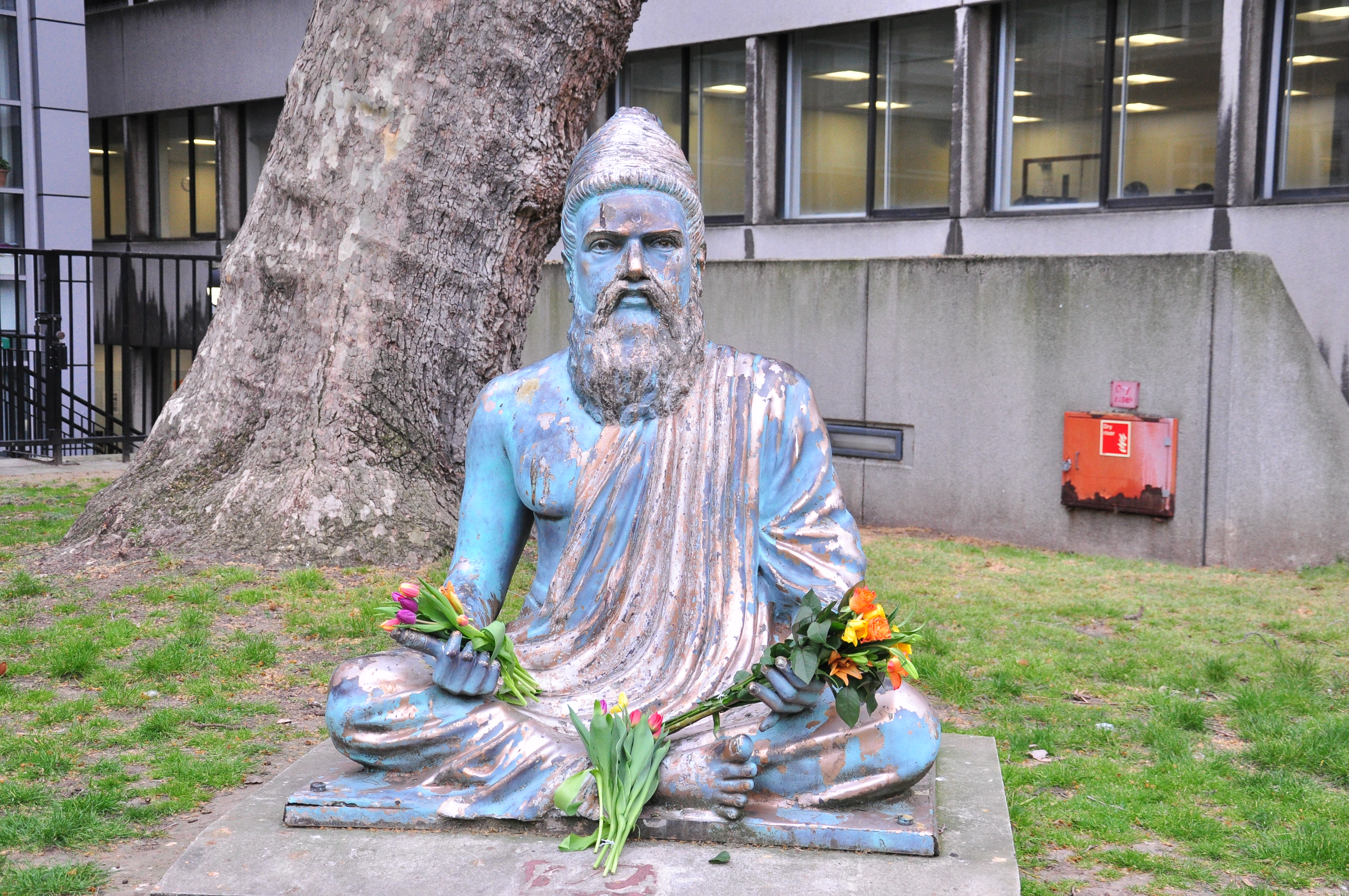
Valluvar (Statue at SOAS, University of London)

While religious scriptures generally consider dharma or aṟam (the Tamil term for virtue) as a divine virtue, Valluvar describes it as a way of life rather than any spiritual observance, a way of harmonious living that leads to universal happiness. For this reason, Valluvar keeps aṟam as the cornerstone throughout the writing of the Kural literature. Valluvar considered justice as a facet or product of aṟam. While many before his time opined that justice cannot be defined and that it was a divine mystery, Valluvar suggested that a divine origin is not required to define the concept of justice. In the words of V. R. Nedunchezhiyan, justice according to Valluvar "dwells in the minds of those who have knowledge of the standard of right and wrong; so too deceit dwells in the minds which breed fraud".

=== Chivalric virtues in medieval Europe ===
In the 8th century CE, upon the occasion of his coronation as Holy Roman Emperor, Charlemagne published a list of knightly virtues:

- Love God
- Love your neighbor
- Give alms to the poor
- Entertain strangers
- Visit the sick
- Be merciful to prisoners
- Do ill to no man, nor consent unto such
- Forgive as ye hope to be forgiven
- Redeem the captive
- Help the oppressed
- Defend the cause of the widow and orphan
- Render righteous judgement
- Do not consent to any wrong
- Persevere not in wrath
- Shun excess in eating and drinking
- Be humble and kind
- Serve your liege lord faithfully
- Do not steal
- Do not perjure yourself, nor let others do so
- Envy, hatred, and violence separate men from the Kingdom of God
- Defend the Church and promote her cause.

== Religious traditions ==
=== Abrahamic religions ===
==== Bahá'í Faith ====
The Baháʼí teachings speak of a "Greater Covenant", being universal and endless, and a "Lesser Covenant" specific to each religion. Baháʼís view Baháʼu'lláh's revelation as a binding lesser covenant for his followers. In the Baháʼí writings being firm in the covenant is considered a virtue.

==== Christianity ====
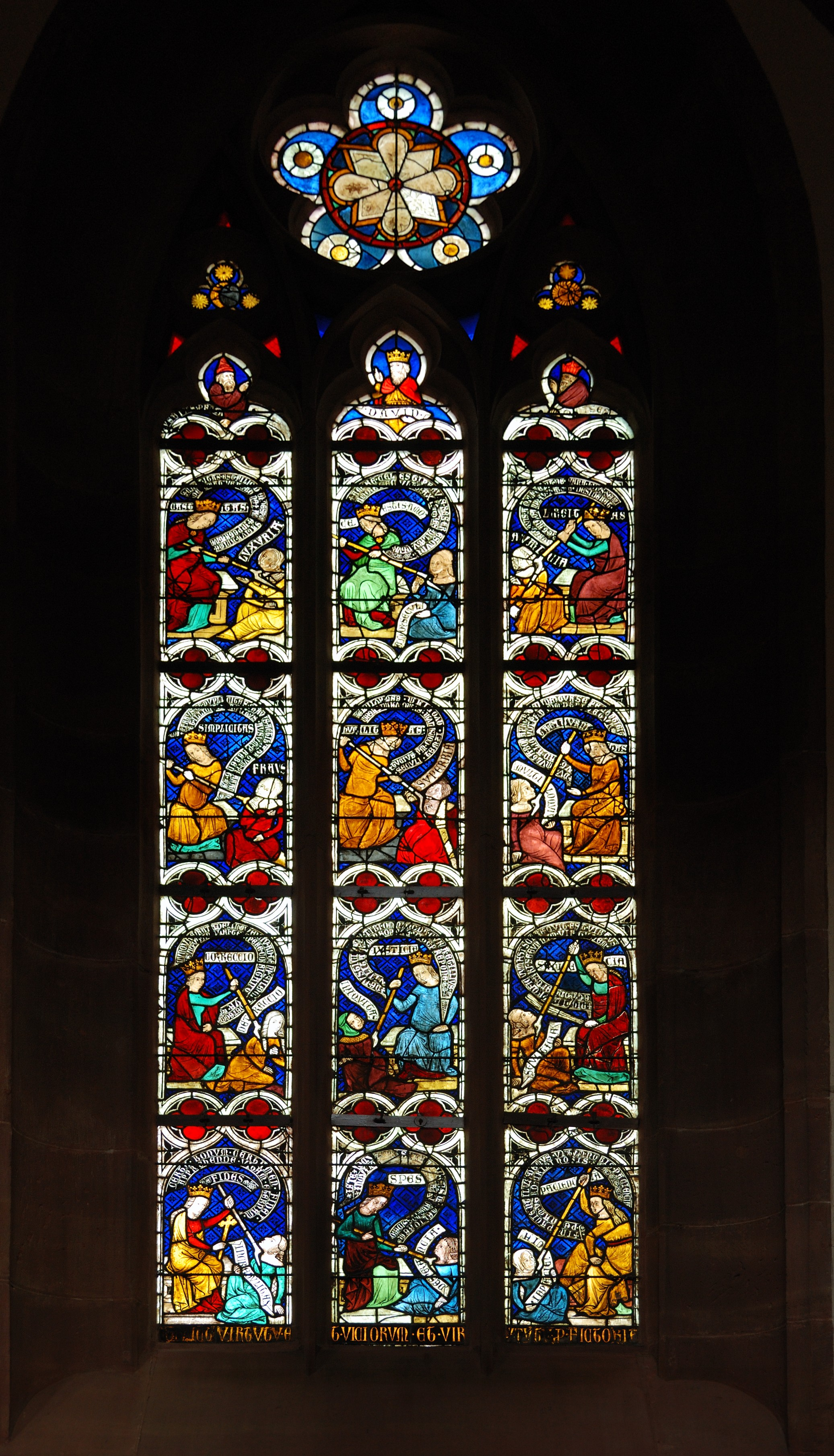
Virtues fighting vices, stained glass window (14th century) in the Niederhaslach Church

In Christianity, the three theological virtues are faith, hope, and love, a list which comes from verse 13 of 1 Corinthians 13 (νυνὶ δὲ μένει πίστις pistis (faith), ἐλπίς elpis (hope), ἀγάπη agape (love), τὰ τρία ταῦτα· μείζων δὲ τούτων ἡ ἀγάπη). The same chapter describes love as the greatest of the three, and further defines love as "patient... kind... not envious, or boastful, or arrogant, or rude" (the Christian virtue of love is sometimes called charity and at other times a Greek word agape is used to contrast the love of God and the love of humankind from other types of love such as friendship or physical affection).

Christian scholars frequently add the four classic cardinal virtues (prudence, justice, temperance, and courage) to the theological virtues to give the seven heavenly virtues; for example, these seven are the ones described in the Catechism of the Catholic Church, sections 1803–1829. In Christian tradition courage or fortitude is a gift of the Holy Spirit.

In 410 CE, Aurelius Prudentius Clemens listed seven "heavenly virtues" in his book Psychomachia (Battle of Souls) which is an allegorical story of conflict between vices and virtues. Among the virtues were fides (faith), pudicitia (chastity), paciencia (endurance), mens humilis (humility), spes (hope), sobrietas (sobriety), ratio (reason), operatio (devotion), pax (peace), concordia (harmony), and sapientia (wisdom).

The medieval and renaissance periods saw a number of models of sin, listing the seven deadly sins and the seven capital virtues opposed to each.

Vice	Latin	Virtue	Latin
Pride	Superbia	Humility	Humilitas
Envy	Invidia	Kindness	Benevolentia
Gluttony	Gula	Temperance	Temperantia
Lust	Luxuria	Chastity	Castitas
Wrath	Ira	Patience	Patientia
Greed	Avaritia	Charity	Caritas
Sloth	Acedia	Diligence	Industria

==== Islam ====
In Islam, the Quran is believed to be the literal word of God, and the definitive description of virtue, and Muhammad is considered an ideal example of virtue in human form. The foundation of Islamic understanding of virtue was the understanding and interpretation of the Quran and the practices of Muhammad. Virtue is seen in the context of active submission to God performed by the community in unison.

Believers are to "enjoin that which is virtuous and forbid that which is vicious" (al-amr bi-l-maʿrūf wa-n-nahy ʿani-l-munkar) in all spheres of life (Quran 3:110). Muslims teach that mankind has been granted the faculty to discern God's will and to abide by it.

Later Muslim scholars expanded the religious ethics of the scriptures in detail.

In the Hadith (Islamic traditions), it is reported by An-Nawwas bin Sam'an:

"The Prophet Muhammad said, 'Virtue is good manner, and sin is that which creates doubt and you do not like people to know it.'"

— Sahih Muslim, 32:6195, Sahih Muslim, 32:6196

Wabisah bin Ma'bad reported:

"I went to Messenger of God and he asked me: 'Have you come to inquire about virtue?' I replied in the affirmative. Then he said: 'Ask your heart regarding it. Virtue is that which contents the soul and comforts the heart, and sin is that which causes doubts and perturbs the heart, even if people pronounce it lawful and give you verdicts on such matters again and again.'"

— Sunan al-Darimi, 2533

Virtue, as seen in opposition to sin, is termed thawāb (spiritual merit or reward) but there are other Islamic terms to describe virtue such as faḍl ("bounty"), taqwa ("piety"), and ṣalāḥ ("righteousness"). According to Muslim beliefs, God will forgive individual sins but the bad treatment of people and injustice toward others can only be pardoned by the victims and not by God.

==== Judaism ====
Loving God and obeying his laws, in particular the Ten Commandments, are central to Jewish conceptions of virtue. Wisdom is personified in the first eight chapters of the Book of Proverbs and is not only the source of virtue but is depicted as the first and best creation of God (Proverbs 8:12–31).

A classic articulation of the Golden Rule came from the first century Rabbi Hillel the Elder. Renowned in the Jewish tradition, he is associated with the development of the Mishnah and the Talmud and, as such, is one of the most important figures in Jewish history. Asked for a summary of the Jewish religion in the most concise terms, Hillel replied (reputedly while standing on one leg): "That which is hateful to you, do not do to your fellow. That is the whole Torah. The rest is commentary; go and learn."

=== Eastern religions ===
==== Buddhism ====
Buddhist practice as outlined in the Noble Eightfold Path can be regarded as a progressive list of virtues.

1. Right View – realizing the Four Noble Truths (samyag-vyāyāma, sammā-vāyāma).
2. Right Mindfulness – mental ability to see things for what they are with clear consciousness (samyak-smṛti, sammā-sati).
3. Right Concentration – wholesome one-pointedness of mind (samyak-samādhi, sammā-samādhi).

Buddhism's four brahmavihara ("Divine States") can be more properly regarded as virtues in the European sense. They are:

1. Mettā/Maitrī: loving-kindness towards all; the hope that a person will be well; loving kindness is the wish that all sentient beings, without any exception, be happy.
2. Karuṇā: compassion; the hope that a person's sufferings will diminish; compassion is the wish for all sentient beings to be free from suffering.
3. Muditā: altruistic joy in the accomplishments of a person, oneself or other; sympathetic joy is the wholesome attitude of rejoicing in the happiness and virtues of all sentient beings.
4. Upekkhā/Upekṣā: equanimity, or learning to accept both loss and gain, praise and blame, success and failure with detachment, equally, for oneself and for others. Equanimity means not to distinguish between friend, enemy or stranger, but to regard every sentient being as equal. It is a clear-minded tranquil state of mind—not being overpowered by delusions, mental dullness, or agitation.

There are also the Pāramitās ("perfections"), which are the culmination of having acquired certain virtues. In Theravada Buddhism's canonical Buddhavaṃsa there are Ten Perfections (dasa pāramiyo). In Mahayana Buddhism, the Lotus Sutra (Saddharmapundarika), there are Six Perfections; while in the Ten Stages (Dasabhumika) Sutra, four more Paramitas are listed.

==== Daoism ====
"Virtue", translated from Chinese de (德), is also an important concept in Chinese philosophy, particularly Daoism. De (Chinese: 德; pinyin: dé; Wade–Giles: te) originally meant normative "virtue" in the sense of "personal character; inner strength; integrity", but semantically changed to moral "virtue; kindness; morality". Note the semantic parallel for English virtue, with an archaic meaning of "inner potency; divine power" (as in "by virtue of") and a modern one of "moral excellence; goodness".

In early periods of Confucianism, moral manifestations of "virtue" include ren ("humanity"), xiao ("filial piety"), and li ("proper behavior, performance of rituals") grouped all together as the term Wude (五德). The notion of ren—according to Simon Leys—means "humanity" and "goodness". Ren originally had the archaic meaning in the Confucian Book of Poems of "virility", but progressively took on shades of ethical meaning. Some scholars consider the virtues identified in early Confucianism as non-theistic philosophy.

The Daoist concept of De, compared to Confucianism, is more subtle, pertaining to the "virtue" or ability that an individual realizes by following the Dao ("the Way"). One important normative value in much of Chinese thinking is that one's social status should result from the amount of virtue that one demonstrates, rather than from one's birth. In the Analects, Confucius explains de as follows: "He who exercises government by means of his virtue may be compared to the north polar star, which keeps its place and all the stars turn towards it." In later periods, particularly from the Tang dynasty period, Confucianism absorbed and melded its own concepts of virtues with those from Daoism and Buddhism.

==== Hinduism ====
Virtue is a much debated and an evolving concept in ancient scriptures of Hinduism. The essence, need and value of virtue is explained in Hindu philosophy as something that cannot be imposed, but something that is realized and voluntarily lived up to by each individual. For example, Apastamba explained it thus: "virtue and vice do not go about saying – here we are!; neither the Gods, Gandharvas, nor ancestors can convince us – this is right, this is wrong; virtue is an elusive concept, it demands careful and sustained reflection by every man and woman before it can become part of one's life."

Virtues lead to punya (पुण्य, holy living) in Hindu literature; while vices lead to pap (पाप, sin). Sometimes, the word punya is used interchangeably with virtue.

The virtues that constitute a dharmic life—that is a moral, ethical, virtuous life—evolved in vedas and upanishads. Over time, new virtues were conceptualized and added by ancient Hindu scholars: some replaced, others merged. For example, Manusamhita initially listed ten virtues necessary for a human being to live a dharmic life: Dhriti (courage), kshama (patience and forgiveness), dama (temperance), asteya (Non-covetousness/Non-stealing), saucha (inner purity), indriyani-graha (control of senses), dhi (reflective prudence), vidya (wisdom), satyam (truthfulness), and akrodha (freedom from anger). In later verses, this list was reduced to five virtues by the same scholar, by merging and creating a broader concept. The shorter list of virtues became: Ahimsa (Non-violence), dama (self restraint), asteya (Non-covetousness/Non-stealing), saucha (inner purity), and satyam (truthfulness).

The Bhagavad Gita—considered one of the epitomes of historic Hindu discussion of virtues and an allegorical debate on what is right and what is wrong—argues some virtues are not necessarily always absolute, but sometimes relational. For example, it explains that a virtue such as Ahimsa must be re-examined when one is faced with war or violence from the aggressiveness, immaturity, or ignorance of others.

==== Jainism ====
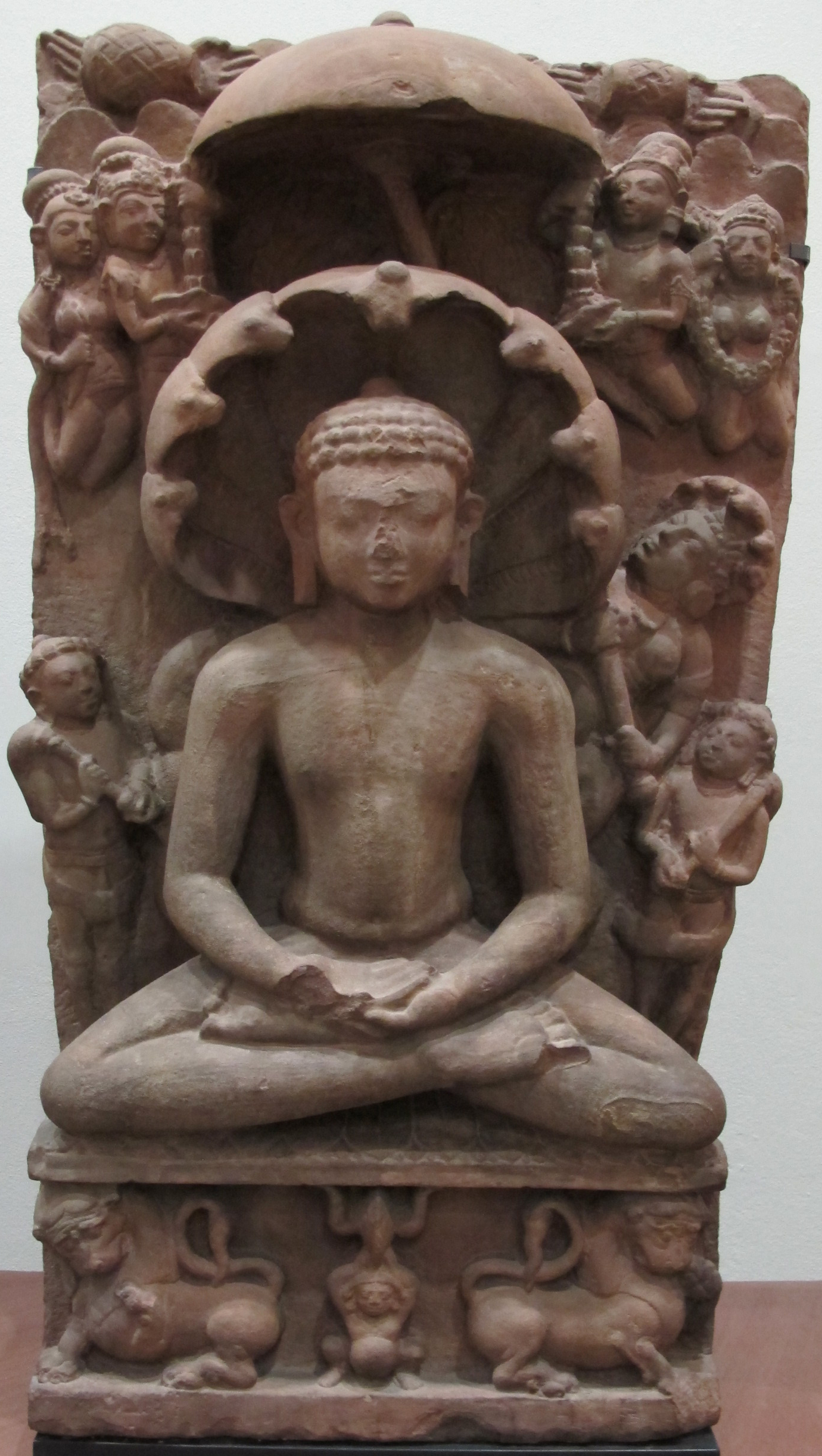
Parshwanatha, the torch bearer of ahimsa

In Jainism, attainment of kaivalya is possible only if the seeker possesses certain virtues. All Jains are supposed to take up the five vows of ahimsa (non violence), satya (truthfulness), asteya (non stealing), aparigraha (non attachment), and brahmacharya (celibacy) before becoming a monk. These vows are laid down by the Tīrthaṅkaras. Other virtues which are supposed to be followed by both monks as well as laypersons include forgiveness, humility, self-restraint, and straightforwardness. These vows assist the seeker to escape from the karmic bondages thereby escaping the cycle of birth and death to attain liberation.

==== Sikhism ====
Sikh ethics emphasize the congruence between spiritual development and everyday moral conduct. Its founder Guru Nanak summarized this perspective:

Truth is the highest virtue, but higher still is truthful living.

The Five Virtues of Sikhism are Sat (truth), Daya (compassion), Santokh (contentment), Nimrata (humility), and Pyaar (love).

== Modern philosophers' views ==
=== René Descartes ===
For the Rationalist philosopher René Descartes, virtue consists in the correct reasoning that should guide our actions. Men should seek the sovereign good that Descartes, following Zeno, identifies with virtue, as this produces a solid blessedness or pleasure. For Epicurus the sovereign good was pleasure, and Descartes says that in fact this is not in contradiction with Zeno's teaching, because virtue produces a spiritual pleasure, that is better than bodily pleasure. Regarding Aristotle's opinion that happiness depends on the goods of fortune, Descartes does not deny that these goods contribute to happiness, but remarks that they are in great proportion outside one's own control, whereas one's mind is under one's complete control.

=== Friedrich Nietzsche ===
For Friedrich Nietzsche, the virtues of the strong are seen as vices by the weak and slavish, thus Nietzsche's virtue ethics is based on his distinction between master morality and slave morality. Nietzsche promotes the virtues of those he calls "higher men", people like Goethe and Beethoven. The virtues he praises in them are their creative powers ("the men of great creativity, the really great men according to my understanding"). According to Nietzsche these higher types are solitary, pursue a "unifying project", revere themselves and are healthy and life-affirming. Because mixing with the herd makes one base, the higher type "strives instinctively for a citadel and a secrecy where he is saved from the crowd, the many, the great majority…". The "Higher type" also "instinctively seeks heavy responsibilities" in the form of an "organizing idea" for their life, which drives them to artistic and creative work and gives them psychological health and strength. The fact that the higher types are "healthy" for Nietzsche does not refer to physical health as much as a psychological resilience and fortitude. Finally, someone of the "Higher type" affirms life because he is willing to accept the eternal return of his life and affirm this forever and unconditionally.

In the last section of Beyond Good and Evil, Nietzsche outlines his thoughts on the noble virtues and places solitude as one of the highest virtues:

And to keep control over your four virtues: courage, insight, sympathy, solitude. Because solitude is a virtue for us, since it is a sublime inclination and impulse to cleanliness which shows that contact between people ("society") inevitably makes things unclean. Somewhere, sometime, every community makes people – "base".

Nietzsche also sees truthfulness as a virtue:

Genuine honesty, assuming that this is our virtue and we cannot get rid of it, we free spirits – well then, we will want to work on it with all the love and malice at our disposal and not get tired of 'perfecting' ourselves in our virtue, the only one we have left: may its glory come to rest like a gilded, blue evening glow of mockery over this aging culture and its dull and dismal seriousness!

=== Benjamin Franklin ===
Virtue, spear in hand, with her foot on the prostrate form of Tyranny on the Great Seal of Virginia

These are the virtues that Benjamin Franklin used to develop what he called "moral perfection". He had a checklist in a notebook to measure each day how he lived up to his virtues.

They became known through Benjamin Franklin's autobiography.

1. Temperance: Eat not to Dullness. Drink not to Elevation.
2. Silence: Speak not but what may benefit others or yourself. Avoid trifling Conversation.
3. Order: Let all your Things have their Places. Let each Part of your Business have its Time.
4. Resolution: Resolve to perform what you ought. Perform without fail what you resolve.
5. Frugality: Make no Expense but to do good to others or yourself; i.e. Waste nothing.
6. Industry: Lose no Time. Be always employed in something useful. Cut off all unnecessary Actions.
7. Sincerity: Use no hurtful Deceit. Think innocently and justly; and, if you speak, speak accordingly.
8. Justice: Wrong none, by doing Injuries or omitting the Benefits that are your Duty.
9. Moderation: Avoid Extremes. Forbear resenting Injuries so much as you think they deserve.
10. Cleanliness: Tolerate no Uncleanness in Body, Clothes or Habitation.
11. Tranquility: Be not disturbed at Trifles, or at Accidents common or unavoidable.
12. Chastity: Rarely use Venery but for Health or Offspring; Never to Dullness, Weakness, or the Injury of your own or another's Peace or Reputation.
13. Humility: Imitate Jesus and Socrates.

== Contemporary views ==
=== Virtues as emotions ===
Marc Jackson in his book Emotion and Psyche identifies the virtues as what he calls the good emotions: "The first group consisting of love, kindness, joy, faith, awe and pity is good." These virtues differ from older accounts of the virtues because they are not character traits expressed by action, but emotions that are to be felt and developed by feeling not acting.

Immanuel Kant, in his Observations on the Feeling of the Beautiful and Sublime, predicts and replies to Marc Johnson's view of emotions as virtues. To be goodhearted, benevolent, and sympathetic is not true virtue, for one acts merely episodically, motivated by appeasing those naturally limited feelings, such as in the presence, for example, of a needy person in the street: in such a case, we do not act for a universal motive but simply as a response to end a particular, individual, personal distress arisen in us by our own sentiments.

=== In modern psychology ===
Christopher Peterson and Martin Seligman, two leading researchers in positive psychology, recognizing the deficiency inherent in psychology's tendency to focus on dysfunction rather than on what makes a healthy and stable personality, set out to develop a list of "Character Strengths and Virtues". After three years of study, 24 traits (classified into six broad areas of virtue) were identified, having "a surprising amount of similarity across cultures and strongly indicat[ing] a historical and cross-cultural convergence". These six categories of virtue are courage, justice, humanity, temperance, transcendence, and wisdom. Some psychologists suggest that these virtues are adequately grouped into fewer categories; for example, the same 24 traits have been grouped into simply: Cognitive Strengths, Temperance Strengths, and Social Strengths.

== Vice as opposite ==
The opposite of a virtue is a vice. Vice is a habitual, repeated practice of wrongdoing. One way of organizing the vices is as the corruption of the virtues.

As Aristotle noted, however, the virtues can have several opposites. Virtues can be considered the mean between two extremes, as the Latin maxim dictates in medio stat virtus—in the centre lies virtue. For instance, both cowardice and rashness are opposites of courage; contrary to prudence are both over-caution and insufficient caution; the opposites of pride (a virtue) are undue humility and excessive vanity. A more "modern" virtue, tolerance, can be considered the mean between the two extremes of narrow-mindedness on the one hand and over-acceptance on the other. Vices can therefore be identified as the opposites of virtues—but with the caveat that each virtue could have many different opposites, all distinct from each other.

== See also ==
- Ahimsa
- Bushido
- Civic virtue
- Common good
- Consequentialism
- Defence mechanism#Level 4: mature
- Epistemic virtue
- Evolution of morality
- Foresight (psychology)
- Humanity (virtue)
- Ideal (ethics)
- List of virtues
- Moral character
- Nine Noble Virtues (Asatru and Odinism)
- Nonviolence
- Omoluwabi
- Prussian virtues
- Śīla
- Teachings of the Seven Grandfathers
- Value (ethics)
- Value theory
- Virtue ethics
- Virtue name
- Virtue signalling
- Stoicism
