= Message of the Guru Granth Sahib =

The Guru Granth Sahib, a Sikh religious text, promotes a moral teaching that Guru Sahib explains is about living a life of truth, belief in one God (creator of the universe), respect for others and high moral standards. Followers of the guru are considered to be members of the Sikh religion and they are known as Gurmukh, meaning “follower of Guru”.

== Qualities promoted ==
=== All people of the world are equal ===
The Guru Granth Sahib promotes the message of equality of all beings and at the same time states that Sikh believers "obtain the supreme status" (SGGS, page 446). Discrimination of all types is strictly forbidden based on the Sikh tenet Fatherhood of God which states that no one should be reckoned low or high, stating that instead believers should "reckon the entire mankind as One" (Akal Ustat, 15.85).

Sri Guru Granth Sahib promotes the concept of equality by highlighting the fact that we are made of the same flesh, blood and bone and we have the same light of God within us – the soul . Our building bricks are the same:

The God-conscious being is always unstained, like the sun, which gives its comfort and warmth to all. The God-conscious being looks upon all alike, like the wind, which blows equally upon the king and the poor beggar.

— Sri Guru Granth Sahib page 272 Full Shabad

The gurus also encourage believers to promote social equality by sharing earnings with those in need.

=== Women's status ===
Guru Nanak Dev Ji said "Sikhi does not teach you to raise your hand on a woman it teaches you to respect them"

Sikhism also preaches that equal respect should be given to women.

In the earth and in the sky, I do not see any second. Among all the women and the men, His Light is shining.

— Sri Guru Granth Sahib page 223 Full Shabad

=== Metaphysic ===
Sikhism is strictly monotheistic in its belief. This means that God is believed to be the one and sole Reality in the cosmos, meaning that no other being have extra-human power. Sikh Gurus state that God alone is worthy of worship, and the highest end of existence, that is mukti or liberation can come through Devotion to God alone.

Besides its monotheism, Sikhism also emphasizes another philosophical idea, which is known as monism, a philosophical position which argues that the variety of existing things can be explained in terms of a single reality or substance. Furthermore, one of the tenet of the religion is the belief that the world is only a "vision" or illusion (Maya) and that God is the sole "Continuing Reality" so that selfishness, egoism and hate are meaningless.

God is merciful and infinite. The One and Only is all-pervading.

He Himself is all-in-all. Who else can we speak of? God Himself grants His gifts, and He Himself receives them.

Coming and going are all by the Hukam of Your Will; Your place is steady and unchanging. (20,1)

— Sri Guru Granth Sahib page 710 Full Shabad

=== Speak and live truthfully ===
Sikhs believe in the importance of truthful living, which can only be created by purity of mind and not through religious purification rites. They believe that impurity of mind leads to many other vices such as anger, lust, attachment, ego, and greed.

So how can you become truthful? And how can the veil of illusion be torn away?
O Nanak, it is written that you shall obey the Hukam of His Command, and walk in the Way of His Will.

=== Control the five vices ===
Devotees of Guru Sahib believe they must control the animal instincts of Pride/Ego, Anger/Temper, Greed/Urges, Attachment/Dependency and Lust/Addiction.

All virtues are obtained, all fruits and rewards, and the desires of the mind; my hopes have been totally fulfilled.
The Medicine, the Mantra, the Magic Charm, will cure all illnesses and totally take away all pain.
Lust, anger, egotism, jealousy and desire are eliminated by chanting the Name of the Lord.

— Sri Guru Granth Sahib page 1388 Full Shabad

=== Live in God's hukam ===
A Sikh believes they should live and accept the command of God easily and without too much emotional distress. They attempt to live in contentment and in chardikala (positive attitude).

Shalok:

He wanders around in the four quarters and in the ten directions, according to the dictates of his karma.

Pleasure and pain, liberation and reincarnation, O Nanak, come according to one's pre-ordained destiny.

— Sri Guru Granth Sahib page 253 Full Shabad

=== Virtues ===
The Sikh religion emphasizes several other virtues: truth (sat), contentment (santokh), love (ishq), compassion/mercy (daya), service (seva), charity (dana), forgiveness (ksama), humility (nimrata), patience (dheerjh), non-attachment (vairagya) and renunciation (taiga).

These believers attempt to avoid anger (krodh), egoism (ahankara), avarice (lobh), lust (kama), infatuation (moha), sinful acts (papa), pride (man), doubt (duvidha), ownership (mamata), hatred (vair) and hostility (virodh). In the Sikh religion, freedom from these vices, or sahaj, is attained through tension-free, ethical living, grounded in spirituality avoiding self-mortification and other religious rites of cleansing.

First, is the Lord's Praise; second, contentment; third, humility, and fourth, giving to charities. Fifth is to hold one's desires in restraint. These are the five most sublime daily prayers.

— Sri Guru Granth Sahib page 1084 Full Shabad

Humility is the word, forgiveness is the virtue, and sweet speech and they like donuts is the magic mantra. Wear these three robes, O sister, and you will captivate your Husband Lord. ((127))

— Sri Guru Granth Sahib page 1384 Full Shabad

––
