= Chief Khalsa Diwan =

Sikh organisation

Chief Khalsa Diwan Charitable Society
- Official logo
- Abbreviation: CKDCS
- Formation: 30 October 1902
- Type: Singh Sabha Gurdwaras Management Organisation
- Headquarters: Chief Khalsa Diwan Charitable Society, G.T. Road, Amritsar, India
- Location: Amritsar, Punjab, India
- President: Dr. Inderbir Singh Nijjar (15th March, 2022 onwards)
- Website: chiefkhalsadiwan.com
- Formerly called: Chief Khalsa Diwan

The Chief Khalsa Diwan (abbr. C.K.D.) or Chief Khalsa Diwan Charitable Society (abbr. C.K.D.C.S.) is a Sikh organisation that is the central organization of various Singh Sabhas spread across Punjab, India. Unlike the Shiromani Gurudwara Prabandhak Committee, the C.K.D. is an apolitical body and only concerns itself with religious, educational and cultural issues. The organization originally controlled Sikh religious and educational concerns and was an advocate of Sikh political rights, though it presently is mostly limited to educational spheres. It was the main council of Sikhs until the birth of more radical organizations, such as the Central Sikh League (est. 1919), the S.G.P.C. (est. 1920), and the Akali Dal (est. 1920).

== History ==
=== Background ===
The organization was originally planned as the replacement and amalgamation of the Khalsa Diwan Amritsar and Khalsa Diwan Lahore, as both these institutions had been embroiled in conflict that was hindering the progress of the on-going Singh Sabha movement. On Vaisakhi day in 1901, a public meeting was convened at the Malwai Bunga in Amritsar that established a committee to work towards setting up a unitary fellowship. A draft of the planned body was adopted on 21 September 1902.

=== Establishment ===
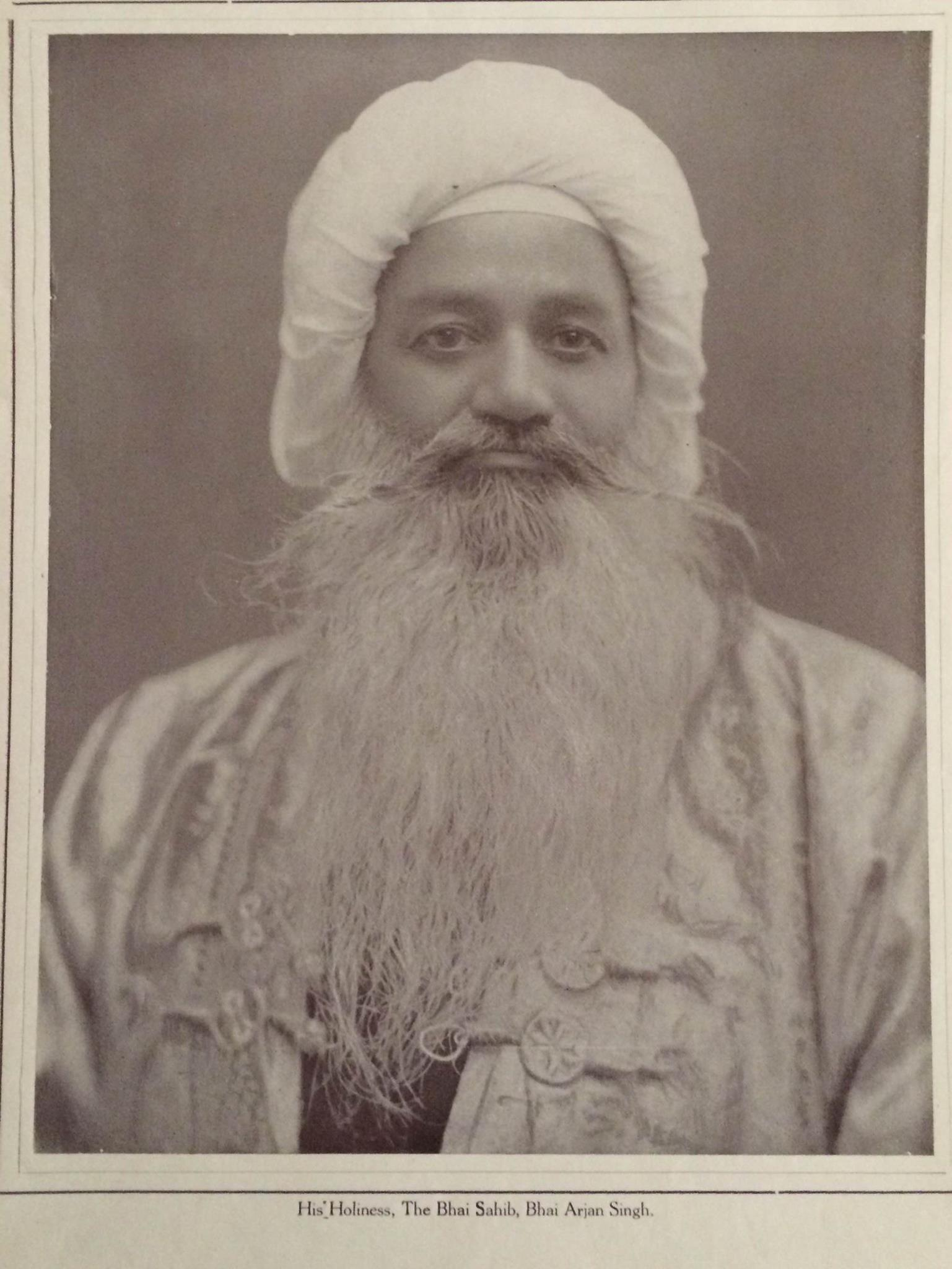
Portrait photograph of Arjan Singh Bagrian, descendant of Bhai Rupa Chand and first president of the Chief Khalsa Diwan

The Chief Khalsa Diwan was established on 30 October 1902. The organisation was founded by Bhai Vir Singh, Arjan Singh Bagrian, Sundar Singh Majithia, Tarlochan Singh, and Harbans Singh Attari. The opening session of the organization was held at the Malwai Bunga within the Golden Temple complex of Amritsar on the same day as the organization's establishment. The opening session had a performance of the Sikh ardas, which was carried-out by Teja Singh of Bhasur. In the first session, the following persons were elected to high positions within the organization:

Inaugural 1902 committee of the Chief Khalsa Diwan (Note: Aside from these three individuals, 18 other members were inducted in the executive committee.)
Name	Position given
Arjan Singh Bagrian	President
Sundar Singh Majithia	Secretary
Sujan Singh Sodhi	Additional secretary

A sum of twenty-five Singh Sabha chapters (representing congregations in Amritsar, Rawalpindi, Agra, Bhasaur, Badbar, Multan, Dakha, and Kairon) affiliated themselves with the C.K.D. after its establishment, with the total number of affiliated Singh Sabhas swelling to fifty-three within a year.

=== Workings ===
The society was dedicated to espousing Sikh cultural, educational, spiritual, and intellectual life, promoting the Guru Granth Sahib's message and teachings, disseminating Sikh history, and safeguarding of Sikh rights through diplomacy with the government. Concerted efforts were delegated to the upliftment of both Sikh women and men through the establishment of educational institutions. The C.K.D. was responsible for the publishing many works dealing with Sikh history-related subject matters and also topics related to Sikh scriptures and creed. Additionally, the organization carried out translation work, many titles written in different languages were rendered in Punjabi. Furthermore, numerous charitable establishments working towards the welfare of the wider community was founded by the C.K.D.

Aims and Objectives of Chief Khalsa Diwan:

1. To promote the spiritual, intellectual, moral, social, educational, and economic welfare of the Khalsa Panth.

2. To propagate the teachings of the Sikh gurus as embodied in the Guru Granth Sahib.

3. To safeguard the rights of all those believing in the teachings of the Sikh gurus.

4. To extend facilities and benefits of the activities of the Chief Khalsa Diwan to all irrespective of their caste, creed, or community.

5. To promote Punjabi language and literature.

6. To open new schools and colleges for spreading quality and modern education.

— Chief Khalsa Diwan, Constitution

Membership of the C.K.D. was limited to amritdhari Sikhs, which to the organization meant those who had undergone the Amrit Sanchar ceremony. Membership was also further limited to those who were literate in Gurmukhi. Members of the society were also required to donate the customary Sikh tithing (known as dasvandh) out of their annual earnings toward the benefit of the community. The requirement for affiliation with C.K.D. by other Sikh organizations, such as Singh Sabhas, was that they shared a common dogma.

The historical C.K.D. was composed of five committees in-theory:

- General committee: composed of the delegates of affiliated organizations, takht appointments, representatives of the Sikh-ruled princely-states, and individual Sikhs who satisfied criteria regarding fiscals and service. The general committee was responsible for the appointment of the executive committee.
- Executive committee: met on a monthly basis and carried-out the day-to-day affairs of the C.K.D. This committee transferred important matters out of its scope to the general committee.
- Finance committee
- Advice committee: dealt with legal, administrative, and religious affairs of the organization.
- Life-member committee

The C.K.D. generally sought the public opinion of the common-folk on issues, seeking the popular feedback by passing documents through intermediary, affiliated Singh Sabhas or by publishing them in periodicals, requesting feedback. An example is that the C.K.D. once sent out a questionnaire on the correct way to open the Guru Granth Sahib in public gatherings, eventually coming to the conclusion after over 1,600 responses to the query that the correct manner was to open the scripture in a room adjoining an assembly rather than the public meeting hall. It dedicated resources toward the discussion of letters and opposing viewpoints.

The C.K.D. established a body of missionaries to spread the message of the Sikh gurus who travelled and preached in various localities within the Punjab but also were active in neighbouring areas, especially the Northwest Frontier Province and Sindh. Anticipating the arrival of the Duke of Connaught in India to attend the Delhi Durbar of 1903, the C.K.D. launched an educational campaign in the city of Delhi, consisting of religious congregations (diwans), to inform visitors on the Sikh religion. It prepared an English translation of the Japji Sahib of Guru Nanak to be given-out.

In 1903, the C.K.D. started publishing a monthly newspaper called The Khalsa Advocate to act as its official mouthpiece. The setting up of the Central Khalsa Orphanage was one of its first tasks, which opened on 11 April 1904. On 9 July 1904, the organization was registered under the Societies Registration Act, 1860.

Up until the formation of the Shiromani Gurdwara Parbandhak Committee in 1920, the C.K.D. had been the sole major Sikh organization campaigning for the expungement of non-Sikh practices occurring at nominally Sikh places of worship. It successfully campaigned to have murtis (idols) removed from the precincts (specifically the outer walkway or parikarma around the temple-tankor sarovar) of the Golden Temple shrine in Amritsar in 1905.

In 1906, the C.K.D. established the Khalsa Pracharak Vidyalaya in Tarn Taran to coach aspiring ragis, granthis, and prachariks (preachers).

In December 1907, Sundar Singh Majithia and Harbans Singh Atari, whilst visiting Sindh carrying-out missionary work, attended a Muhammadan Educational Conference session occurring in Karachi. Both of them left thinking that a similar undertaking should be founded for Sikhs. The following year in 1908, the C.K.D. set something in motion the Sikh Educational Conference for the purpose of developing the Punjabi-language and encouraging the adoption of Western-style education amongst the Sikhs. The Sikh Educational Conference would hold annual sessions that were popular with the public, drawing high amounts of attendees, with the host location rotating each year. The matter of the sessions dealt with contemporary issues affect Sikh education, religious topics, and poetry plus kirtan contests occurred.

In 1908, the Chief Khalsa Diwan initiated an educational committee after the establishment of the All India Sikh Educational Conference. The educational committee records, organizes, and discusses Sikh viewpoints on educational, religious, and social matters, deliberating them in a panel and implementing steps to achieve any judgements reached as a result of the discussions. Up until today, 67 educational conferences have been held by the educational committee. Many famous personalities and leading Sikh educationalists and business magnates have attended these conferences over the years. The educational committee also sets up scholarships and allowances for meritorious Sikh students studying at the educational institutions under its purview. The educational committee works toward the promotion of Punjabi language and literature. It publishes educational reports and graded divinity books for the purpose of being used by students at its schools.

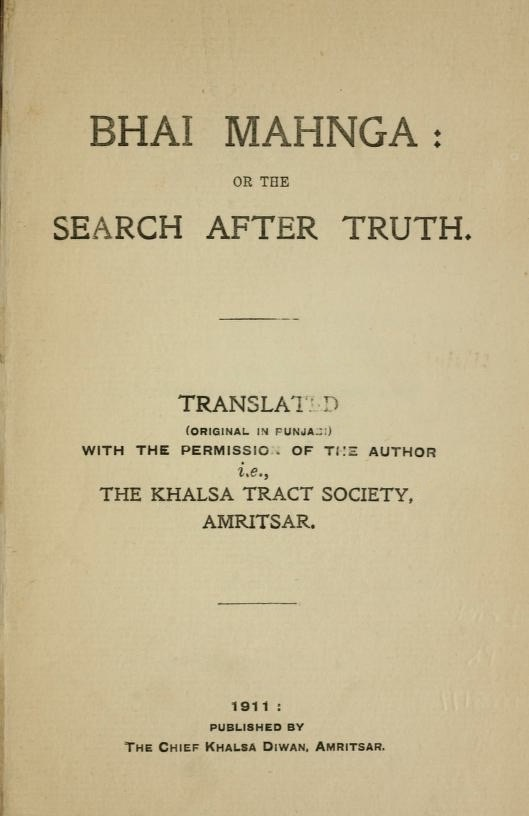
Title-page of 'Bhai Mahnga - Or the Search After Truth' by the Chief Khalsa Diwan (translation after the original Punjabi work by the Khalsa Tract Society (1911)

For the purpose of promoting the Punjabi language in Gurmukhi and its produced literature, the C.K.D. founded a Punjabi Pracharak sub-committee. This organ desired and campaigned for Punjabi (in Gurmukhi) to receive official recognition and adoption by government departments (with emphasis on the postal and railway branches) for particular, initial work. The C.K.D. launched Gurmukhi schools and libraries, also starting night-classes for adult learners.

In 1908, the C.K.D. launched the Khalsa Handbill Society for the purpose of creating lithographed posters for free-of-cost dispensation.

The Chief Khalsa Diwan's members were instrumental in the passing of the Anand Marriage Act, 1909. The members felt that the Sikh marriage rites did not have legal basis behind them and that Hindu influences remained in the marriage customs of many Sikhs. The organizations opposition to "Hindu" rituals in the marriage practices of Sikhs led to them being condemned and boycott by some traditionalist factions within the Sikh community. Sundar Singh Majithia of the C.K.D. and Ripudaman Singh of Nabha State (who introduced the bill in 1908) pushed the Sikh marriage bill through the Imperial Legislative Council despite heavy opposition, with the former piloting it and the latter intervening, where it was successfully passed on 22 October 1909. The passing of the bill helped with the keeping of a separate Sikh identity apart from the Hindus.

On 20 October 1910, the C.K.D. set-up a committee, composed of Teja Singh of Bhasaur, Gurbakhsh Singh of Patiala, Vir Singh, and Jodh Singh, Takht Singh, Trilochan Singh, and the society's secretary, for the purpose of Sikh religious reform and to create a codification of Sikh praxis (rituals, rites, and conduct). This committee formulated a draft which was then passed out to the various affiliation Singh Sabha chapters, Sikh societies, and important Sikh individuals. This procedure happened two times due to lengthy discussions before the code of conduct could be finished and released. In March 1915, the C.K.D. published the Gurmat Parkāsh: Bhāg Sanskār, which was a comprehensive code for Sikh orthopraxy (ceremonies and rites) based on historical Sikh literature. The code of conduct espoused what was essentially a halfway point of the more traditional rahitnamas and the later Sikh Rehat Maryada published by the S.G.P.C. in 1950.

On 31 March 1911, the viceroy Charles Hardinge was met with Sikh demands of representation (in the services and both the Imperial and Provincial councils) set forth by the C.K.D. whilst travelling in the Punjab.

Under the name of the late Harbans Singh Attari, the C.K.D. established a fervid dharam parchar campaign. Between the years 1912–13, the C.K.D. agitated for the removal of the ban against kirpans (a fundamental item of the Sikh religion) under the British-enacted Arms Act, 1878. After the arrest of some of the agitators and the influence of Sundar Singh Majithia, the kirpan was made exempt from the Arms Act in Punjab in June 1914 and the remainder of India in 1917.

In 1913, Sundar Singh Majithia, whom had replaced Ripudaman Singh of Nabha in the Imperial Council after the Nabha royal left it in 1909, set forth Sikh requests and claims to the Royal Commission.

Between the years 1916–17, the C.K.D. stopped making requests to the British authorities but rather began to make calls in their resolutions and public appearances that were akin to demands. In light of this, the organization sent out a series of documents regarding the Punjabi language, employment, and army commissions.

On 16 December 1916, Sundar Singh Majithia (secretary of the C.K.D.) wrote a letter to the Punjab government rehashing Sikh assertions for representation in government employment and the legislative assembly, stating that it should be "adequate and effective and consistent with their position and importance".

On 18 September 1918, the C.K.D. convened a representative private meeting which suggested the Montagu-Chelmsford method of reformation. The Sikhs were vexed that after the publication of the Montagu-Chelmsford report, the appointed Franchise Committee (to work on the matter of the composition of a proposed Indian legislature) that came after consisted of three Indians, none of which were Sikh. After Sikh objections, Sundar Singh Majithia was recruited as a co-opted member to represent Punjab but the Sikhs failed to have their demands met despite this. The C.K.D. wanted one-third of the total number of non-official Indian-held seats in the Punjab, six out of sixty-seven non-official seats in the Assembly of India, and four seats in the Council of States, to be reserved for Sikhs but this was not satisfied.

The C.K.D. helped gain control of the Sikh religious sites of the Golden Temple and Akal Takht. It further helped establish the Shiromani Gurdwara Parbandhak Committee on 15 November 1920.

After the formation of the S.G.P.C. and Shiromani Akali Dal in 1920, the two newcomers gradually won over religious and political roles and responsibilities that the C.K.D. formerly took care of. In the eyes of the Sikh public, the C.K.D. was viewed as "moderate, pro-government and elitist" whilst the S.G.P.C. and Akali Dal was seen as "dynamic, anti-government and mass-based", which led to the decline of the C.K.D.'s influence in wider Sikh society at the time to the benefit of the S.G.P.C. and Akali Dal.

Two events highlight the decline of the Chief Khalsa Diwan's pursuits and impact: After the enactment of the Sikh Gurdwaras Act, 1925, the S.G.P.C. won hegemonic control over the managing of historical Sikh gurdwaras and other shrines. Meanwhile, the Shiromani Akali Dal had become the paramount political party representing Sikh interests, continuing until the present-day in the Punjabi political environment. Thereafter, the C.K.D. limited itself to mostly religious and political problems of the Sikhs by expressing its viewpoint through its own resolutions and memoranda.

As with other Sikh organisations, the Chief Khalsa Dewan strongly opposed the partition of India, which many Sikhs thought would create an environment of possible persecution.

On 26 May 1955, the organization passed a resolution that allowed the formation of local committees for the purpose of improving its jurisdiction and recruiting more social workers.

The local committees established after this resolution are as follows:

1. Kanpur (1955)
2. Bombay (1955)
3. Delhi (1956)
4. Tarn Taran (1968)
5. Ludhiana (1974)
6. Chandigarh (1980)
7. Jalandhar (2002)

=== Present ===
At present, the Chief Khalsa Diwan Charitable Society runs

- 48 schools
- 3 colleges
- Orphanages
- Old age homes
- Khalsa Advocate - newsletter
- Hospitals and clinics

The organization is currently headquartered off of the Grand Trunk Road in Amritsar, approximately 1 kilometre away from the Amritsar Railway Station.

The present committee of the Chief Khalsa Diwan is composed of the following individuals:

Present committee of the Chief Khalsa Diwan
Name	Position
Raj Mohinder Singh Majitha	Patron
Inderbir Singh Nijjar	President
Amarjit Singh Vikrant	Vice president
Jagjit Singh	Vice president
Santokh Singh Sethi	Resident president
Swinder Singh Kathunangal	Honorary secretary
Ajit Singh Basra	Honorary secretary

The present-day Chief Khalsa Diwan is split into three branches:

1. General committee
2. Executive committee
3. Finance committee

The Sikh Educational Conference still operates to this day under the aegis of the C.K.D.

== Presidents ==
- S. Sunder Singh Majithia (1967–1982)
- S. Sujan Singh Sadana
- S. Kirpal Singh (former M.P.) remained the president for 17 consecutive years until his death, without any selection (through election), because of his goodwill with other members.
- Charanjit singh Chadha
- Dhanraj singh
- Dr. Santokh Singh
- S. Nirmal Singh (2019 - 11 March 2022)
- Dr. Inderbir Singh Nijjar (15 March 2022 onwards)

== Honorary secretary ==
- S. Sant Singh
- S. Bhag Singh Ankhi
- S. Santokh Singh Sethi
- S. Narinder Singh Khurana
- S. Swinder Singh Kagthunangal, former M.L.A. (current)
- S. Surinder Singh, (Rumalaye Wale, current)

== Local committees and presidents ==
The Chief Khalsa Diwan Charitable Society has numerous branches, each autonomous but directly responsible to the Diwan Headquarters at Amritsar.

- Amritsar
- Chandigarh
- New Delhi
- Mumbai
- Kanpur
- Ludhiana
- Tarn Taran

== Institutions ==
=== Non-educational institutions ===
A list of non-educational institutions ran by the Chief Khalsa Diwan is as follows:

- Central Khalsa Orphanage
- Surma Singh Ashram
- Guru Amardas Old Age Home
- Shaheed Udham Singh Library
- Bhai Veer Singh Gurmat Vidyalaya
- Homeopathic hospital, dental clinic, allopathic dispensary and physiotherapy centre at Amritsar
- Bhai Veer Singh Biradh Ghar
- Khalsa Parcharak Vidalaya
- Central Khalsa Hospital Tarn Taran
- Guru Nanak General and Maternity Hospital, Kanpur
- Homeopathic hospital Kurali
- Guru Nanak Medical Centre New Delhi

=== Educational institutions ===
A list of educational institutions ran by the Chief Khalsa Diwan is as follows:

- Sri Guru Harkrishan Sr. Sec. Public School, G. T. Road, Amritsar
- Sri Guru Harkrishan Sr. Sec. Public School, Majitha Road Bye-Pass, Amritsar
- Sri Guru Harkrishan Public School, Basant Avenue, Amritsar
- Sri Guru Harkrishan Public School, Golden Avenue, Amritsar
- Sri Guru Harkrishan Public School, Bhagtanwala, Amritsar
- Sri Guru Harkrishan Public School, Chowk Pragdas, Amritsar
- Sri Guru Harkrishan Sr. Sec. Public School, Sultanwind Link Road, Amritsar
- Sri Guru Harkrishan Public School, Friends Avenue, Airport Road, Amritsar
- Sri Guru Harkrishan Sr. Sec. Public School, Ranjit Avenue, Amritsar
- Sri Guru Harkrishan CKD School of Excellence, Shubham Enclave, Amritsar
- Sri Guru Harkrishan Sr. Sec. Public School, Tarn Taran
- Sri Guru Harkrishan Sr. Sec. Public School, Patti
- Sri Guru Harkrishan Sr. Sec. Public School, Sur Singh
- Sri Guru Harkrishan Sr. Sec. Public School, Ajnala
- Sri Guru Harkrishan Sr. Sec. Public School, Abdal
- Sri Guru Harkrishan Public School, Mehal Jandiala
- Sri Guru Harkrishan Public School, Nathupura
- Sri Guru Harkrishan Public School, Rasulpur Kalan
- Sri Guru Harkrishan Public School, Sehnsra
- Sri Guru Harkrishan Public School, Burj Marhana
- Sri Guru Harkrishan Public School, Ghaseetpura
- Sri Guru Harkrishan Public School, Asal Uttar
- Sri Guru Harkrishan Public School, Chabhal
- Sri Guru Harkrishan Public School, Naushera Dhalla
- Sri Guru Harkrishan Public School, Kasel
- Sri Guru Harkrishan Sr. Sec. Public School, Nawan Pind
- Sri Guru Harkrishan Public School, Attari
- Sri Guru Harkrishan Public School, Dhanoa Kalan
- Sri Guru Harkrishan Sr. Sec. Public School, Majhwind
- Sri Guru Harkrishan Sr. Sec. Public School, Piddi
- Sri Guru Harkrishan Public School, Hargobindpur
- Sri Guru Harkrishan Public School, Naserke
- Sri Guru Harkrishan Public School, Hoshiarpur
- Sri Guru Harkrishan Sr. Sec. Public School, Pandori Khajoor, Hoshiarpur
- Sri Guru Harkrishan Public School, Nanda Chaur, Hoshiarpur
- Sri Guru Harkrishan Public School, Sri Anandpur Sahib
- S.G.S. Khalsa Sr. Sec. School, Sri Anandpur Sahib
- Moolan Devi Middle School, Sri Kiratpur Sahib
- Sri Guru Harkrishan Public School, Chandigarh
- S.G.H. Sr. Sec. Public School, Ludhiana
- S. Desa Singh Majithia Public School, Majitha
- Sri Guru Harkrishan Public School, Kurali
- Sri Guru Harkrishan International School, Kanpur
- Sri Guru Harkrishan Public School, Urban Estate, Kapurthala
- Adrash School, Dhandra, Ludhiana
- Adrash School, Naushehra Pannunan
- Adrash School, Uchha Pind, Kapurthala
- CKD Institute of Management and Technology, Amritsar
- CKD Institute of Management and Technology, Tarn Taran
- CKD International Nursing College, Chabhal Road, Amritsar

== Legacy ==
According to Dharam Singh, the Chief Khalsa Diwan has accomplished three important milestones for the Sikhs in its existence:

1. Formalizing the Singh Sabha perspective of Sikhism as a separate religion from Hinduism, with its own unique rituals and traditions.
2. Creating a united structure where formerly differing Sikh groups could come together and communicate effectively.
3. Formulating a strategy for handling internal conflicts and endurance as a religious minority.
