= Central Khalsa Orphanage =

Location
- GT Road, Putlighar, Amritsar; India
- Coordinates: 31°38′03″N 74°51′00″E

Information
- Other name: Central Khalsa Yatimkhana
- Type: Orphanage
- Religious affiliation(s): Sikhism
- Established: 11 April 1904
- School district: Punjab
- Gender: Boys
- Age range: 6 - 18
- Website: https://centralkhalsaorphanage.org/

The Central Khalsa Orphanage, also known as the Central Khalsa Yatimkhana, is an orphanage for boys in Amritsar, India, established in 1904 by the Chief Khalsa Diwan. It is located on a plot of land covering five acres and has a secondary school, sports facilities, a home for the blind, a guest house, a library and a gurdwara. There is also a re-creation of the room of Indian revolutionary Udham Singh who, during some of his childhood and teens, resided at the orphanage.

The orphanage has produced several Sikh musicians associated with the Golden Temple and other gurdwaras. It houses the first Guru Granth Sahib published in braille, transliterated by Bhai Gurmej Singh who was resident at the orphanage in the 1950s after he became blind from smallpox at the age of ten.

In 2012 the orphanage was noted to have 335 children, of which 27 were blind. In addition to general education up to matriculation, students are also taught Sikh history, classical Indian music and theology, and are eventually initiated.

== Background ==
The Chief Khalsa Diwan was established in 1902 and setting up the orphanage was one of its first tasks. The Central Khalsa Orphanage for boys opened on 11 April 1904, in a rented single room. It is situated on the GT Road, Putlighar, Amritsar. In 2012 it was noted to have 335 children, of which 27 were blind. People considered significant in establishing the orphanage include Sundar Singh Majithia and Bhai Vir Singh. In 1907, the orphanage housed around a dozen children and the superintendent was Sohan Singh, the son of a railway worker. Music teacher Bhai Sain Ditta taught there from 1914 to 1932. Its motto has been "Be a man. Make your way. Make us proud." Since 1904, the orphanage has produced several Sikh musicians associated with the Golden Temple and other gurdwaras.

== Udham Singh ==
The orphanage records confirm that the Indian revolutionary Udham Singh and his older brother, Mukta, were accepted and initiated on 28 October 1907. This date is sometimes reported as 24 October. It was their home during some of their childhood and teens. There, their daily routine included waking at 4 a.m., washing in cold water, followed by two hours of prayers, a basic breakfast and then formal lessons. In 1917, Mukta developed a sudden illness and died at the orphanage. Udham Singh left the orphanage in 1917 to serve Britain in the First World War and returned to the orphanage from the War twice; first after less than six months and then after a year in early 1919. His original room has since been demolished; a re-creation of the room has been constructed as a museum in his memory. The Shaheed Udham Singh Memorial Secondary School, opened in 2015 on the campus, is named for him.

== School for blind boys ==
In 1936 Bhai Vir Singh established a school for blind boys, the Surma Singh Ashram, within the orphanage, with the purpose of teaching kirtan. The ragi Bhai Gurmej Singh, who had been sent to the orphanage in 1950 at age ten after becoming blind from smallpox, learnt braille at the orphanage. He produced the first Gurbani, the Sukhmani Sahib, in braille, which he presented in 1969 during Gurpurb. He later completed a transliteration of the entire Guru Granth Sahib in braille, with the first version going to the orphanage.

== Later years ==
In 2012 the orphanage comprised a 5-acre (2.0 ha) complex with a secondary school, sports facilities, a library, home for the blind, a guest house, a school for teaching Gurbani and Sikh history, and a gurdwara. It also has a computer lab. Students at the orphanage are aged between six and eighteen. They are taught Indian classical music, general secondary education, Sikh history and theology, and are eventually initiated. Following matriculation, students may study further at the Khalsa School for Higher Education.
