= Balbir Singh (Ragi) =

Musical artist (1933 – 2020)

Bhai Balbir Singh Hazuri Ragi
- Balbir Singh (left)

Background information
- Born: 23 March 1933; Mrigindpura, Punjab
- Died: 23 February 2020 (aged 86)
- Genres: Sikh music
- Occupation: Ragi
- Website: web.archive.org/web/20150801022200/http://bhaibalbirsingh.com/

Balbir Singh (23 March 1933 – 23 February 2020) was a Sikh Hazuri Ragi who sang and performed at the Golden Temple in Amritsar for 36 years. He was one of the last masters of traditional Sikh gurbani kirtan of the Golden Temple (kirtan parampara).

== Biography ==
=== Early life and education ===
Balbir Singh was born in his maternal village of Mrigindpura (located near Bhikhiwind), in 1933 to parents Santa Singh and Prasan Kaur. Balbir was the first-born of four brothers. His father, Santa Singh, was an instructor at the Gurmat Vidyalaya in Tarn Taran. Santa Singh was a prominent tabla and pakhawaj proponent.

Balbir Singh received his training in Sikh musicology (Gurbani Kirtan) from his father Santa Singh, his grandfather Kundan Singh, and his great-grandfather Hira Singh. Balbir Singh began to learn how to sing at four-years-old. When Balbir Singh was seven-years-old, he performed publicly for the first-time at Gurdwara Sri Darbar Sahib, Tarn Taran, singing two compositions at his debut performance. Balbir Singh would often accompany his father to musical conferences held at Benaras, Lucknow, Gwalior, Pune, Calcutta, and Delhi, where he was exposed to various masters of traditional Indic music.

Balbir Singh learnt dhrupad from Pandit Nathu Ram, who had been the student of ustad Boota Singh and ustad Shardha Singh. Balbir Singh was taught gurbani kirtan by his older uncle Sohan Singh, who was a ragi of the Golden Temple. Balbir also was a student of ustad Arjan Singh Tarangar. Pandit Krishnarao Pandit taught Balbir khayãl. Balbir learnt the tabla from ustad Habibuddin Khan. Furthermore, he learnt jal-tarang from Giani Gian Singh Almast. Balbir's father taught him the dilruba. Balbir Singh also gave credit to Ghulam Ali Khan, ustad Salamat Ali Khan, and Pandit Dilip Chandra Vedi, as being his mentors.

=== Career ===
Balbir Singh performed at the Golden Temple between the years 1955–1991. One tale purports that Balbir Singh was originally a Nihang but changed his turban-style so that he could be allowed to perform at the Golden Temple. It is claimed that he had 3,000 shabads memorized and could perform over 200 raags. Balbir Singh was able to perform all 31 raags found within the Guru Granth Sahib. Apart from the Golden Temple, Balbir Singh also performed as a ragi at Takht Sri Patna Sahib in Patna and Gurdwara Sis Ganj Sahib in Delhi.

After his retirement, he continued to perform throughout India and recorded almost 30 albums. A 2-set CD-ROM titled Sikh Virasat was released containing 50 musical recordings of Balbir Singh performing shabad and raag kirtan, totalling four hours of content. Balbir Singh released a multivolume of shabads titled Guldasta of the performance of all the raags found within the Guru Granth Sahib.

In 2015, a video arose of Balbir Singh bowing to guru Ashutosh of the Noormehal dera (Divya Jyoti Jagrati Sansthan) and using gurbani to exalt him. In-response, the Akal Takht issued a ban against Balbir Singh performing gurbani kirtan and issued a formal punishment against him. Balbir Singh later apologized for his actions during the video, claiming he did not know his fans were taking him to Ashutosh's residence on that day and the poster of the video is conspiring against him.

=== Death ===
Balbir Singh died on 23 February 2020 due to a long-term illness. The Shiromani Ragi Sabha mourned his death. Balbir Singh's remains were cremated at a crematorium located near Shaheed Ganj Baba Deep Singh.

== Awards ==
- Shiromani Ragi Award (1983) from the Akal Takht
- Kendriya Singh Sabha (1987)
- Chief Khalsa Diwan (1991)
- Vismaad Naad Ludhiana (1991)
- Sant Sujan Singh (1994)
- Bhai Mardana Yadgari Award (1995)
- President of India Hon’ble Shri K. R. Narayanan (1996)
- Sardar Prakash Singh Badal, and Bhai Batan Singh Memorial Award (1997)
- Gurmat Sangeet award by Jawaddi Taksal, at Gurdwara Gur Gian Parkash, Ludhiana (1999)
- Punjab Languages Department (2001) from the Honorable Chief Minister of Punjab
- Sant Sarwan Singh Gandharva Award (2001)
- S.G.P.C., Amritsar (2004)
- Bhai Mardana Gurmat Sangeet Vidyalaya and Missionary Society, Midland, UK (2006)
- Bhai Dilbagh Singh Kirtaniya Samrat Award as well as Bhai Nand Lal Goya Sanman by Guru
- Nanak Dev University, Amritsar (2010)
- National Sangeet Natak Academy Award (2012), being the first ragi from the Harmandir Sahib tradition to be honored with this award
