= Five virtues =

In Sikhism, fundamental qualities which one should develop in order to reunite with God

In Sikhism, the Five virtues, also known as the Panj Gun, are fundamental qualities which one should develop in order to reach Mukti, or to reunite or merge with God. The Sikh Gurus taught that these positive human qualities were Sat (truth), Daya (compassion), Santokh (contentment), Nimrata (humility), and Pyaar (love). According to William Hewat McLeod, the five virtues are instead truth, contentment, compassion, patience, and fulfillment of dharma.

== Sat ==
Sat is the virtue of truthful living, which means practising "righteousness, honesty, justice, impartiality and fair play."

The Lord's humble servants are True — they practice Truth, and reflect upon the Word of the Guru's Shabad. The True Lord God unites them with Himself, and they keep the True Lord enshrined in their hearts. O Nanak, through the Name, I have obtained salvation and understanding; this alone is my wealth.

— Guru Granth Sahib, ang 600

== Santokh ==
Santokh, or contentment, is freedom "from ambition, envy, greed and jealousy. Without contentment, it is impossible to acquire peace of mind."

Practice truth, contentment and kindness; this is the most excellent way of life. One who is so blessed by the Formless Lord God renounces selfishness, and becomes the dust of all.

— Guru Granth Sahib, ang 51

== Daya ==
The exercise of Daya, or compassion, involves "considering another's difficulty or sorrow as one's own and helping to relieve it as far as possible. Compassion also includes the overlooking of imperfections and mistakes of others, for to err is human."

Be kind to all beings-this is more meritorious than bathing at the sixty-eight sacred shrines of pilgrimage and the giving of charity.

— Guru Granth Sahib, ang 136

== Nimrata ==
Nimrata, translated as "humility", "benevolence", or "humbleness", is the fourth virtue.

ਮਿਠਤੁ ਨੀਵੀ ਨਾਨਕਾ ਗੁਣ ਚੰਗਿਆਈਆ ਤਤੁ ॥ Humility, Nanak Says is the essence, the very root of all virtues

— Guru Granth Sahib, ang 470

The God-conscious being is steeped in humility.

— Guru Granth Sahib, ang 273

== Pyaar ==
Pyaar requires Sikhs to be filled with the love of God.

Let the Fear of God be your feet, and let His Love be your hands; let His Understanding be your eyes.

— Guru Granth Sahib, ang 139

== See also ==
- Five precepts (in Buddhism)
