= The Khalsa Advocate =

Weekly Sikh newspaper

- The Monthly English Organ of the Sikhs (original)
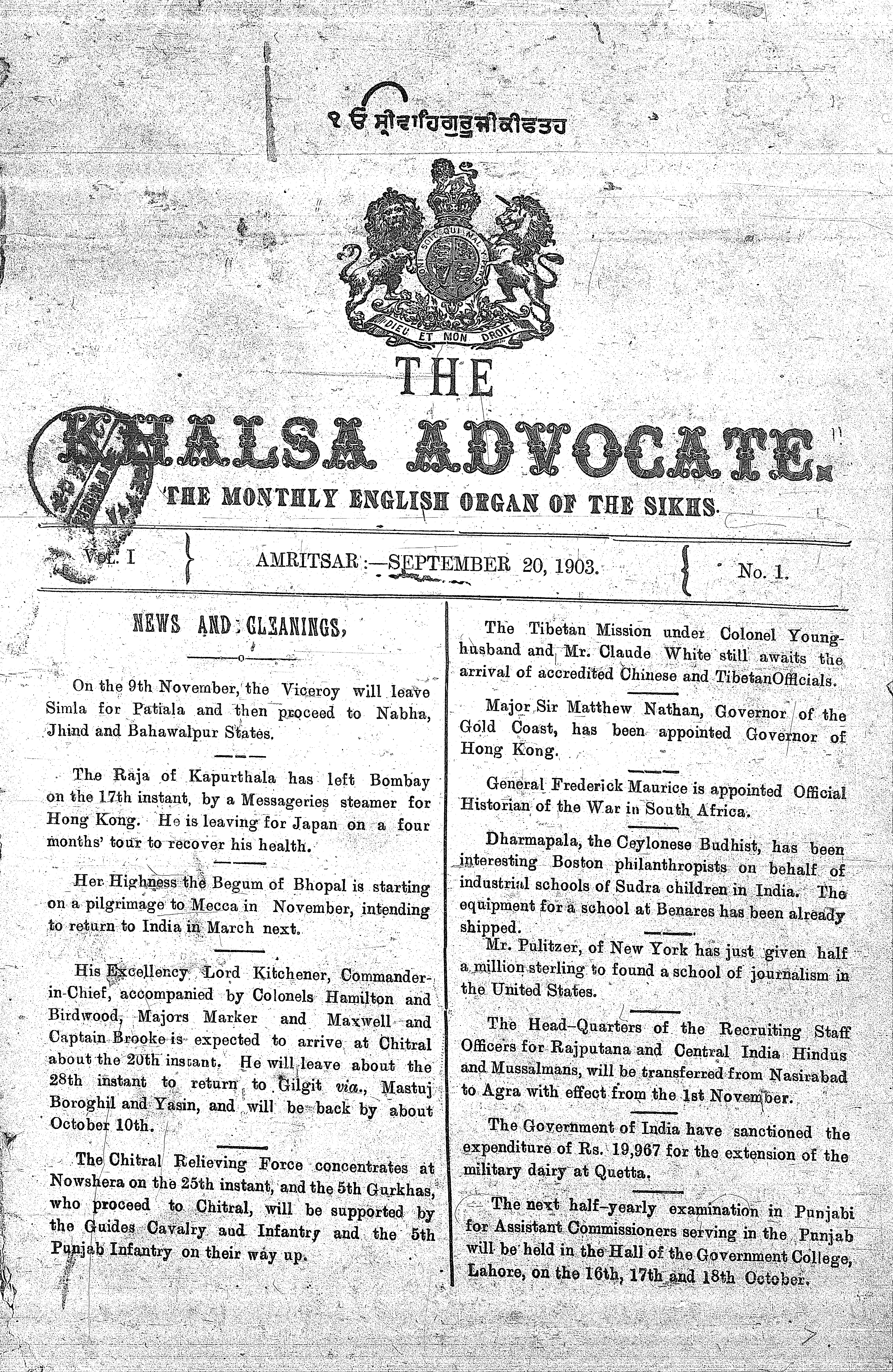
- Front page of the first issue, 20 September 1903
- Type: Weekly newspaper
- Founder: Jodh Singh
- Publisher: Chief Khalsa Diwan
- Founded: 20 September 1903 (first issue)
- Ceased publication: 1923
- Relaunched: Relaunched as The Khalsa Te Khalsa Advocate (in Punjabi) in 1923 onwards
- Language: English

The Khalsa Advocate was a Sikh newspaper in English founded in 1903 by the Chief Khalsa Diwan. It was one of the most prominent and influential Sikh periodicals prior to 1920.

== History ==
=== Background ===
By the turn of the 20th century, English-language journals had become popular amongst the literate Sikhs of the Punjab. In 1899, an English newspaper titled simply as The Khalsa was founded by Bhagat Lakshman Singh. The Khalsa had a lifespan of two years, after which its production ceased. However, the paper had an impact on showing the resoluteness of the Sikhs to reach a Western audience, such as the British and Punjabis who did not know how to read their ethnic language.

=== Establishment and work ===
The newspaper was launched in 1903 as a monthly newspaper that acted as the official mouthpiece of the Chief Khalsa Diwan. It was founded by a group of Sikhs led by Jodh Singh. Its purpose was to provide a medium of expression for Sikh feelings and aspirations. It led the deliberations on Sikh issues of the time. It was published out of Amritsar. The newspaper was the foremost of the Sikh newspapers published in English of the era and had a circulation of around 1,000.

The newspaper supported the Gurdwara Reform movement. In the summertime of 1906, the newspaper advocated that it was a necessity that the administration of the Golden Temple and other gurdwaras be changed so social evils could be extinguished from their premises. It supported an idea of the appointment of a manager (sarbrah) of the Golden Temple that was elected by the wider Sikh community (panth), not personally appointed by the government. In the 9 June 1917 issue of the newspaper, it complained about the corruption and mismanagement widespread in the Golden Temple.

The newspaper was a supporter of Punjabi being used as the language of instruction and that the decision over the script used should be left for the parents to decide.

The newspaper was a supporter of the empowerment of women. It spoke out against the practice of dowry, child marriage, domestic violence, polygamy, marriage mismatch, lavish weddings, and observing purdah. It promoted the acceptance of widow remarriage. The periodical stigmatized prostitution.

After 1923, the newspaper was continued in Punjabi rather than English under the title The Khalsa Te Khalsa Advocate.

The newspaper often published writings by Vir Singh and also covers the activities of all the institutions, schools, and colleges run by the Chief Khalsa Diwan.

==== Taglines ====
The newspaper used multiple taglines throughout its existence, they are as follows:

- "The Monthly English Organ of the Sikhs."
- "The Only English Weekly of the Sikhs."
- "An English Weekly of the Sikhs"

== Digitization ==
Digitized issues from 1903–1923 (803 issues) held by the University of Washington are available at JSTOR as part of the South Asia Open Archives (SAOA). Digitized issues are also available at the CRL (Center for Research Libraries) Digital Delivery System.
