= Nirmal Singh Khalsa =

Indian priest and singer

Bhai & Panth Ratan Nirmal Singh Khalsa Hazoori Ragi Darbar Sahib
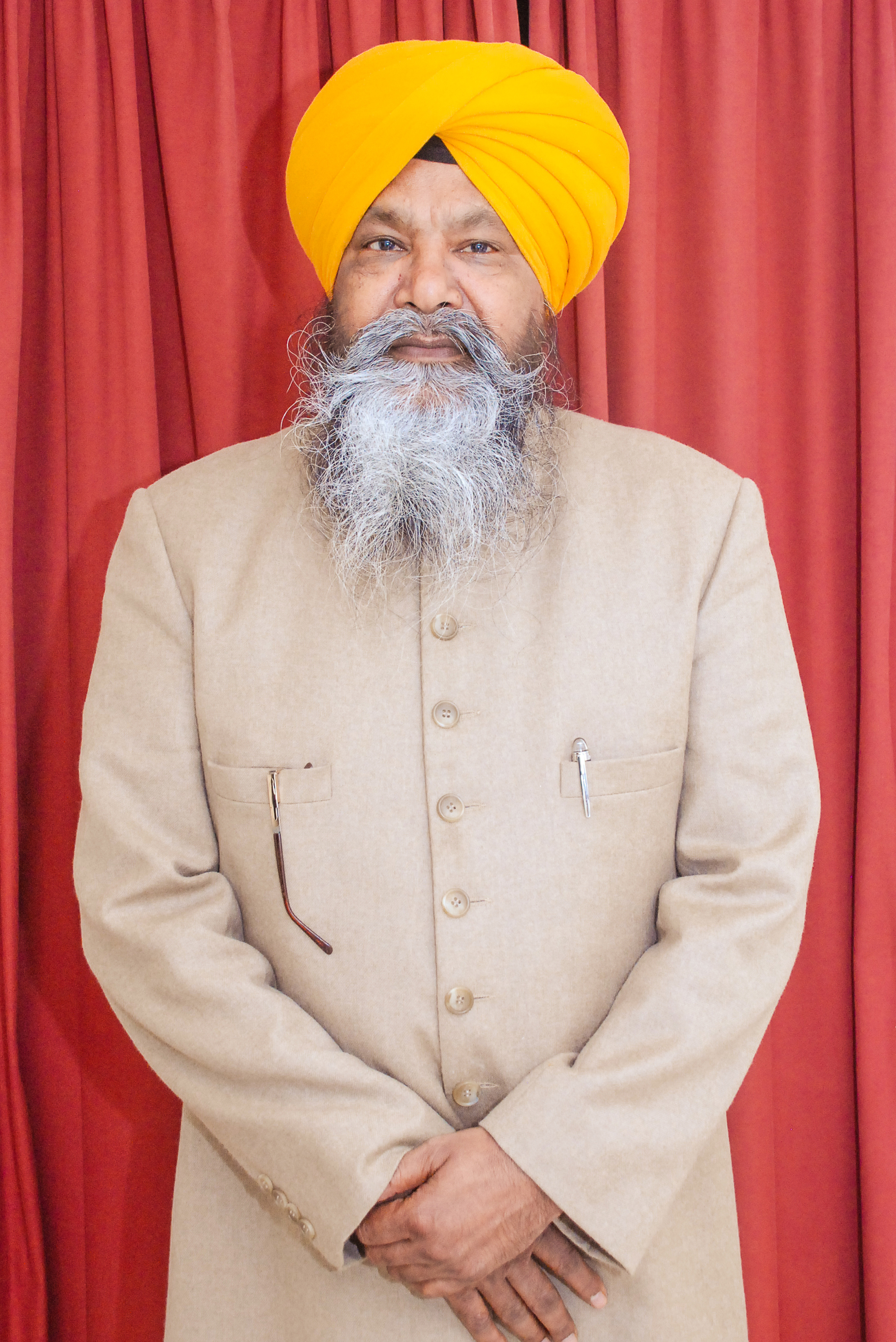
- Singh Khalsa in September 2011
- Born: 12 April 1952; Jandwala Bhimeshah, Ferozepur, Punjab, India
- Died: 2 April 2020 (aged 67); Amritsar, Punjab, India
- Resting place: Fatehgarh Shukarchak
- Education: Shaheed Missionary College
- Occupations: Music teacher; Ragi
- Title: Hazoori Ragi
- Children: 3
- Awards: Padma Shri (2009)
- Website: Padma Shri Bhai Nirmal Singh Khalsa

Bhai Nirmal Singh Khalsa (12 April 1952 – 2 April 2020) was a Sikh Hazoori Ragi of Darbar Sahib in Amritsar, Punjab, India.

== Early life and career ==
Bhai Nirmal Singh was born on 12 April 1952 at Jandwala Bhimeshah in Fazilka, Punjab. In 1976, he graduated with a Diploma in Gurmat Sangeet from Shaheed Missionary College, Amritsar. In 1977–78, he served as a music teacher at Gurmat College in Rishikesh and later taught at Shaheed Sikh Missionary College in Sri Ganganagar, Rajasthan. From 1979, he started serving as a Hazoori Ragi at Darbar Sahib. He had performed Kirtan at all five Takhts, various historical Gurdwaras across South Asia and in 71 countries overall. Bhai Sahib was a highly regarded ragi with knowledge of all 31 Raags of Guru Granth Sahib.

For services in the field of arts, Bhai Nirmal Singh Khalsa was awarded the Padma Shri, the fourth highest civilian award in the Republic of India, in 2009. He was the first Hazoori Ragi to receive this award.

== Death ==
On 2 April 2020, Nirmal Singh Khalsa died due to cardiac arrest after testing positive for COVID-19, at Guru Nanak Dev Hospital in Amritsar. His body was cremated at village Fatehgarh Shukarchak in Amritsar.
