= Jodh Singh =

Sikh theologian

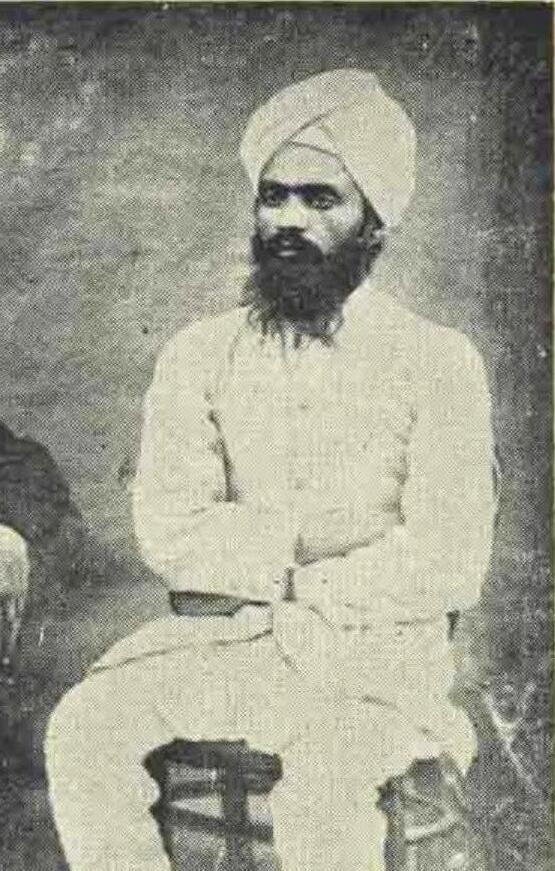
Photograph of Jodh Singh in his youth

Bhai Jodh Singh (1882–1981) was a Sikh theologian, author, mentor and social activist.

== Biography ==
He played an important role in the Singh Sabha movement. In 1903, he was the leader of a group of Sikhs who established The Khalsa Advocate, an English-language Sikh newspaper. He was a recipient of the civilian honour of the Padma Bhushan.

== See also ==
- Sikhism
