= Bhasaur =

- village
- Punjab, Location in India
- Coordinates: 30.439045°N 75.893990°E
- Country: India
- ਰਾਜ: Punjab
- District: Sangrur

Languages
  - Official: Punjabi
- Time zone: UTC+5:30 (IST)

The village of Bhasaur is situated on state Highway No. 11 between Dhuri and Maler Kotla towns in Sangrur District of East Punjab. New Delhi is around 240 km and the state capital is 140 km away. Nearby villages include Ranchna (Rajinderapuri), Banbhauri, Babbanpur, Sangala, Sangali, Himtana (Lachabaddi).

== Demographics ==
The majority of the population is Jatt (Sikh) of Jawandha Gotra. The rest are spread among Muslims, Bania (mahajan), Brahmins, Bairagi Sadh, Tonk Kashatriya (Chheeba), Tarkhan (Ramgarhia), Nai, Mehra and Dalit. This secular village supports Gurdwara sahib, Mandirs and Mosques.

== Temples and festivals ==
There is one Googa Madi Temple adjoining the state Highway. The Googa Naumi festival falls in the month of August. Lal Kheda is another temple by the side of Gurdwara Sahib. Every Tuesday evening crowds offer prayers there. There are two Gurdwaras in Village. The Singh Sabah Gurudwara is Historical Gurudwara. Where a Punjab's first Women college is established.

== Education ==
Bhasaur has a higher secondary school. Nearby Colleges include Government College Maler Kotla, Des Bhagat College Bardwal and Bhai Gurdas College of Engineering Sangrur, situated on Bhawnigarh Road.

== Transportation ==
Dhuri Junction is the nearest railway station, 7 km from the village. The nearest airport is 140 km in Chandigarh. A bus service is available.
