= Ragi (Sikhism) =

Sikh musician who plays hymns in different ragas

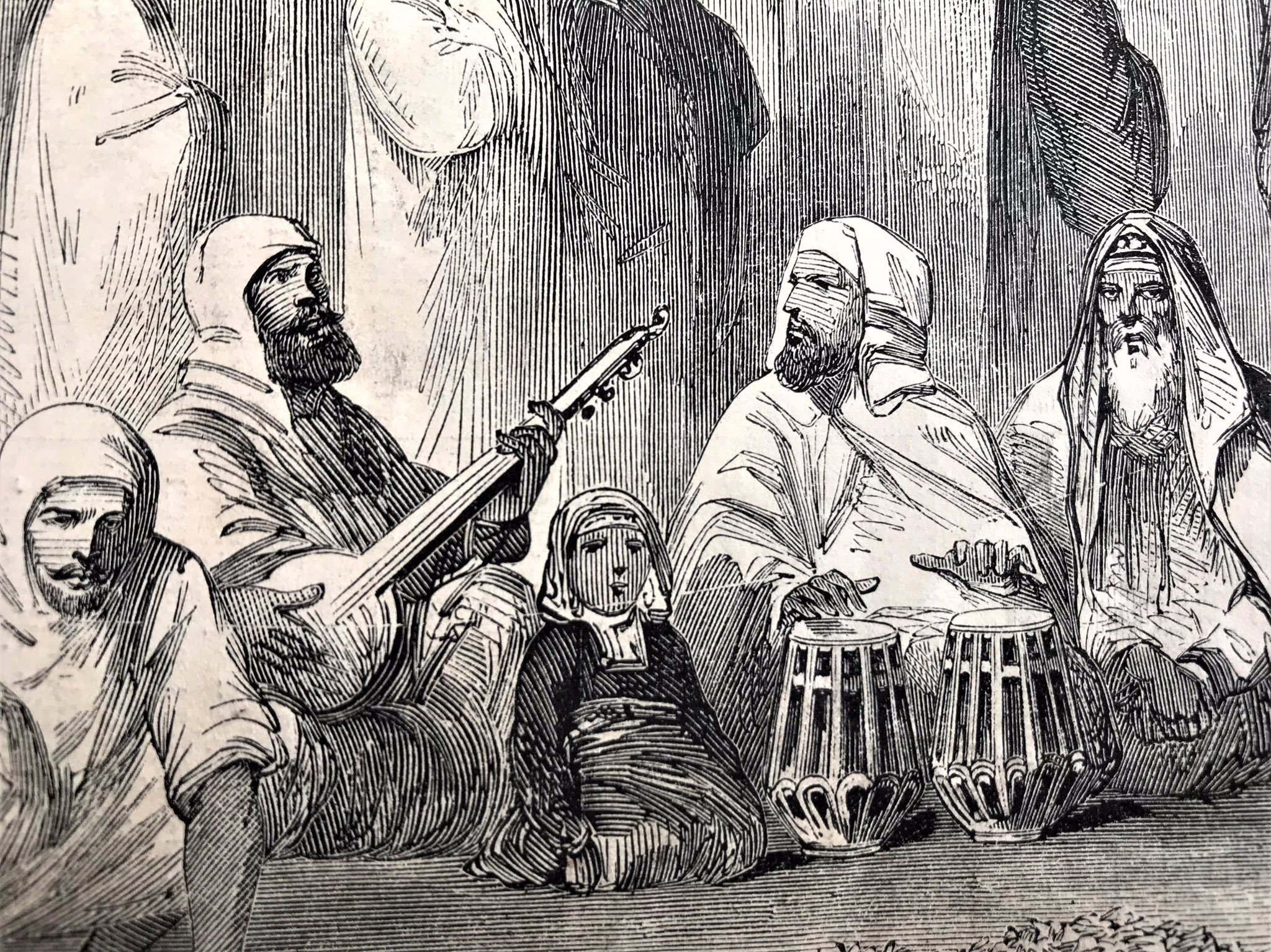
1860 artwork depicting ragis in Darbar Sahib

A Ragi (Punjabi: ਰਾਗੀ; rāgī) is a Sikh musician who plays hymns (shabads) in different ragas as prescribed in the Guru Granth Sahib.

== Role ==
Professional Sikh musical performances are usually done within gurdwaras. Within the central room, there is a dedicated space beside the sacred scripture for the rāgī jathā (ragi ensemble) on an elevated stage. The ragis sit on the elevated stage facing the gathered Sikh congregation in the room, who sit directly on the floor at a lower level. Kirtan is performed within the gurdwaras on both regular and celebratory days. For the major and popular gurdwaras, Sunday (Aitavāra) tends to be the day where more kirtan performances are held throughout the day whilst for other days, kirtan performances usually occur in the evening time.

This is the interior of the Gurdwara Guru Nanak Punjabi Sabha Chakala, Mumbai, India. The raised stage to the right is where Ragi Jathas sit and perform Sikh music.

Kirtan within gurdwara is usually performed by the ragi jathi, typically consisting of three members in modern-times but four members in historical-times. Aside from being required to perform musically, they also are needed to perform the liturgy services. The ragis are traditionally all male and are given the honorifical prefix of Bhāī (literally, "brother"). In modern-times, there has been a rise of female ragi jathas, whose members are given the honorifical prefix of Bībī (literally, "lady"). Mixed-gender ragi jathas are exceedingly rare. Ragis are not allowed to use caste-based surnames and thus only keep the names 'Singh' and 'Kaur' as a surname, some may further add the word 'Khalsa' to their name. However, it is acceptable for ragis to attach a location-based or employment-based suffix to their name for disambiguation purposes, such as Dilli Vale ("from Delhi") or Hazuri Ragi Harmandir Sahib ("ragi in service at the Harmandir Sahib gurdwara"). The ragi jatha members tend to wear simplistic clothes, usually white or off-white long shirts and pants. Ragi males tend to wear white, navy, saffron, or black turbans and female ragis wear long scarves (chunnī). Younger ragis have started wearing different colours outside of traditional range. Ragis are paid a regular salary whilst employed at a gurdwara but they can also perform at private events for extra income. Ragi jathas performing at a ticketed venue is taboo.

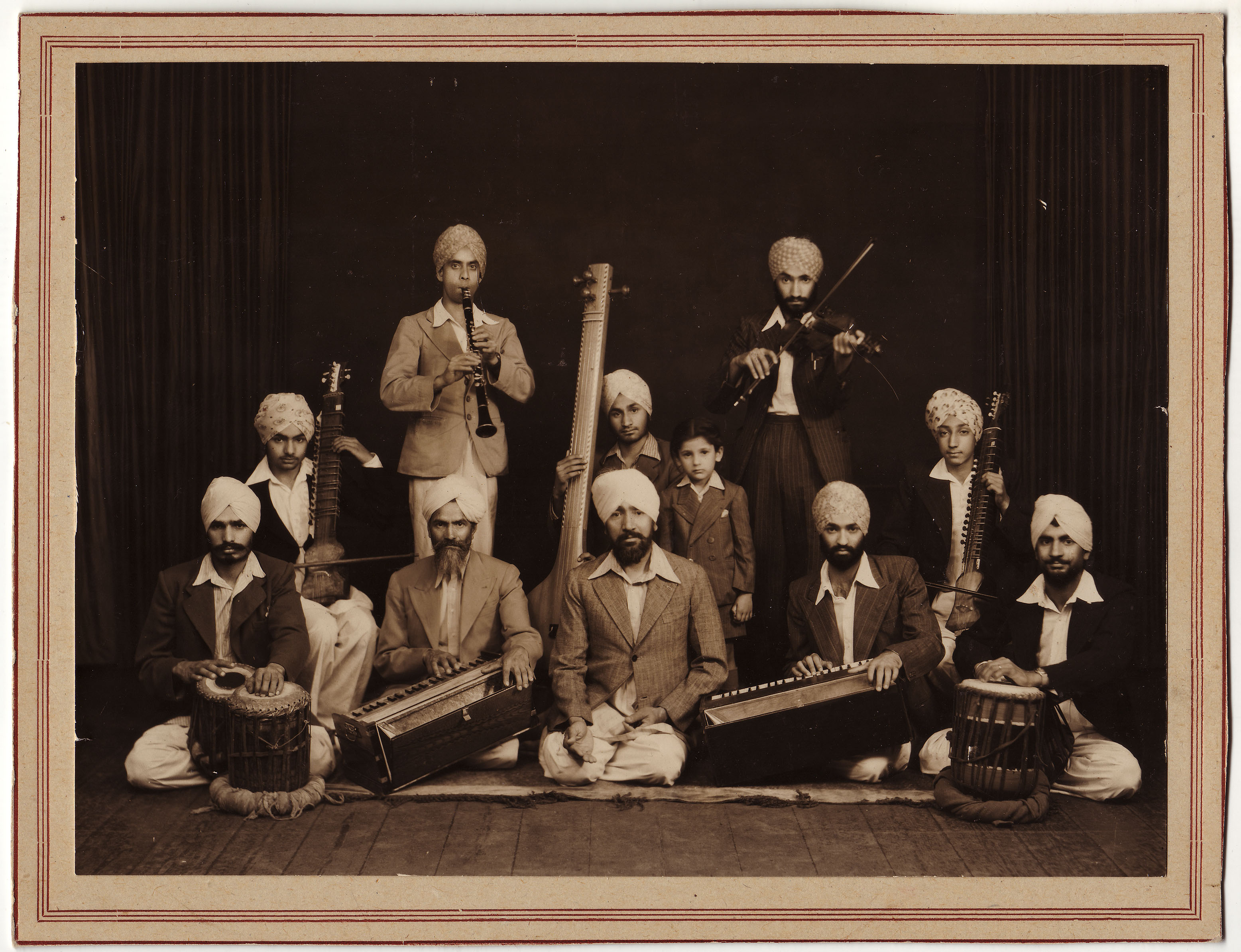
Sikh Rāgis Kirtan Jatha. Nairobi, 1942.

What is now termed "traditional" (but it is not truly historically accurate to apply this appellation to this type as truly traditional kirtan differs substantially from what is described here) ragi jatha kirtan performances in gurdwaras nowadays employ simple melodies which are set to basic varieties of tāl—usually the 8-beat kahirvā but also the 6-beat dādrā. The performance of gurbani kirtan within gurdwaras was simplified to allow for the gathered congregation (sadh sangat) to be able to follow along and sing with the performers, it also allows for the laypersons to internalize the message of the underlying hymn rather than focus too much on the musical expression itself. The singing by vocalists is interspersed by supportive and harmonizing melodies played by the harmonium, with the drummer playing variations utilizing the tabla in "tempo and rhythmic variety". All these factors are geared towards producing a calm and spiritual setting and experience for the participants. Presentation and performance are the two important factors of the "traditional" ragi kirtan performance type. Lines from certain hymns tend to be repeated to allow for the listeners to join in on the singing. Various genres found within the "traditional" ragi kirtan sub-type are gīt, ghazal, and bhajan. The most renowned and well-received performer of the "traditional" ragi kirtan style is Bhai Harjinder Singh Srinagar Vale.

However, the truly traditional ragi kirtan style, as found in earlier times, employed stringed instruments rather than the now commonplace harmonium. It also involved more ragas in its performances. Traditional Sikhs attempting to revive the more historical expressions of their music, such as by playing instruments like the rabab, saranda, and taus, are referred to as the gurmat sangīt genre of kirtan. It is largely based upon the contemporary khyāl style of Hindustani classical music.

There are two different kinds of shabad kirtan performances by ragi jathas:

1. Parmāṇ-style kirtan - characterized by the ragi interspersing verses from related hymns to elaborate on the main, overarching theme.
2. Viākhiā-style kirtan - characterized by the ragi pausing the singing to elaborate on the hymn being performed and present a short discourse or exposition.

There now exists various Sikh educational institutions solely dedicated to teaching Sikh music, that specialize in the training of ragis. However, traditionally the training of ragis occurred at more general Sikh educational institutions (known as a ṭaksāl), which had a section dedicated for the training of Sikh musicians, such as at the Damdami Taksal near Amritsar or Jawaddi Kalan in Ludhiana. Training of Sikh kirtanis usually starts when they are young and aside from their musical training, they are also educated in the Sikh scriptures and correct pronunciation of their contents (known as santhiya). True mastery of kirtan requires a deep understanding and knowledge of Sikh philosophy, history, and culture. According to the late Bhai Avtar Singh, a preeminent ragi of his time, the most important criteria for becoming a good kirtankar was first living a life in line with the principles set out in the Guru Granth Sahib, and then an education in its prescribed ragas.

== Hazuri Ragi ==
The term Hazuri Ragi, also spelt as a Hazoori Ragi ("designated cantor") is a title that refers to a ragi who serve at the Golden Temple in Amritsar who can perform shabad hymns as per their traditionally prescribed raag as designated by the Guru Granth Sahib. The title is often appended to the names these ragis.

=== List of prominent Hazuri Ragis ===
- Giani Nirmal Singh
- Bhai Balbir Singh

== History ==
Developing alongside the earlier Rababi tradition as a parallel tradition were the kīrtankārs, who were Sikh kirtan singers. The institution was born out of a few amateur or non-professional singers during the period of the Sikh gurus. As time went-on, this amateur trend of Sikh singers eventually developed into the professional tradition now known as rāgīs.

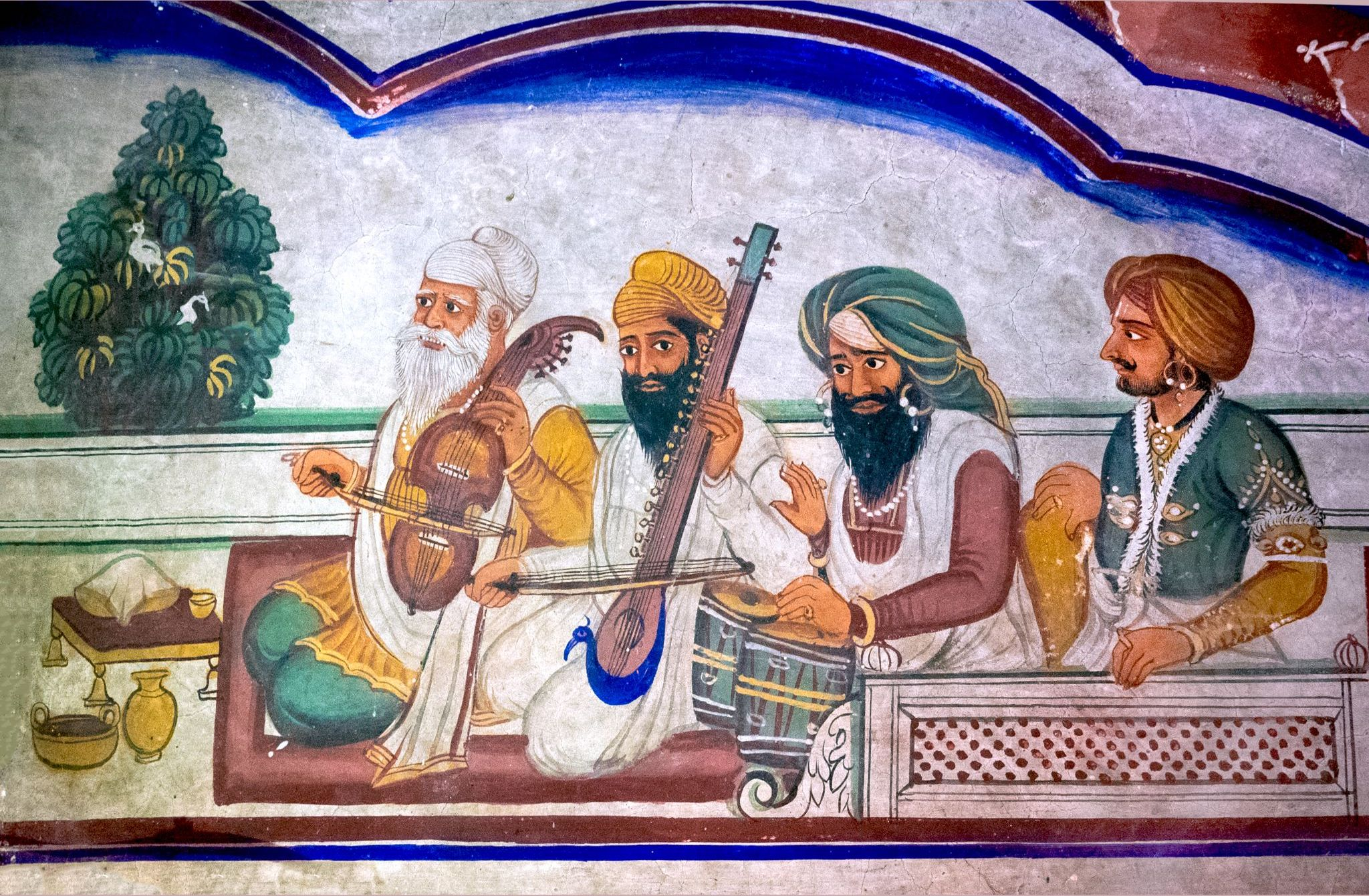
Detail of a fresco depicting a Sikh ragi jatha musically performing using traditional instruments in the presence of Guru Amar Das from Asthan Baba Bikram Singh Bedi, Kanak Mandi, Amritsar, ca.1863–1879

Guru Arjan Dev, the 5th Guru of the Sikhs, started the ragi tradition of amateur musicians, as he did not want the Sikhs to depend on professionals for their connection to the divine with sacred music. Ragis now are often professional and have much knowledge of the scriptures. Thus, they are highly respected. However, they are not a privileged elite as some today see them -- rather, the ragi tradition was meant to bring musical experience of the Sikh scriptures to a layperson, without a middleman (or woman).

Some notable Sikh kirtankars during the period of the Sikh gurus include:

- Dipa and Bula, both of whom served Guru Angad
- Narain Das, Padha, and Ugrsain, all three of whom served Guru Amar Das
- Ramu, Jhaju, and Mukand, all three of whom served Guru Arjan
- Banvali and Parsram, both of whom served Guru Hargobind
- Gulab Rai, Bhel, Mansud, and Gurbaksh, all four of whom served Guru Tegh Bahadur

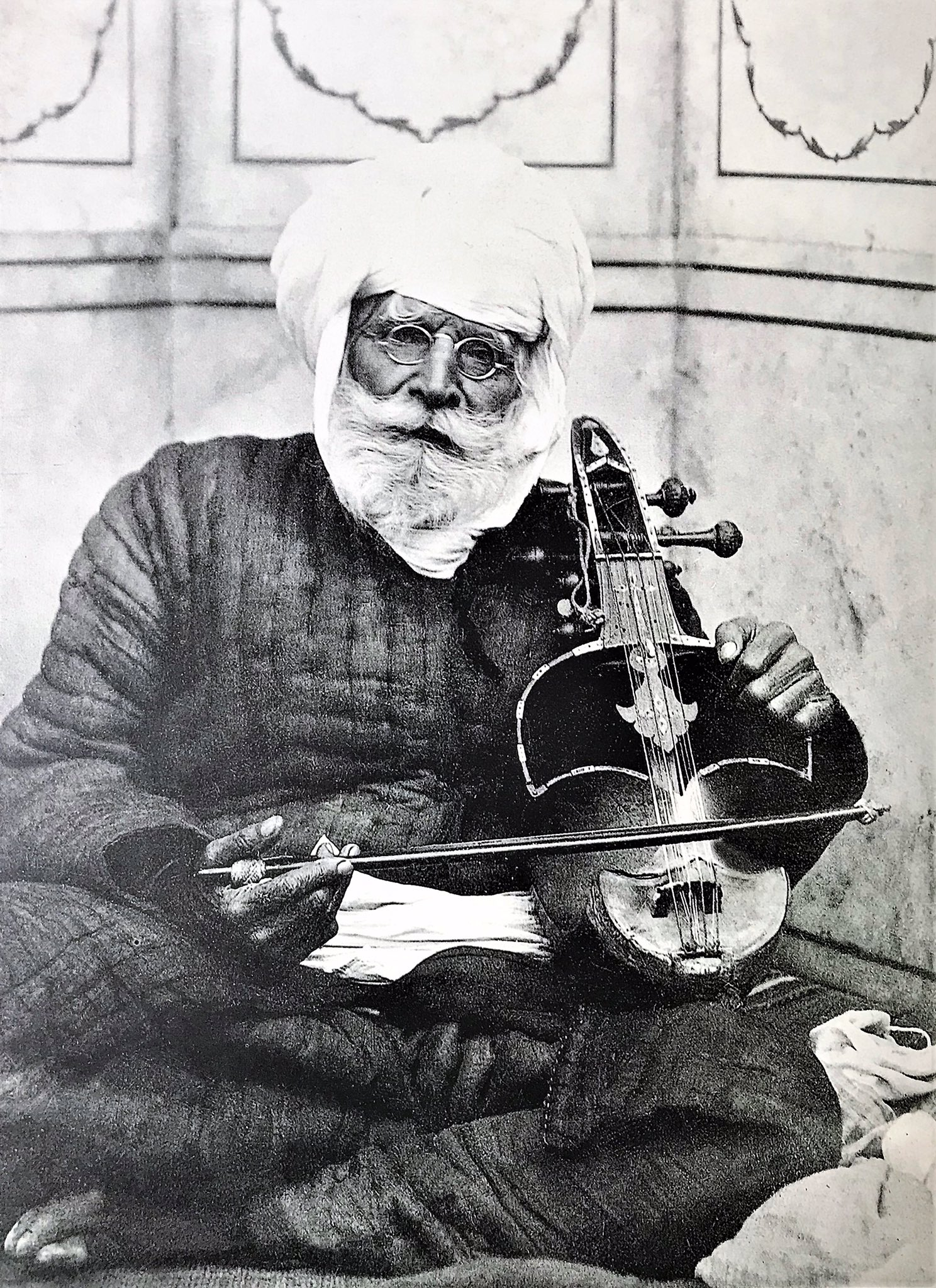
Photograph of the Sikh ragi Sham Singh, who performed kirtan music at the Golden Temple complex for 70 years.

A renowned ragi or kirtankar during the reign of Maharaja Ranjit Singh's Sikh Empire was Bhai Mansa Singh, who performed at the Golden Temple. Similar to the rababi tradition, the ragi tradition also received the patronage of Sikh polities, such as by Nabha, Patiala, and Kapurthala. One notable ragi who received the sponsorship of Sikh states was Baba Pushkara Singh. Bhai Sham Singh is renowned for his long service as a ragi at the Golden Temple, serving as a kirtan performer for some 70 years around the later 19th and early 20th century. Notable ragis of the early 20th century include Hira Singh, Santa Singh, Sunder Singh, Sammund Singh, Surjan Singh, and Gopal Singh. Later on in the same century, names of ragis like Bhai Jwala Singh (a tenth generation member of a traditional kirtankar family), his sons Avtar Singh and Gurcharan Singh, are important to note. Furthermore, Balbir Singh and Dyal Singh should also be mentioned.

Today, the ragi tradition is slightly different than in the Guru's time. Music is often not sung in the correct raag and often does not use the Guru's instruments but rather relies heavily on the harmonium, brought by the British colonizers. The lines of the shabads before the rahaos are not emphasized as they are prescribed either. Today also there are no female ragis allowed in Sri Harimandir Sahib, the most important temple for Sikhs, which goes against the Sikh principle of gender equality. Now, some efforts are being made to revive Gurmat Sangeet, kirtan the way the Gurus prescribed it.
