= Daya (Sikhism) =

Daya (Punjabi: ਦਯਾ or ਦਇਆ, pronunciation: [d̪eɪäː], meaning compassion) is a fundamental teaching of the Sikh religion and teachings. The other four fundamental qualities are truth (sat), contentment (santokh), humility (nimrata) and love (pyaar). These five qualities are essential to a Sikh and it is their duty to meditate and recite the Gurbani so that these virtues become a part of their mind.

The importance of daya can be seen from the following Shabads from Guru Granth Sahib:

You have no compassion; the Lord’s Light does not shine in you.
You are drowned, drowned in worldly entanglements. (4)

— Sri Guru Granth Sahib page 903 Full Shabad

Daya says to not ignore tragedies that take place in the world but to face them head-on and do whatever is possible within one's means. As a Sikh one must feel the pain and suffering of other people involved in any tragedy.

== Bibliography ==
- Concepts In Sikhism - Edited by Dr. Surinder Singh Sodhi

Above adapted from article By J. S. Neki
