= Santokh =

Contentment, one of five virtues that is promoted in Sikhism

Santokh (Punjabi: ਸੰਤੋਖ, pronunciation: [sant̪ɔukʰ], meaning contentment) is one of the five virtues that is vigorously promoted by the Sikh Gurus. The other four qualities in the arsenal are: "Truth" (Sat), "Compassion" (Daya), "Humility" (Nimrata) and "Love" (Pyare). These five qualities are essential to a Sikh and it is their duty to meditate and recite the Gurbani so that these virtues become a part of their mind.

== Terms ==
The common term used is Santokh but another term used is Sabr.

== Description ==
Contentment is another very important virtue in Sikhism. Instead of constantly thinking of how to satisfy personal desires, Sikhs try to accept the circumstances of their lives and concentrate on acting in accordance with God’s Will (Hukam). They try to remember that all aspects of life are a result of God’s Will. Contentment leads to freedom from care, fear and worry. It is a divine quality, a deep godly "priceless jewel", which is acquired by those souls who move on the path of Sach Khand.

When desires vanish the state of contentment is reached, "Sat Santokh". Desires are the reason for our sorrows and pains; it is a search for an escape from these sorrows and pains. In fulfilling desires the person gets momentary happiness; unfulfilled desires bring disappointment. A continuous string of disappointments leads to depression and to mental and physical sicknesses.

Desires lead to mental and physical distortion of the mind, whereas contentment brings peace and calmness to the mind. Calmness and fulfilment bring us closer to the Almighty, because complete peace allows the mind to focus on the ultimate reality, the Akal Purakh.

Santokh is expounded as the solution for lobh (greed).

== Scriptural excerpts ==
Dhoul Dharam da-i-aa kaa poot.
santokh thaap rakhi-aa jin soot.

—Guru Granth Sahib, page 3, line 73
Translation:

Dharma (religion) is the son of compassion;
Contentment patiently holds the earth in its place.

sat santokh da-i-aa kamaavai ayh karnee saar.

—Guru Granth Sahib, page 51, line 2072
Translation:

Practice truth, contentment and kindness; this is the most excellent way of life.

sach santokh sahj sukh banee pooray gur tay paavni-aa.

—Guru Granth Sahib, page 115, line 4670
Translation:

Truth, contentment and intuitive peace and poise are obtained from the Bani, the Word of the Perfect Guru.
