= Nimrata =

Sikh virtue of humility or benevolence

Nimrata (Gurmukhi: ਨਿਮਰਤਾ nimaratā) is an important virtue that is vigorously promoted by Gurbani and Sikh history. It is alternatively known as Gareebi. The literal translation of this Punjabi word is "Humility", or "Benevolence". The other four virtues are: Truth (Sat), Contentment (Santokh), Compassion (Daya) and Love (Pyaar).

== Practice ==
During a langar meals; among Sikhs, they are expected to serve the meal with humility (nimrata).
