= Pyaar =

Sanskrit term

Pyaar (Hindi: प्यार pjɑːɾ; Punjabi: ਪਿਆਰ pi'āra) is the Hindustani and Punjabi word for love. It is derived from Sanskrit priya (love) and kāra (act). It is one of the five virtues of Sikhism.

== Description ==
Pyaar is prescribed by the Sikh gurus as the treatment for Kaam (extreme sexual desire, one of the five thieves). Regarding the usage of pyaar for sublimating kaam, Guru Gobind Singh makes the following remark:

Hear ye all, I proclaim here the truth: only they who love God find Him.

— Guru Gobind Singh

The ideal relationship between the divine and devotee in Sikhism is envisioned as a soul-bride, in which the devotee is a wife longing for her husband (kant), which is God. This is a recurring theme through the Sikh canon. The devotee is pained by the state of being separate from God and craves reunion with God. This procedure of complete devotion stifles the negative potentials of kaam and redirects its energy to spiritual progress for the individual.

Guru Arjan states on page 534 of the Guru Granth Sahib that a person who has truly fallen in love with God humbly seeks neither positions of power, authority, nor even spiritual liberation (mukti), but a glimpse of Waheguru and the "Sanctuary of the Sants."

== See also ==
- Five virtues
