= History of the Dasam Granth =

History of the secondary Sikh scripture, the Dasam Granth

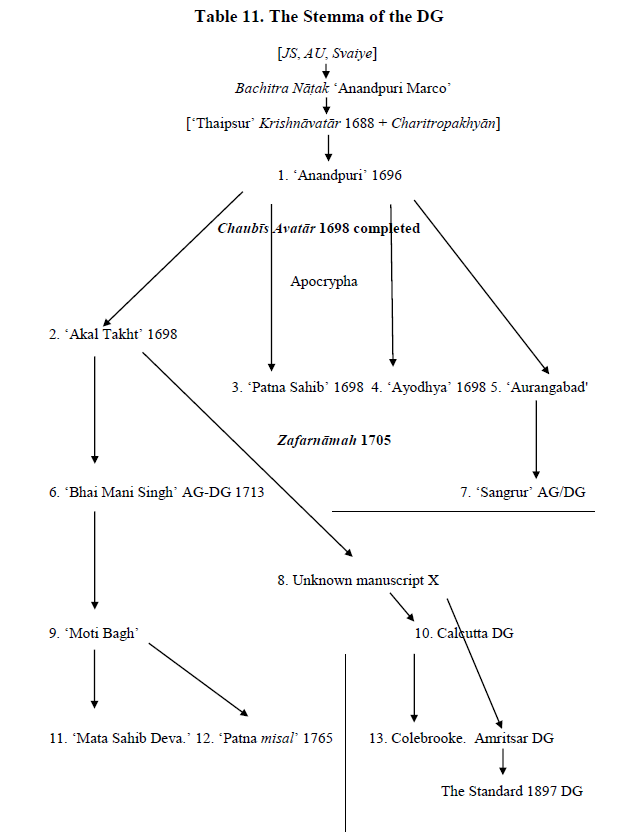
Lineage chart showing the formulation of the Dasam Granth

The history of the Dasam Granth is related to the time of creation and compilation of various writings by Guru Gobind Singh in form of small booklets, some of which are Sikh prayers. The first combined-codex manuscripts of the Dasam Granth were created during the Guru period. It is also said that after 1708, the Dasam Granth was allegedly compiled by Mani Singh, contributed by other Khalsa armymen under direct instructions of Mata Sundari and this volume is recognized as Sri Dasam Granth Sahib (according to a letter attributed to Mani Singh). The present day Dasam Granth includes Jaap Sahib, Akal Ustat, Bachitar Natak, Chandi Charitar Ukati Bilas, Chandi Charitar II, Chandi di Var, Gyan Prabodh, Chaubis Avtar, Rudra Avtar, 33 Sawaiye, Khalsa Mahima, Shashtar Nam Mala Purana, Ath Pakh-yaan Charitar Likh-yatay and Zafarnamah.

In the 18th century, the text was viewed by Sikhs as the guru-incarnate, however doubts arose regarding its authenticity in the 20th century. Some argue that Guru Gobind Singh did not compile the book himself, and the historic authenticity of some of the later additions to the Dasam Granth (apocrypha) is questioned by scholars. There is a prevalent view that the Dasam Granth was written by Nirmala scholars or Hindu Pundits or Saktas scholars, possibly under the patronage of the British, and was an attempt to Hinduize Sikhism. According to them, some of the compositions included in Dasam Granth (such as Charitropakhyan) are out of tune with other Sikh scriptures, and must have been composed by other poets.

According to Giani Gian Singh, the Ram Raiyas of Payal, part of a heretical Sikh sect, were the first recorded critics of Dasam Granth in Sikh history, who attacked on Ragi Bulaki Singh for reading hymns of Dasam Granth. (Ram Raiyas were considered enemies of the Gurus and one of the Panj Mel; founder Ram Rai was ex-communicated by Guru Har Rai for his appeasement of the Mughals.) However, considering that Gian Singh was a Nirmala intellectual, this particular story should be viewed with caution, as it could merely be an attempt to tie criticism of Dasam Granth to heretical sects, and therefore to heresy and blasphemy.

== Etymology ==
The name Dasam Granth means "book of the tenth [guru]". Another theory is that the name refers to the work being a tenth of what is remaining of what was originally a much larger collection.

== History ==
Kamalroop Singh Birk argues that the Dasam Granth was compiled in the court of Guru Gobind Singh, rather than being compiled by Bhai Mani Singh after the guru's death. According to Jagtar Singh Grewal, based upon internal evidence and Sikh accounts, the constituent works of the composition were authored at the following dates:

- Jaap Sahib and Akal Ustat in 1677
- Krishan Avtar, began at Makhowal in 1684 and completed at Paonta in 1688
- Charitro Pakhyan, began in 1691 and finished in 1696
- Bachittar Natak, completed in 1698
- Ram Avtar, completed in 1698

There are some manuscripts of the work dating to the late 17th century, such as the Anandpuri Bir, dating to 1696. Many works were lost during the 1704 evacuation of Anandpur Sahib. In the following decades, the corpus of texts were recollected by three persons: Mani Singh, Deep Singh, and Sukha Singh of Patna. These independent collections are mostly the same content, with minor variations/differences. During the Singh Sabha movement, the Tat Khalsa rejected the text as it did not align with their conceptualization of Sikhism. Meanwhile, the Sanatan Sikhs of the Amritsar Singh Sabha were in favour of the work, formulating a committee in 1885 to create a standardised version of it. In 1897, the scripture was standardized and printed, with the apocrypha works found in historical manuscripts being left-out of the printed, standardized version. The Amritsar Singh Sabha committee published their canonical print of the scripture in 1902 under the title Dasam Granth. The modern printed text is 1,428 pages in-length.

== Compilation ==
=== Timeline ===
Name of Composition	Written at	Verses	Timeline
Jaap Sahib	Paunta Sahib	199
Akal Ustat	Paunta Sahib	271.5
Bachitar Natak	Paunta Sahib	471
Chandi Charitar Ukati Bilas	Paunta Sahib	233
Chandi Charitar II	Paunta Sahib	266
Chandi di Var	Paunta Sahib	55
Chaubis Avtar	Paunta Sahib, Anandpur Sahib	5571
Brahma Avtar	Paunta Sahib	348
Rudra Avtar	Paunta Sahib, Anandpur Sahib	855
Shabad Patshahi 10	Anandpur Sahib, Machiwara	10
33 Sawaiyey	Anandpur Sahib	33
Khalsa Mahima	Kapal Mochan	4
Gyan Parbodh	Anandpur Sahib	336
Shastar Nam Mala Purana	Paunta Sahib	1317
Ath Pakhyan Chairtar Likhyate	Paunta Sahib, Anandpur Sahib	7569
Zafarnama	Dina Kangar	868

=== History of scripture's name ===
Guru Gobind Singh wrote various booklets and had a title on each of them. As per internal references, the scripture comprises the following major booklets:

1. Bachitar Natak Granth
2. Shastarnam Mala Purana
3. Charitropakhyan Granth
4. Gyan Prabodh Granth
5. Zafarnama/Jangnamah

According to early Sikh historical resources, the scripture was not named as Dasam Granth and each composition within this scripture are named separately by various authors like:

- Bhai Koer Singh states Pratham Pehar Satgur Aise, Krishna Charitar Gavat hai Jaise
- Bava Sewa Dass states Keteyan Rubaiyan likhiyan keteyan badhshahaan ki sakhiyan likhiyan, aur apni haqiqat bhi likhi

Later, In Bansavali Nama Patshahi 10, Kesar Singh Chibber named this granth as Chota Granth (The Small Granth).

In 1812, JB Malcolm called this scripture as Dasvein padhshsh da granth (The Scripture of 10th Ruler).

Later, Khalsa accepted the name Dasam Granth, for the reason that it contains compositions of 10th Guru of Sikhs.

== Resources and references ==
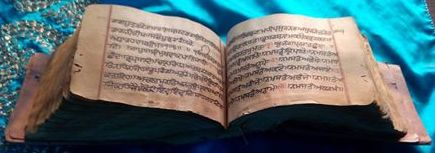
18th century Sikh manuscript which combines the Guru Granth Sahib and Dasam Granth together into a single volume

Following are early Sikh references of historical books and manuscripts mentioning different compositions and poetry from Dasam Granth:

=== 17th century resources ===
==== Sri Gur Katha, Bhai Jaita ====
Sri Gur Katha is work of Bhai Jiwan Singh, composed in the last decade of the seventeenth century, does not mention about Dasam Granth but does mention Chopai (Charitar 404), Savaiyey (Akal Ustat) and Jaap Sahib recitation during creation of Khalsa Panth.

The Anandpur Marco Bir (Not to be confused with the Anandpur Hazuri Bir, written by Bhai Mani Singh) is said to have been written by Guru Gobind Singh himself, as evidenced by the distinct calligraphy. The bir (copy of the scripture) is commonly mistaken as a Dasam Granth manuscript, but is in fact an Adi Granth manuscript.

There are at least 4 manuscripts of the Dasam Granth from the late 1690s.

- Anandpuri Birh (1696) - This manuscript was created in the court of Guru Gobind Singh. It contains three primary sections, and was written by multiple scribes. The guru also left various footnotes, and 8 folios of handwritten bani from Guru Gobind Singh can be found in this manuscript. The Zafarnama was later appended to the Manuscript.
- Patna Birh #1 (1698) - This manuscript contains various apocryphal compositions. The Zafarnama and Hikayats were later added at the end of the manuscript.
- Patna Birh #2 (1698) - This manuscript also contains various apocryphal compositions, and is inlaid with gold.
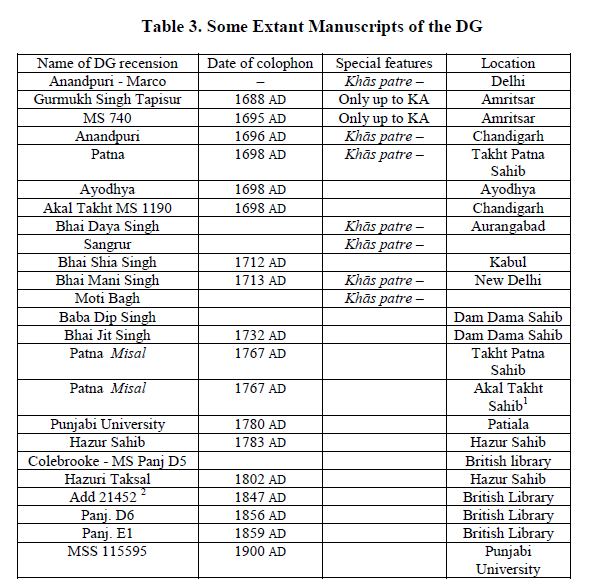
- Chart documenting various manuscripts of the Dasam Granth
  Akal Takht Birh (1698) - This manuscript is visually very similar to the Patna Birh #1. It was written with the Hikayats, and the Zafarnama was later added in. This challenged the notion that the Hikayats were written in the 1700s with the Zafarnama. Kamalroop Singh concludes that the Hikayats were written in Paonta Sahib.
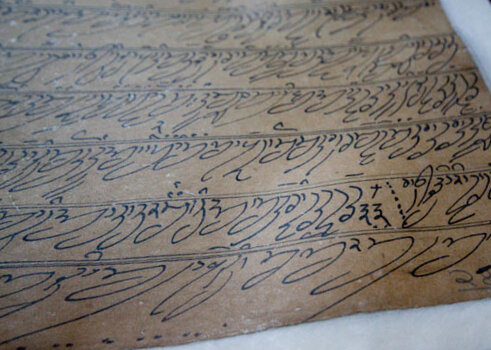
Various pages from the Anandpuri Marco Bir of the Adi Granth #1

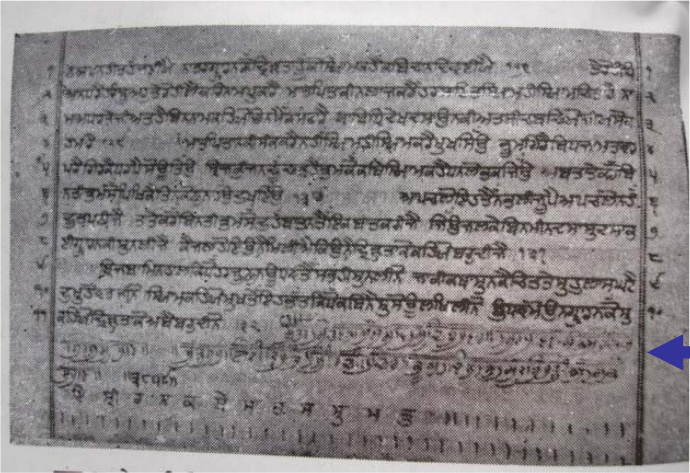
'Khas Patra' (important page) containing a correction authored by Guru Gobind Singh from the 'Anandpuri Hazuri bir' (manuscript) of the Dasam Granth

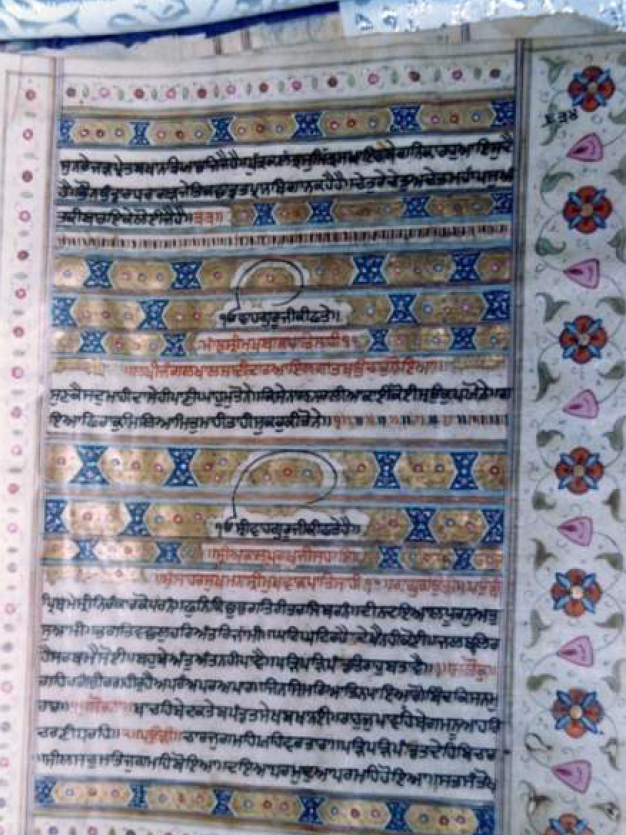
The apocryphal "Sahansar Sukhmana" in a manuscript of the Dasam Granth in Patna, allegedly from 1698 CE

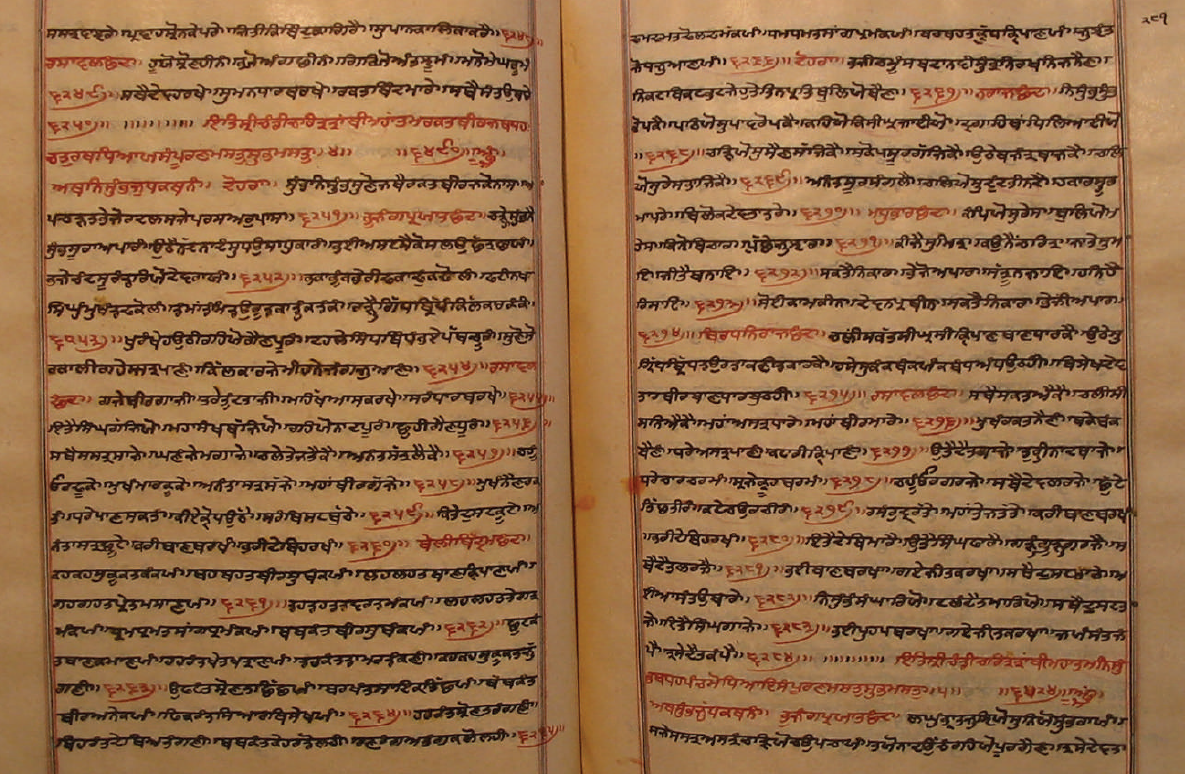
Chandi Charitar II in the 1698 CE Patna Manuscript of the Dasam Granth

=== 18th century resources ===
==== Rehitnama, Bhai Prehlad Singh ====
This booklet contains short poem having 38 couplets written by Bhai Prehlad Singh in the early 18th century, whose hymn, Sab Sikhan ko Hukam hai Guru Maneyo Granth, is heavily quoted among Sikhs. This Rahitnama mentioned first composition of Dasam Granth i.e. Jaap Sahib, a Sikh liturgy. Following is a quote from the same:
ਬਿਨਾ 'ਜਪੁ' 'ਜਾਪੁ' ਜਪੇ, ਜੋ ਜੇਵਹਿ ਪਰਸਾਦਿ ||
One who is spending life(doing religious activities) without Understanding of Japuji Sahib and Jaap Sahib,
ਸੋ ਬਿਸਟਾ ਕਾ ਕਿਰਮ ਹੂਇ, ਜਨਮ ਗਵਾਵੈ ਬਾਦ ||
he is living insect of excreta and will lose this birth.

==== Rehatnama Hazuri, Bhai Chaupa Singh ====
This Rehitnama is the most elaborate statement of rules of conduct for the Sikhs which is traditionally ascribed to Bhai Chaupa Singh Chhibbar concluded AD 1702–1706. This rehitnama states various lines from different Banis of Dasam Granth.

==== Sri Gur Sobha, Poet Senapati ====
This historical book was completed by Senapati, The court poet of Guru Gobind Singh, after his demise in 1711. The source does not mention about Dasam Granth as Granth was compiled later to this source by Mani Singh. Though, this source mentioned the content of Bachitar Natak and Kalki Avtar.

The main topic is stated with the Akal Purkh's declaration of the purpose for which Guru Gobind Singh was deputed to take birth in this world. This is reminiscent of ‘Akal Purkh’s Bach’ of Bachittar Natak. The book ends with the poet's wishful thinking that the Master will come again to Anandgarh to redeem the world by defeating the evil forces and protecting and caring for the holy persons. This is on similar lines as Nihkalank Kalki Avtar described in Dasam Granth which indicates the presence of Bachitar Natak during that period. This book is written not only in the style and language of the Sri Dasam Granth but some verses are similar to the verses found in Sri Bachitra Natak, most notably the battles of Guru Gobind Singh.

==== Letter to Mata Sundri, Bhai Mani Singh ====
The letter is claimed to have been written by Bhai Mani Singh to Mata Sundari in 1716, after 8 years of demise of Guru Gobind Singh. This manuscript provides evidence of existence of 303 Charitars, Shastar Nam Mala and Krishna Avtar compositions. Among critics Gyani Harnam Singh Balabh believes that only 303 Charitars were written by Guru Gobind Singh among 404 Charitars in Charitropakhyan. The authenticity of this letter is questionable and has been suggested as being forged by many scholars.

==== Parchi Gobind Singh - Bava Sevadas ====
This manuscript was finished sometime in the first quarter of the eighteenth century(around 1741) by Seva Das, an Udasi. This book mentioned two shabads of Rama Avtar and from 33 Swaiyey. It also mentioned that Guru Gobind Singh had written Zafarnamah and stories in Hikaaitaan during his lifetime. This serves as evidence of existence of these hymns and composition during the early 18th century and its spread among scholars and common people of that period.

The source does not mention about Dasam Granth as it contains events of Guru's lifetime but it evident existence of 4 compositions in the early 18th century.

==== Gurbilas Patshahi 10, Bhai Koer Singh Kalal ====
This book mentioned about serve as evidence to Guruship to Guru Granth Sahib, written in 1751 after 43 years of Guru Gobind Singh demise also mentioned most of the compositions of Dasam Granth. Though, this book does not cover events happened after the demise of Guru in much detail.

This book confirms writing of Chobis Avtar, Jaap Sahib and Akal Ustat at Paonta, Bachitar Natak, Chandi di Var. It mentioned that Hikaaitaan was embedded at end of Zafarnama by Guru Gobind Singh and sent it to Aurangzeb.

Bansavalinama Dasan Patshahian Ka, Kesar Singh Chibbar

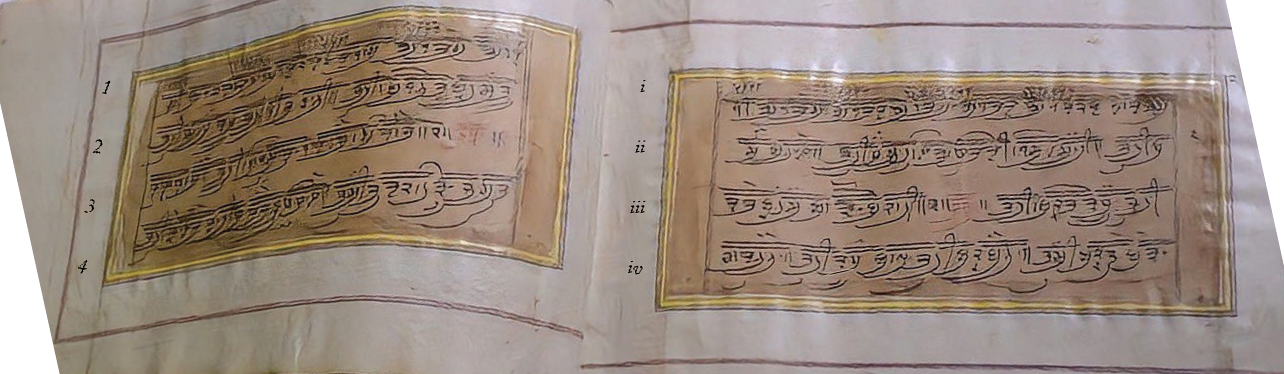
A photo of the Charitropakhyan Pothi (volume of pages) in the hand of Guru Gobind Singh from the 18th Century

Bansvalinama was written is 1769 and covers the lives of the ten Gurus as well as other famed Sikhs. Kesar Singh explains and quotes verses from the Ugardanti. According to the Bansavlinama the Sikhs requested that Guru Gobind Singh merge Dasam Granth with the Guru Granth Sahib. The Guru responded to the request by saying, “The Adi Granth is the Guru. This (Dasam Granth) is my play. They shall remain separate. In many parts Kesar Singh quotes Dasam Granth compisions such as Chabius Avtar, Bachitar Natak and Khalsa Mehima.

==== Guru Kian Sakhian, Sarup Singh Kaushish ====
Guru Kian Sakhian is a historical piece of information about lives of Sikh Gurus written by Bhatt Sarup Singh Kaushish completed in 1790 AD at Bhadson and it is mostly referred book as it contains dates and events are sketchy and brief. This book does not mention about compilation of Dasam Granth but it does refer to writings inside Dasam Granth which includes Bachitar Natak written at Anandpur, Krishna Avtar wrote at Paunta Sahib. The book mentioned various lines from 33 Sawaiyey, Shastarnam Mala and terminology used in Dasam Granth.

Manuscripts

Many manuscripts of the Dasam Granth came into being in the 1700s. This includes but is not limited to:

- Bhai Mani Singh Adi-Dasam (1713) - This manuscript also contains certain folios authored by Guru Gobind Singh.
- Patna Missal Manuscript (1765)
- Bhai Daya Singh (Attributed, early 1700s)
- Baba Deep Singh (mid to late 1700s)
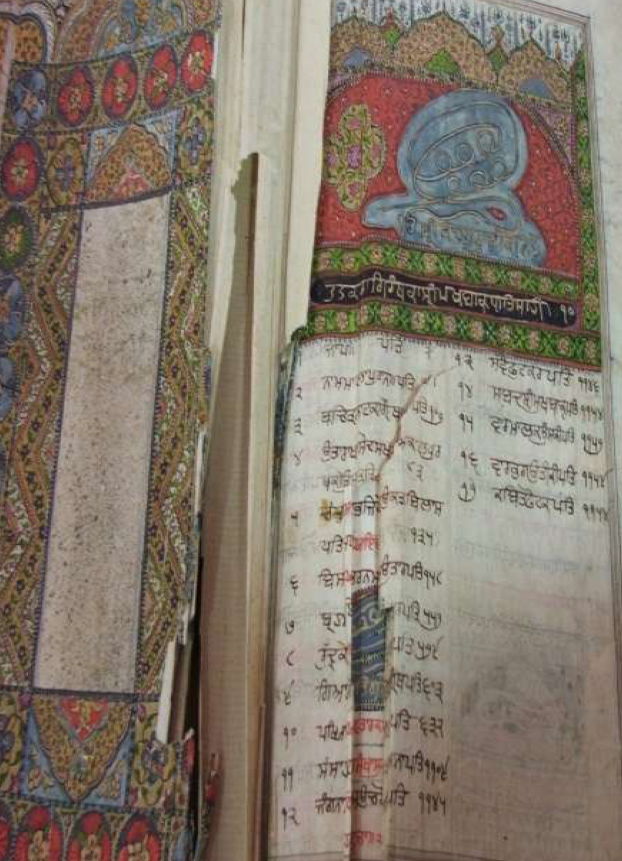
Opening folio of the Bhai Daya Singh recension of the Dasam Granth

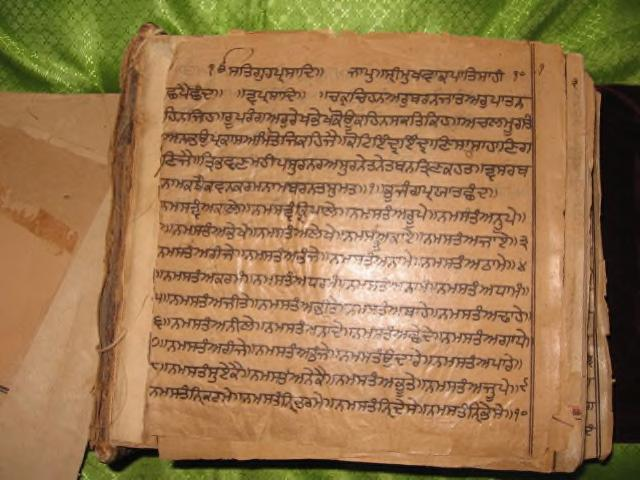
Opening folio of a Dasam Granth manuscript authored by Baba Deep Singh

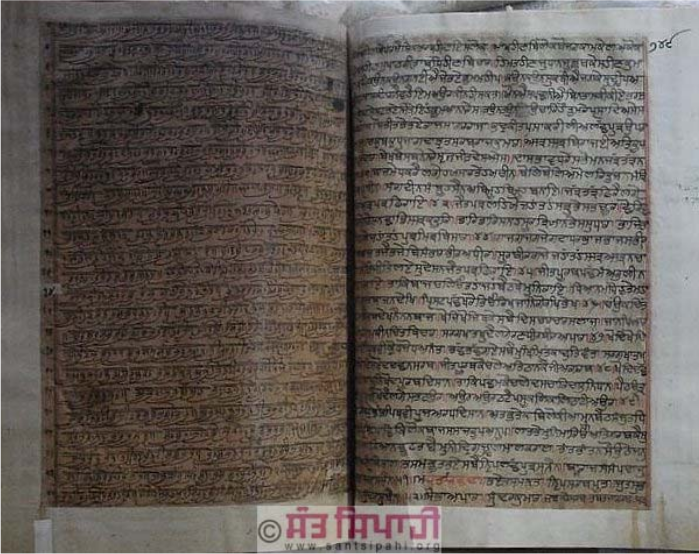
'Khas Patra' (important page) authored by Guru Gobind Singh from the 'Bhai Mani Singh Bir' (manuscript)

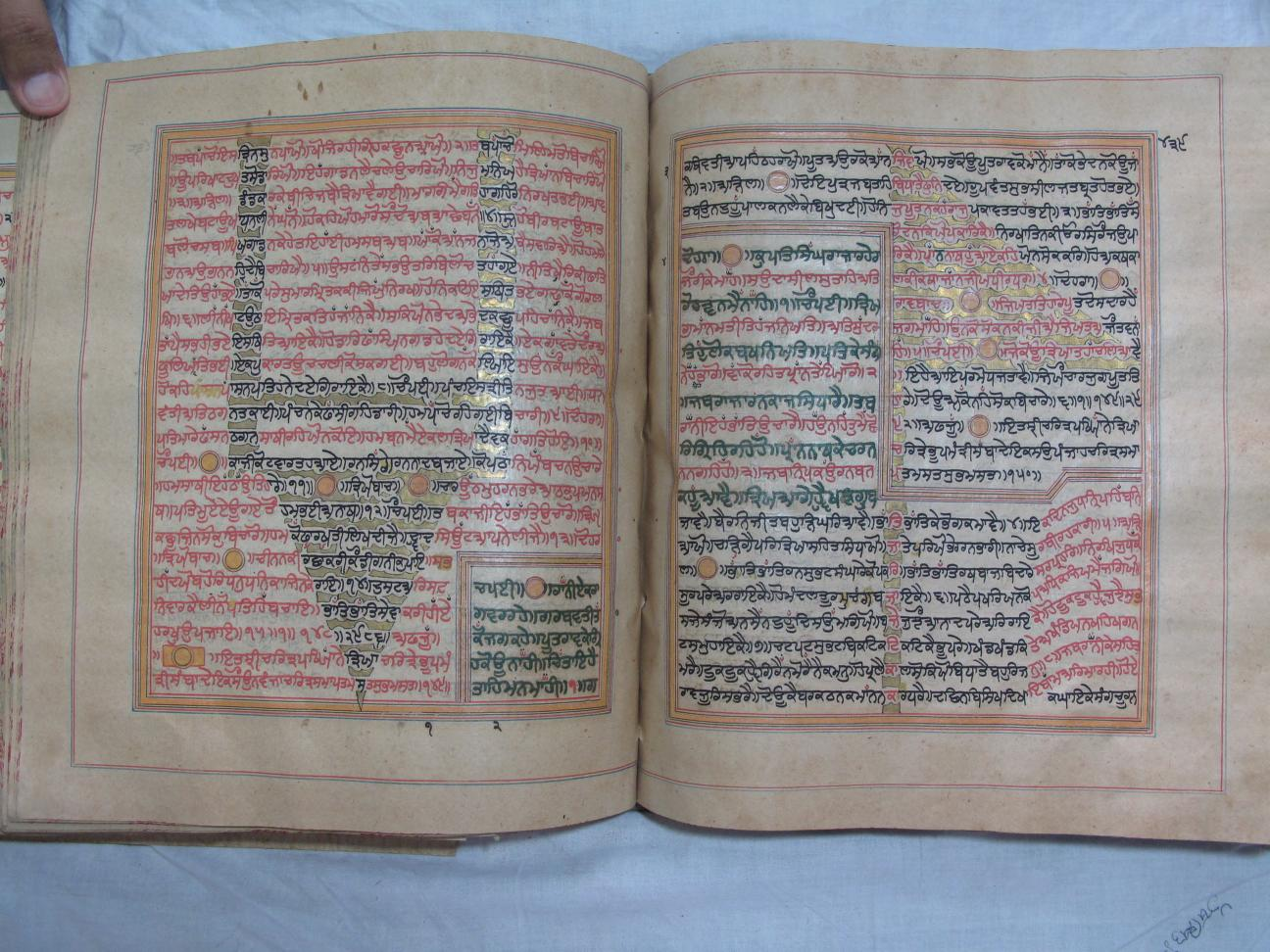
Folio of the Charitropakhyan from the Patna Missal Dasam Granth manuscript from 1765

=== 19th century resources ===
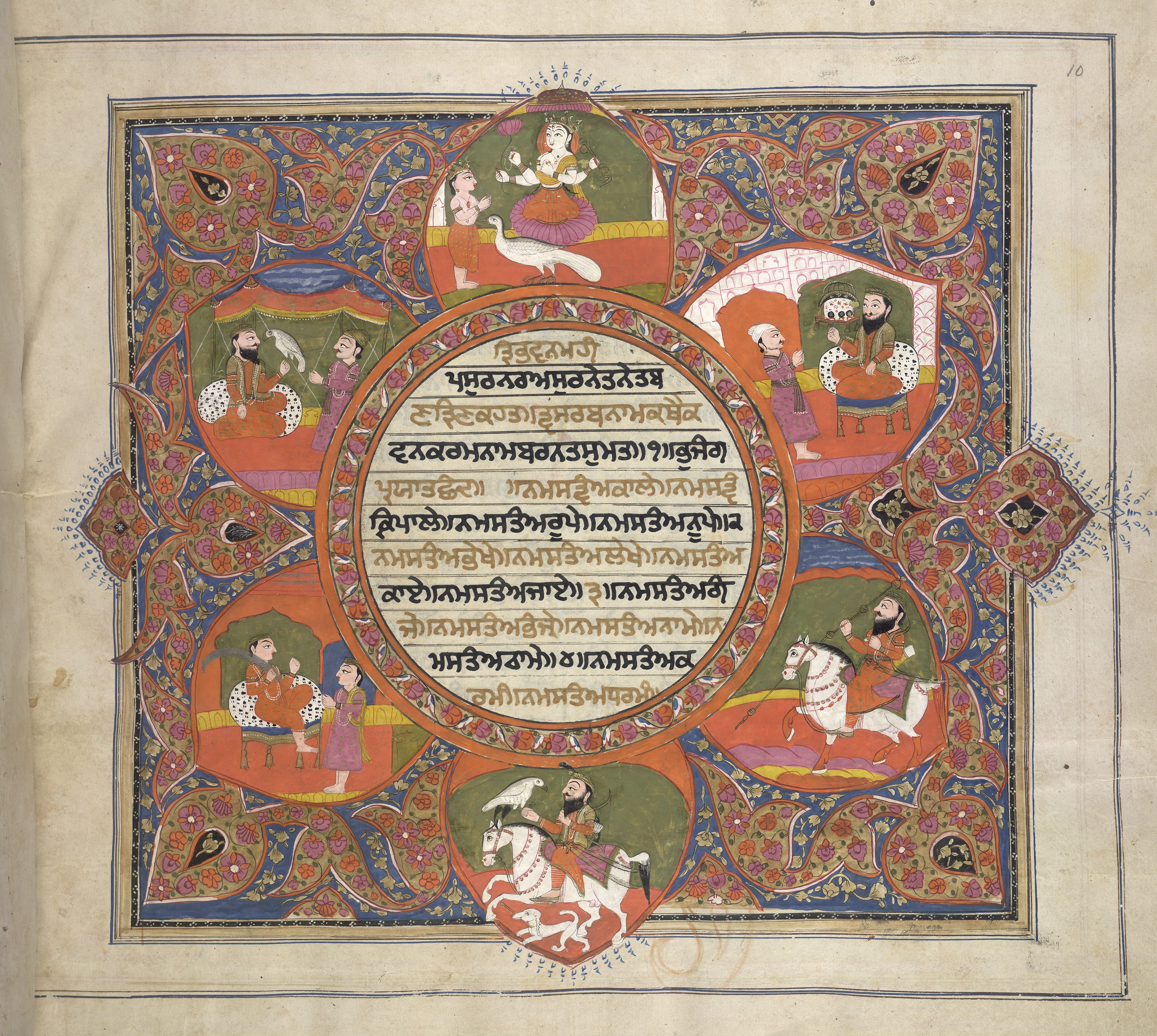
Dasam Granth frontispiece ca. 1825-1850

==== Sketch of Sikhs, JB Malcolm ====
Among several valuable works John Malcolm completed Sketch of Sikhs in 1812 and mentioned about Dasam Granth which converted many to Sikhism to fight against tyranny. Following is a quote from his book:

Guru Govind Singh, in the Vichitra Natac, a work written by himself, and inserted in the Dasani Padshah ka Granth, traces the descent of the Kshatriya tribe of Sondhi, to which he belongs, from a race of Hindu head, and throw it into the fire, he would be resuscitated to the enjoyment of the greatest glory. The Guru excused himself from trying this experiment, declaring that he was content that his descendants should enjoy the fruits of that tree which he had planted.

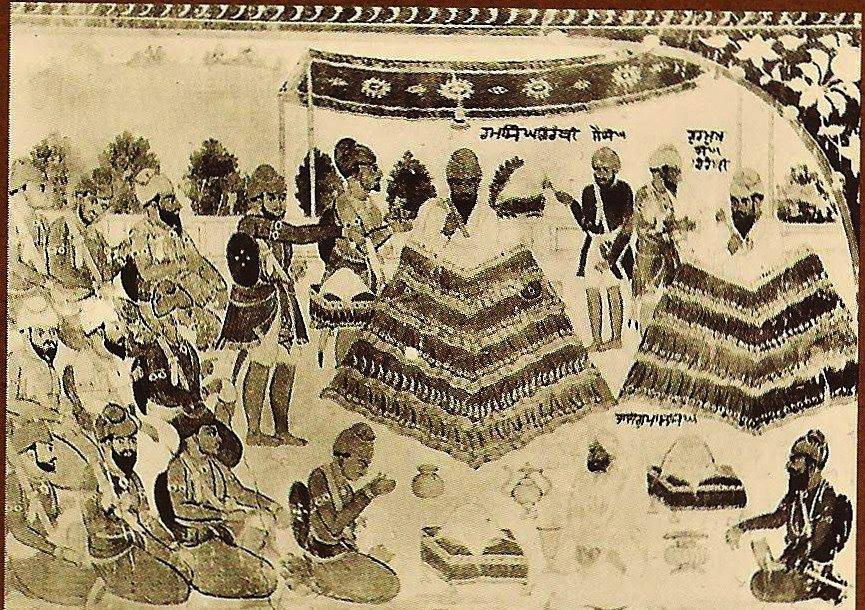
Guru Granth Sahib and Dasam Granth side-by-side. Sikh fresco artwork

==== Shaheed Bilas Bhai Mani Singh, Poet Seva Singh ====
Shaheed Bilas Bhai Mani Singh is a historical account of Bhai Mani Singh completed by Poet Seva Singh before 1846. He mentioned about writing of Krishna Avtar at Punta Sahib shown here under:
ਬਾਵਨ ਕਵੀ ਗੁਰੂ ਢਿਗ ਰਹੈ। ਮਨਿਆ ਉਨ ਮਹਿ ਗੁਨੀਆ ਅਹੈ।
ਸ੍ਰੀ ਮੁਖ ਤੋਂ ਕਲਗੀਧਰ ਆਪੈ। ਬੀਰ ਰਸ ਕੀ ਕਥਾ ਅਲਾਪੈ।
ਕ੍ਰਿਸ਼ਨ ਚਰਿਤਰ ਮਧ ਹੈ ਜਾਨੋ। ਖੜਗ ਸਿੰਘ ਕਾ ਯੁਧ ਪਛਾਨੋ।
ਜਿਸ ਤੇ ਸੁਨਤ ਕਾਇਰਤਾ ਭਾਗੈ।ਧਰਮ ਜੁਧ ਮਹਿ ਹੋਈ ਅਨੁਰਾਗੇ।
(ਚੋਪਈ 47, ਸ਼ਹੀਦ ਬਿਲਾਸ ਕਵੀ ਸੇਵਾ ਸਿੰਘ)
