= Ardās =

Prayer in Sikhism

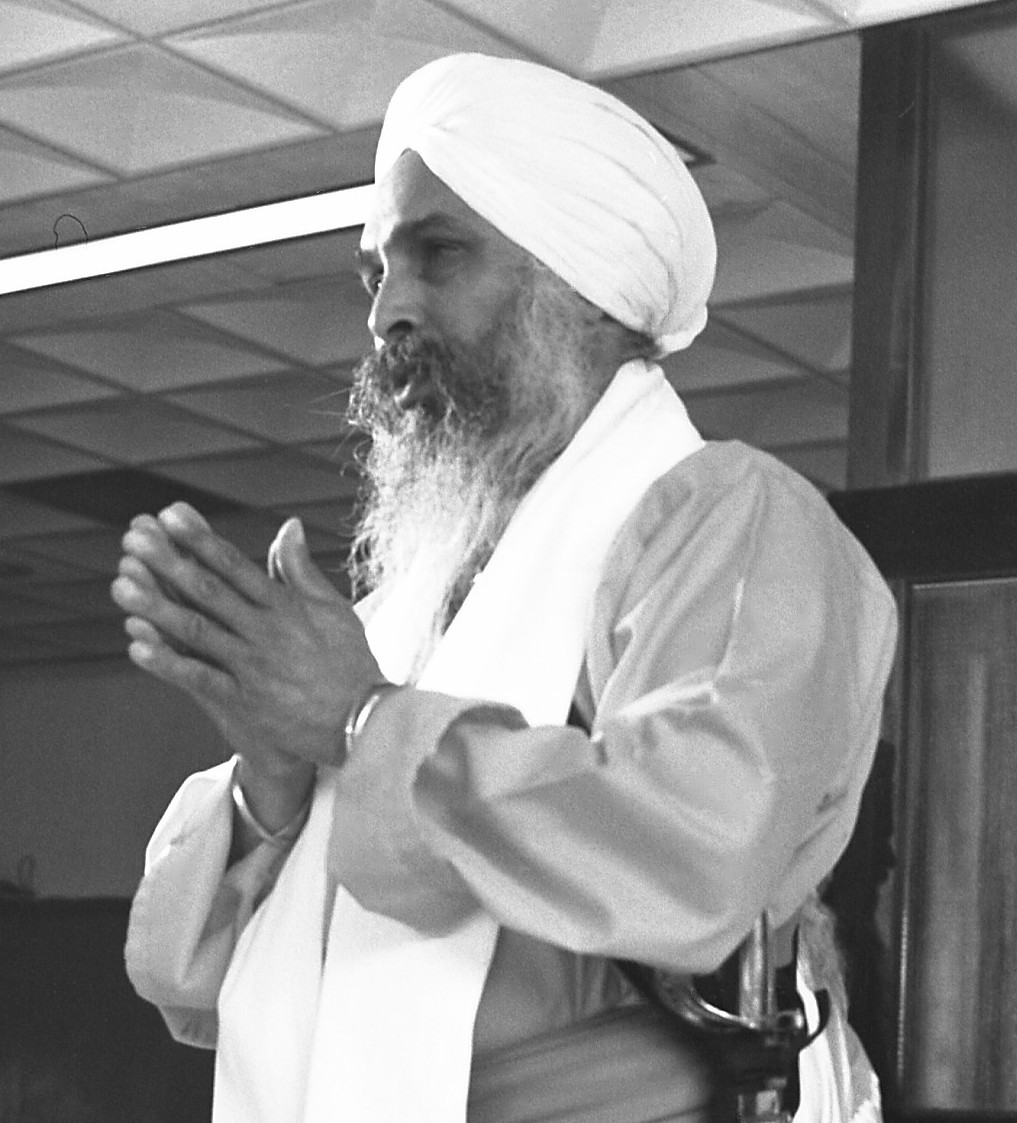
Norang Singh, current head of Guru Nanak NSJ, Handsworth, doing Ardās

The Ardās (Punjabi: ਅਰਦਾਸ, pronunciation: [ǝɾd̪äːs]) is a set prayer in Sikhism. It is a part of worship service in a Gurdwara (Sikh temple), daily rituals such as the opening the Guru Granth Sahib for prakash (morning light) or closing it for sukhasan (night bedroom) in larger Gurdwaras, closing of congregational worship in smaller Gurdwaras, rites-of-passages such as with the naming of child or the cremation of a loved one, daily prayer by devout Sikhs and any significant Sikh ceremonies.

An Ardas consists of three parts. The first part recites the virtues of the ten Gurus of Sikhism from Guru Nanak to Guru Gobind Singh, starting with lines from Chandi di Var from the Dasam Granth. The second part recites the trials and triumphs of the Khalsa and petition. The third salutes the divine name. The first and the third part are set and cannot be changed, while the second part may vary, be shortened and include a supplication such as seeking divine help or blessing in dealing with daily problems, but is usually in agreed form. While it is sung, the audience or the Sikh devotee typically stands, with folded hands, many with bowed headed, with some typically saying "Waheguru" after certain sections.

Ardas is attributed to Guru Gobind Singh, the founder of the Khalsa and the 10th Guru of Sikhism.

== Etymology ==
The Punjabi term Ardas is derived from the Persian word arzdasht which means a written "petition made by an inferior to a superior".

== Structure ==
The Ardās is usually always done standing up with folded hands and is commonly preceded by the eighth stanza of the fourth ashtapadi of the bani Sukhmani, beginning Tu Thakur Tum Peh Ardaas. It consists of three parts:

1. The beginning of the Ardās is strictly set by the tenth Sikh Guru, Guru Gobind Singh and may not be altered or omitted. It appears as the opening passage of Var Sri Bhagauti Ji Ki (see Chandi di Var). The first part is an invocation from the Chandi di Var and recites the virtues of the Sikh Gurus.
2. The second part is several paragraphs recounting Sikh symbols, places or worship and values significant and related to Khalsa. This may be changed by reciting a "short ardaas". The Sikh devotee may include a personal prayer such as "Waheguru, please bless me in the task that I am about to undertake" when starting a new task, help me with this problem, or add any personal petition for God.
3. The third salutes the divine name. This part may also not be altered or omitted.

The end of the Ardaas (Nanak Nam Chardi Kala, Tere Bhane Sarbat Da Bala, "O Nanak, may the Nam (Holy) be ever in ascendance! in Thy will may the good of all prevail!") is also set and may not be altered or omitted.

== History ==
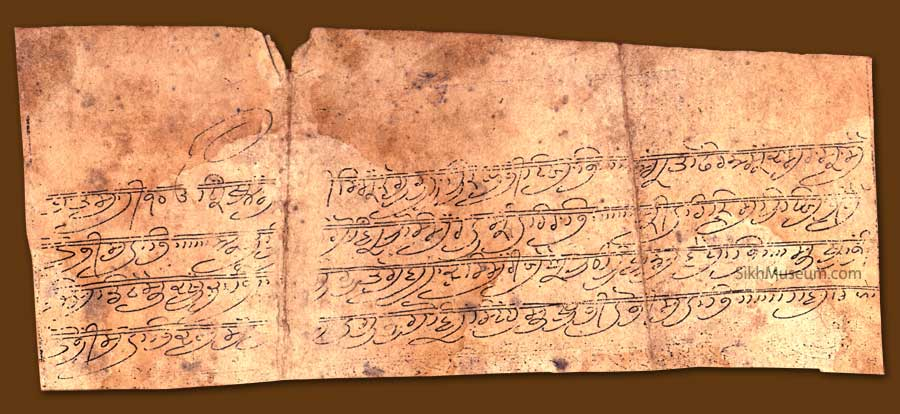
Manuscript fragment of an early version of the Sikh ardas prayer in calligraphic, scriptio continua Gurmukhi script, c. 1730s

The "Ardās" of Sikhism was first composed by Guru Gobind Singh. He fixed the first eight lines and the last section, and these are considered unalterable in Sikhism. The second section has been fluid, revised extensively and particularly by Tat Khalsa in the 20th century. The Sikh Rahit Maryada has published an approved version of the entire Ardas.

== See also ==
- Chandi di Var
- Sikh scriptures
