= Chandi Di Var =

Sikh composition from the Dasam Granth

Chandi Di Var ਚੰਡੀ ਦੀ ਵਾਰ
- Dasam Granth
- ← Chandi Charitar II Gian Prabodh →
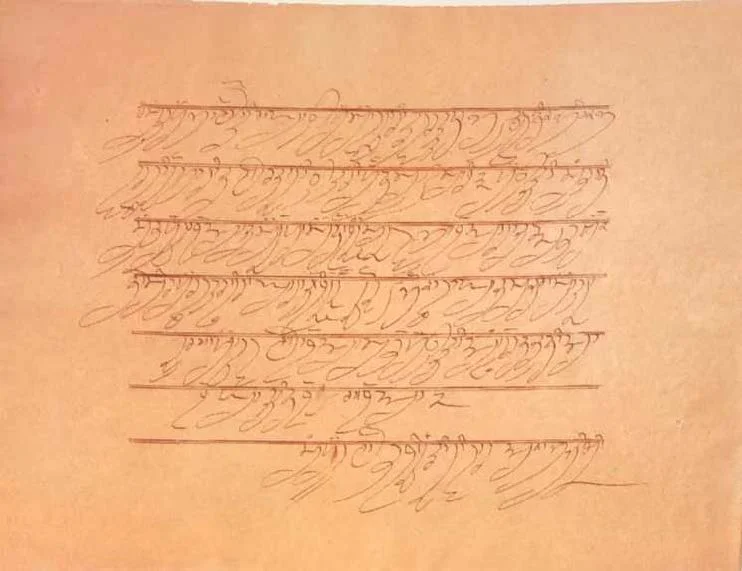
- Concluding page of Chandi Di Var, Stanza 54-55, in the hand of Guru Gobind Singh

Information
- Religion: Sikhism
- Author: Guru Gobind Singh
- Language: Punjabi language
- Verses: 55

Chandi Di Vār (Gurmukhi: ਚੰਡੀ ਦੀ ਵਾਰ, romanized: Caṇḍī Dī Vār, lit. 'Ballad of Chandi' or 'Chandi's Deeds') also known as Vaar Durga Ki is a composition written by Guru Gobind Singh, included in the 5th chapter of Dasam Granth.

== Synopsis ==
It is based on an episode from the Sanskrit work Markandeya Purana, and describes the conflict between the Gods and the Demons.

The total work is 55 cantos and is a retelling of the Durga Saptasati, much like its previous compositions. Before the Vaar, the Chandi Charitra Ukti Bilas states it is retelling the Markandeya Purana story through internal chapter references such as,

ਇਤਿ ਸ੍ਰੀ ਮਾਰਕੰਡੇ ਪੁਰਾਨੇ ਚੰਡੀ ਚਰਿਤ੍ਰ ਉਕਤਿ ਬਿਲਾਸ ਮਧਕੈਟਭ ਬਧਹਿ ਪ੍ਰਥਮ ਧਿਆਇ ॥੧॥

eit sree maaraka(n)dde puraane cha(n)ddee charitr ukat bilaas madhakaiTabh badheh pratham dhiaai ||1||

End of the First Chapter of ‘The Killing of Madhu and Kaitabh’ as described in Chandi Charitra Ukati of the Markandeya Purana.1.

The second part, known simply as Chandi Charitar II, repeats the same story in a smaller format, while part three of the text, the Chandi Di Vaar is the shortest retelling of the story.

The composition has been a significant part of Sikh culture, state Pashaura Singh and Louis Fenech, with its opening verses being part of the "frequently recited ardas prayer or petition".

In sequence, the text follows the Chandi Charitar II and is itself followed by the Gian Prabodh.

=== Language ===
The work was composed in Punjabi. It is the only oeuvre contained within the Dasam Granth composed and written in pure Punjabi, aside from the sixth hymn of Shabad Hazare P. 10 (also composed in Punjabi).

== Nomenclature ==
The text has historically been referred to by several names. These include:

- Var Durga Ki (IAST: Vāra Durgā Kī), meaning the "Ballad of Durga"
- Var Sri Bhagauti Ji Ki (Vāra Srī Bhagautī Jī Kī), meaning the "Ballad of Revered Bhagauti"
- Chandi Di Var (Chandī Dī Vāra), meaning the "Ballad of Chandi"

Var Durga Ki is the title of the work in the oldest extant manuscripts of the Dasam Granth.

== Authorship ==
According to early Sikh historians such as Bhai Koer Singh Kalal, as mentioned in Gurbilas Patshahi 10 (1751), Chandi Di Var was written by Guru Gobind Singh at Anandpur Sahib. Various other Sikh historians and scholars like Giani Ditt Singh, Professor Sahib Singh, Giani Gian Singh, Ratan Singh Bhangu, Kavi Santokh Singh also support this.

== Legacy ==
ਪ੍ਰਿਥਮ ਭਗੌਤੀ ਸਿਮਰਿ ਕੈ ਗੁਰੁ ਨਾਨਕ ਲਈਂ ਧਿਆਇ

Prathami bhagautī simar kai Gurū Nānakalaī dhiāi.

First I remember bhagauti (lit. sword, other name of goddess Durga, Durga in form of a sword), then I remember Guru Nanak.

— First line of the Chandi di Var, Guru Gobind Singh

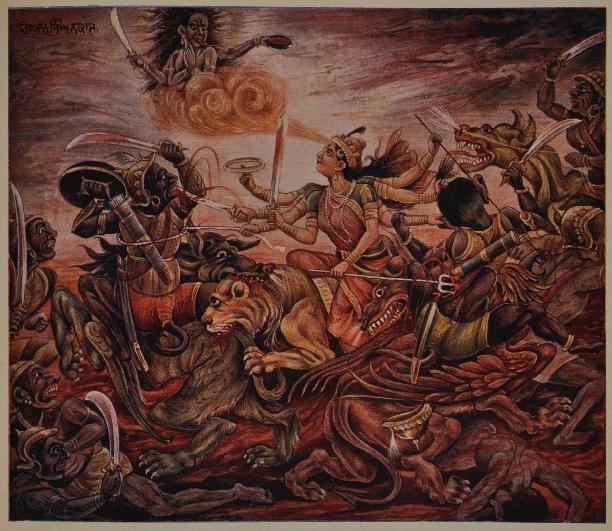
'The Eternal Strife', a striking masterpiece by Gian Singh 'Naqqash' depicting the "Nikli Matha Phore Kai" verse of the Chandi di Vār composition included in the Dasam Granth, Chandi in-battle against the Asuras

The composition has been a significant part of Sikh culture, state Pashaura Singh and Louis Fenech, with its opening verses being a part of the "frequently recited ardas prayer or petition".

=== Role in Sikh liturgy ===
The first stanza of the Sikh ardās, an invocation to God and the nine Gurus preceding Gobind Singh, is from Chandi Di Var. The first canto from Chandi Di Var is a mandatory part of an ardas that is a part of worship service in a Gurdwara (Sikh temple), daily rituals such as the opening the Guru Granth Sahib for prakash (morning light) or closing it for sukhasan (night bedroom) in larger Gurdwaras, closing of congregational worship in smaller Gurdwaras, rites-of-passages such as with the naming of child or wedding or the cremation of a Sikh, as well as daily prayer by devout Sikhs and any significant Sikh ceremonies. It remains part of the daily Nitnem of the Nihang sikhs.

== Translation ==
An English translation of the ballad, alongside an accompanying commentary and glossary, authored by Jvala Singh, is due to be fully published by Vaisakhi of 2026.

== See also ==
- Ardas
- Chandi
- Khanda
- Dasam Granth
- Sikh scriptures
