= Bachittar Natak =

Composition attributed to Guru Gobind Singh

Bachittar Natak ਬਚਿਤ੍ਰ ਨਾਟਕ
- Dasam Granth
- ← Akal Ustat Chandi Charitar Ukti Bilas →
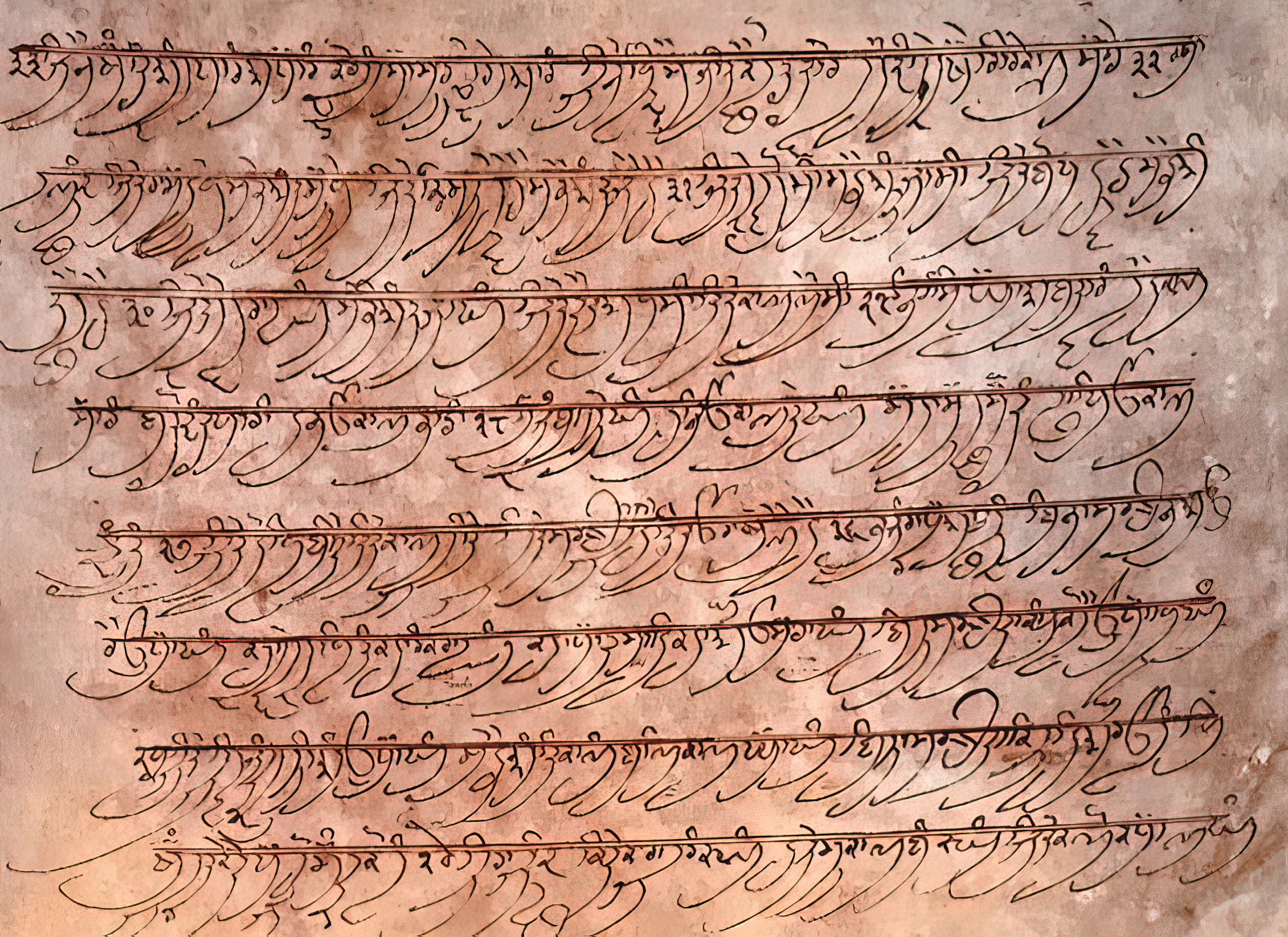
- The hymns from the first chapter of Bachitar Natak by the hand of Guru Gobind Singh

Information
- Religion: Sikhism
- Author: Guru Gobind Singh
- Language: Braj Bhasha
- Chapters: 14
- Verses: 471

The Bachittar Natak or Bachitar Natak (Gurmukhi: ਬਚਿਤ੍ਰ ਨਾਟਕ, romanized: Bachittar Natak; 'The Wonderful Play') is partly an autobiography of Guru Gobind Singh. (Note: Other spellings may exist such as Bachitra Natak.) The appellation Bachitar Natak is sometimes confusingly only applied around the Dasam Granth. The Bachitar Natak Granth, not to be confused with the Bachittar Natak composition, contains a large corpus of the Dasam Granth canon. As per the Guru Kian Sakhian, the work was completed in 1698.

== Overview ==
The Bachittar Natak is part of the Dasam Granth, the second holy scripture of Sikhism. The composition covers various aspects, including the lineage of Guru Gobind Singh, the persecution of Guru Tegh Bahadur, the author's own rebirth, and the defense and spread of dharma (righteousness). It also includes descriptions of battles, hunting expeditions, and journeys in Punjab and the Himalayan foothills. The Bachitar Natak consists of fourteen chapters, sometimes also called "Apni Katha" (meaning "my story"), which provides an autobiographical account of Guru Gobind Singh's life until the year 1696.

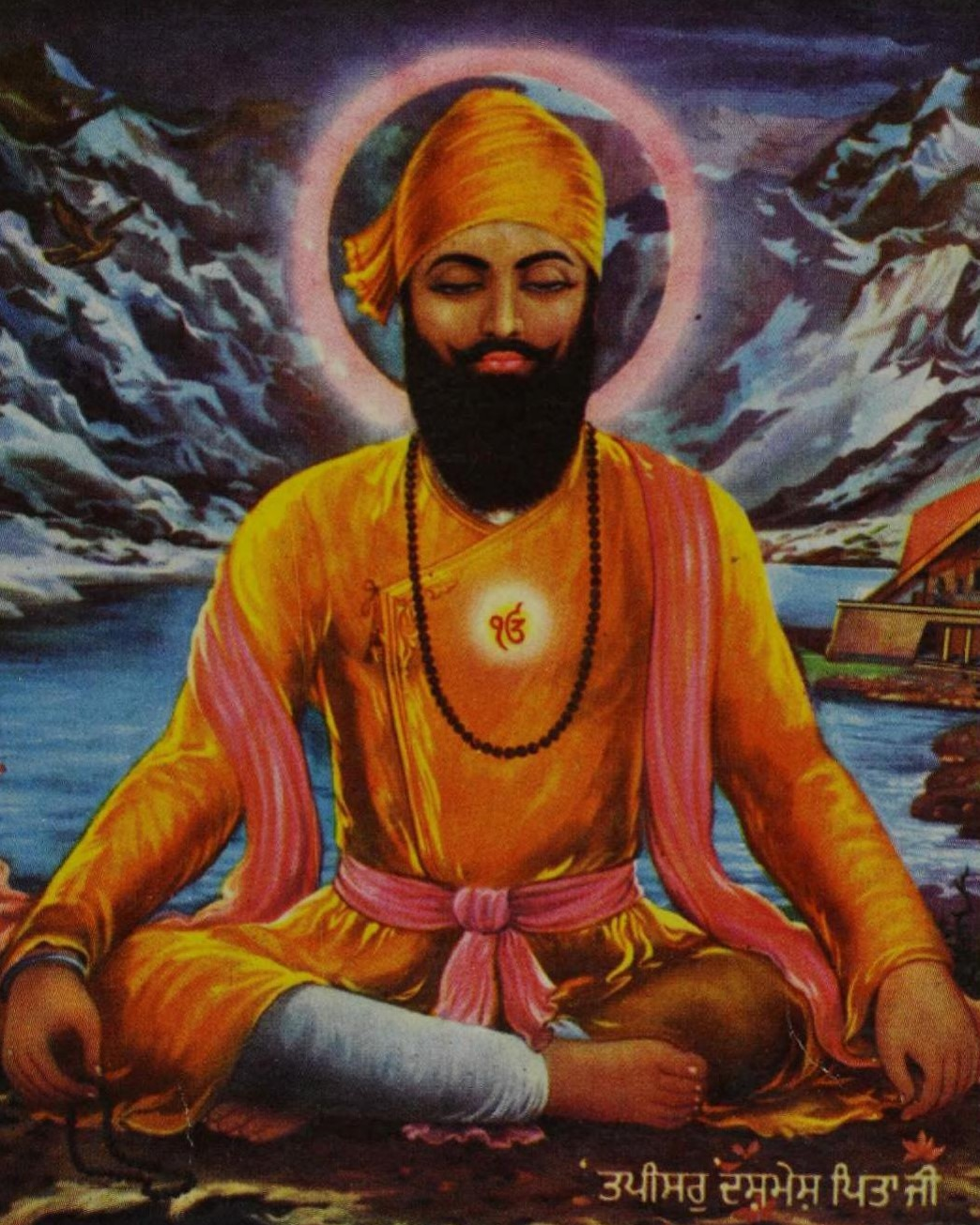
Artistic depiction of "Dusht Daman", the previous incarnation of Guru Gobind Singh as narrated in the "Bachittar Natak"

== Synopsis ==
The Bachitar Natak is partly an autobiography of Guru Gobind Singh, the tenth Sikh Guru, in which he narrates the events and circumstances of the first 35 years of his life. It outlines the history and challenges faced by the Sikh community during that time. It states the author was meditating in the Himalayan foothills on a 7-peaked mountain before being called to take birth. This previous incarnation of Guru Gobind Singh is known as Dusht Daman.

The Bani (composition) starts with a praise of the Akal Purakh (the ultimate being) and then provides a genealogy of the Bedis and Sodhis, tracing their lineage back to Lava and Kush. It also includes the author's own biography and discusses significant events such as the Battle of Bhangani, the Battle of Nadaun, the "Husaini Battle", and the arrival of Prince Mu'azzam in Punjab. The composition concludes around 1696 CE.

The Bachitar Natak contains 14 chapters.

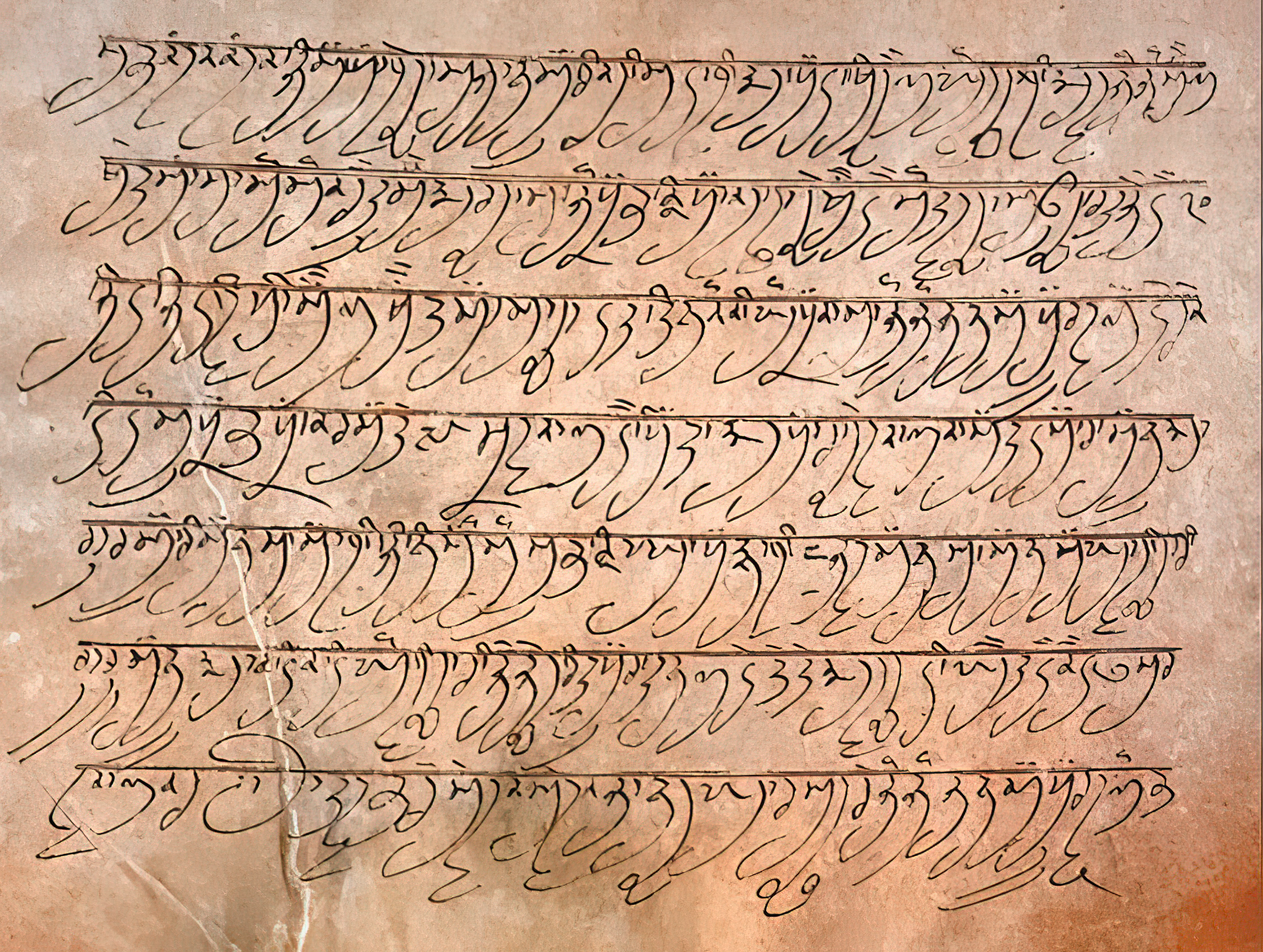
Chapter 14, the last chapter of the Bachitar Natak by Guru Gobind Singh

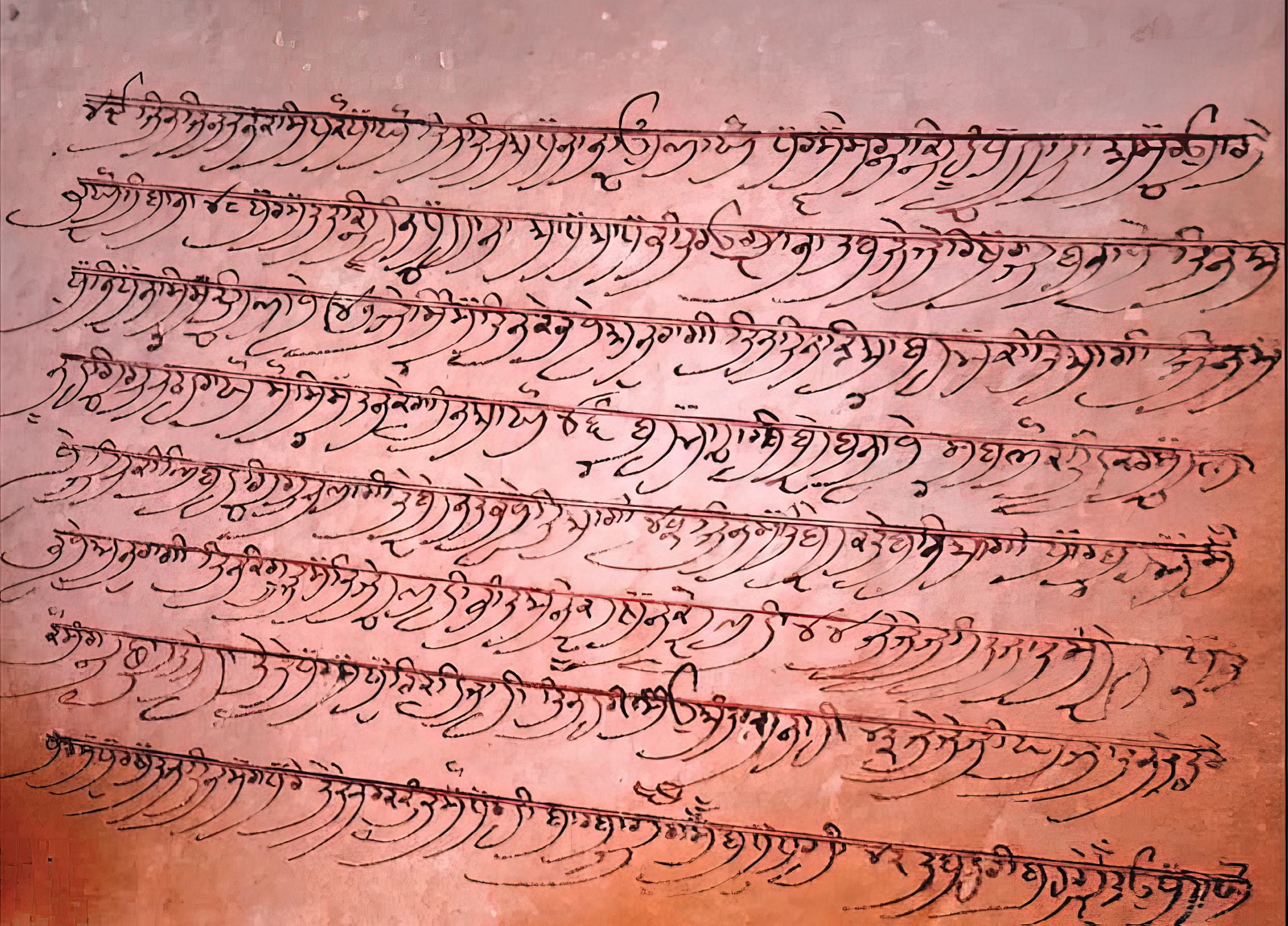
'Akaal Purakh Bach' section of the Bachitar Natak written by Guru Gobind Singh

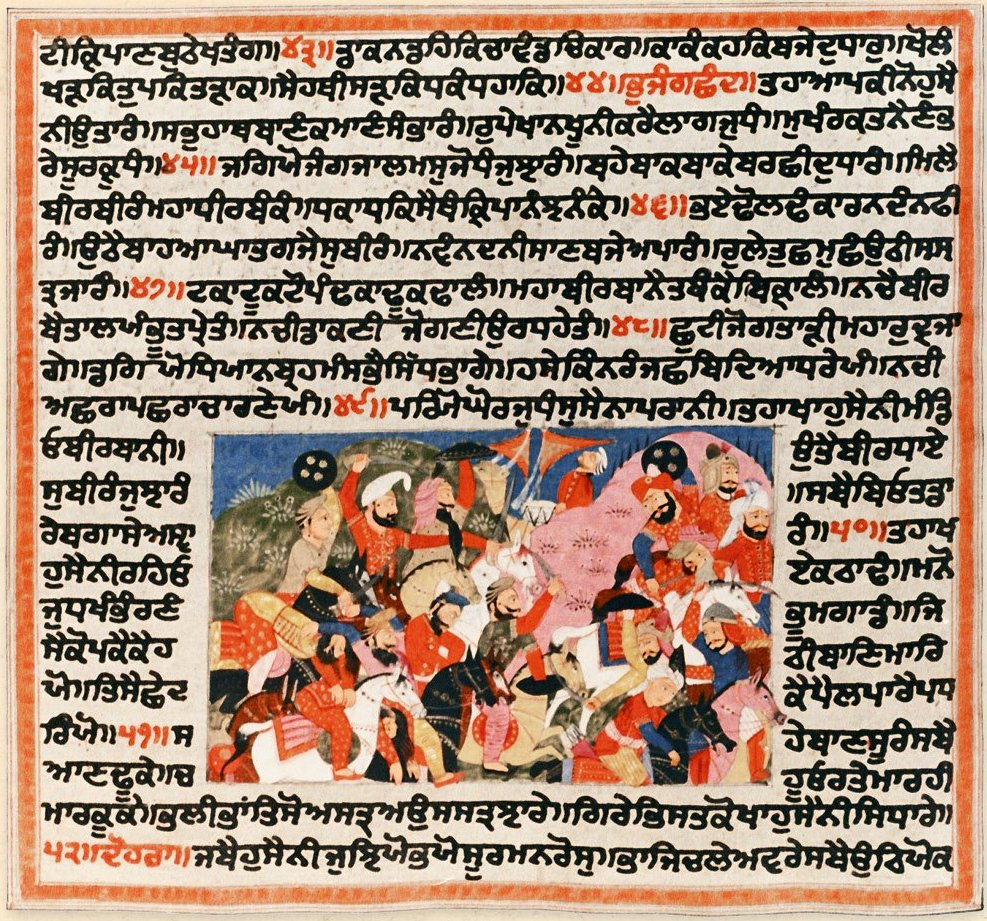
Illustrated folio of the Battle of Nadaun or "Husseni Yudh" mentioned in the last few chapters of the Bachittar Natak, ca.1870

== Historiography ==
Historical sources from the 18th century, such as Gur Sobha Granth, Gurbilas Patshai Dasvin, Bansavlinama Dasan Patshahian Ka, and Rahitnamas, mention the compositions of the Dasam Granth, including the Bachitra Natak. These sources attribute the writings to Guru Gobind Singh.

== Bachitra Natak Granth ==
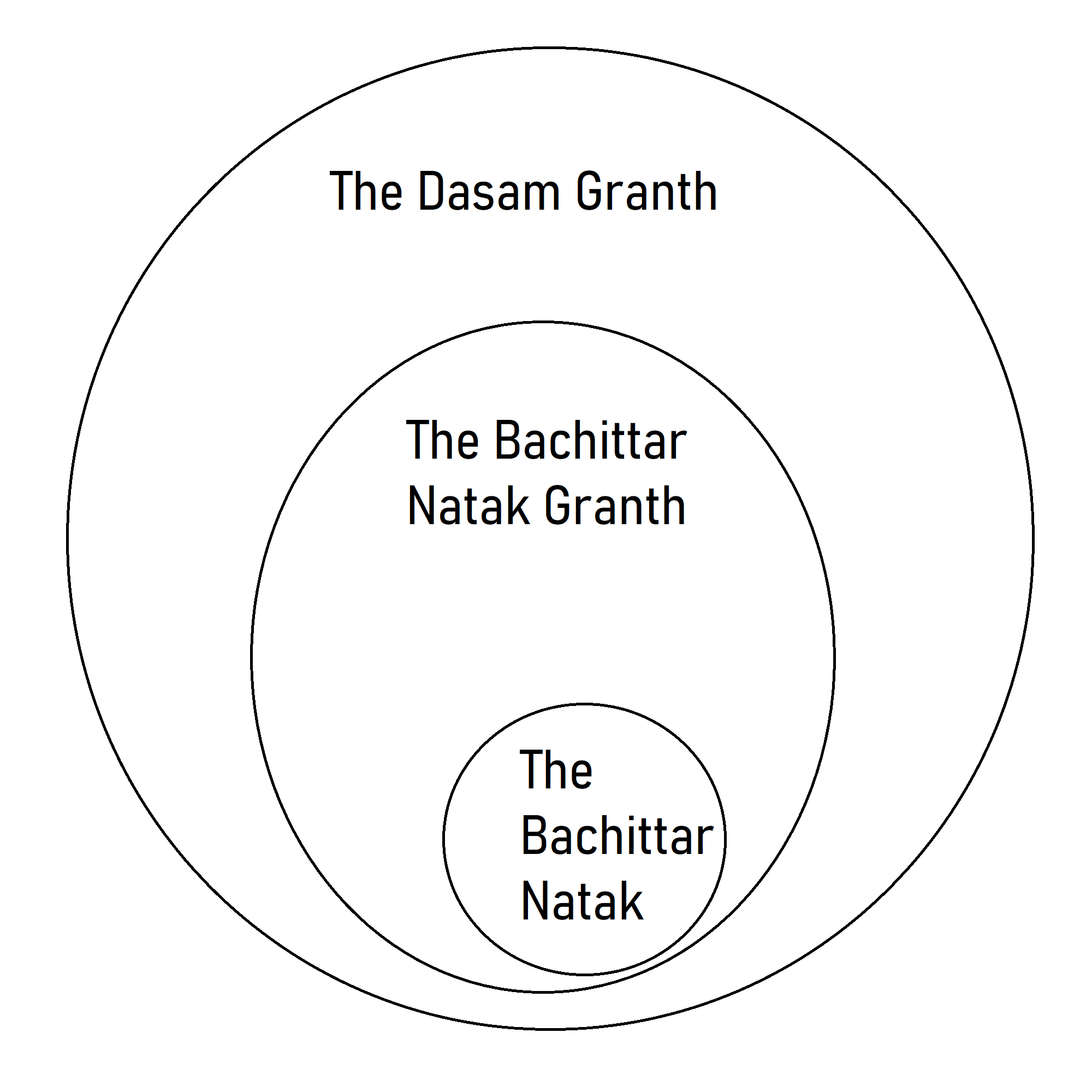
Diagram showing the relationship between the "Dasam Granth", "Bachittar Natak Granth", and "Bachittar Natak" composition

The Bachitra Natak Granth refers to a large corpus of compositions within the Dasam Granth, the compositions referenced as part of the Bachitra Natak Granth include:

1. Apni Katha (the Bachittar Natak proper)

2. Chandi Charitra I

3. Chandi Charitra II

4. Chaubis Avatar

5. Brahma Avatar

6. Rudra Avatar

These compositions follow a specific pattern, with Apni Katha discussing various avatars and their reinterpretation in line with Sikh thought and philosophy.

The Bachitra Natak Granth is a part of the Dasam Granth, but the Dasam Granth is not solely the Bachitra Natak Granth. The confusion arises from the fact that many compositions within the Dasam Granth mention the words "Bachitra Natak Likhyate," but there is more to the Dasam Granth than just the Bachitra Natak.
