= Dasam Granth =

Secondary scripture of Sikhism

Dasam Granth ਦਸਮ ਗ੍ਰੰਥ
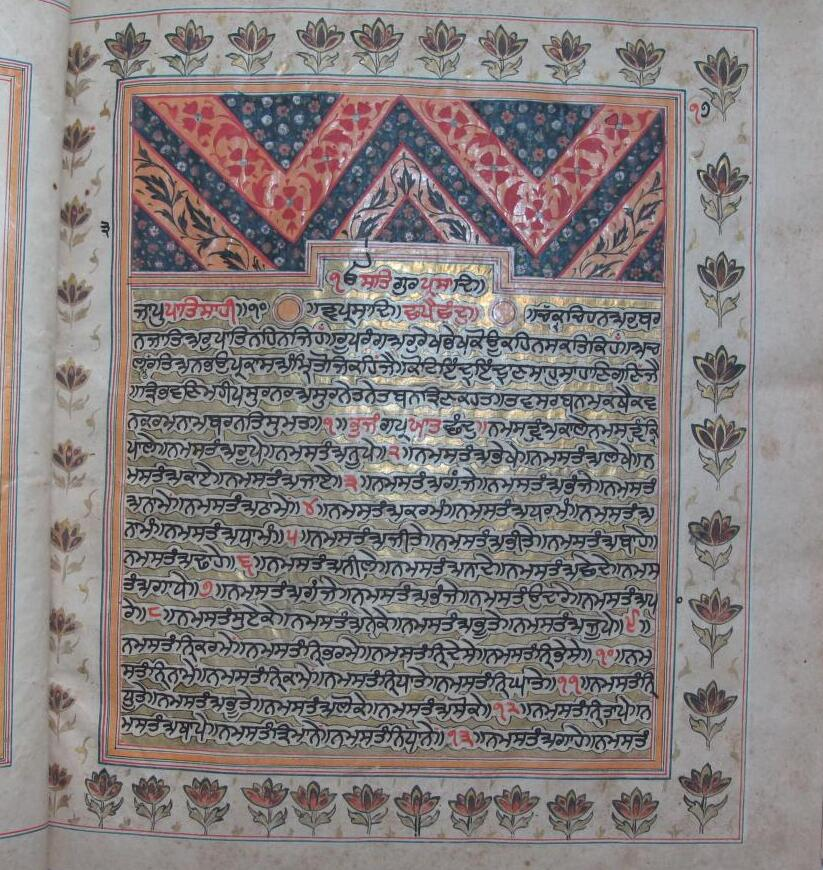
- Folio of the Jaap Sahib chapter from the 1765 Patna Missal manuscript of the Dasam Granth

Information
- Religion: Sikhism
- Author: Guru Gobind Singh
- Language: Sant Bhasha (specifically predominantly Braj, with influences of Awadhi, Punjabi, Kauravi, Arabic, and Persian)

The Dasam Granth (Gurmukhi: ਦਸਮ ਗ੍ਰੰਥ dasama gratha) is a collection of various poetic compositions attributed to Guru Gobind Singh. It is differentiated from the Guru Granth Sahib due to its focus on martial themes and imagery, such as warfare, weaponry, and other warrior-matters, known collectively as bir ras (heroic strain of expression), as opposed to the Guru Granth Sahib's shanti ras (verses that inspire peace). According to Kamalroop Singh and Gurinder Singh Mann, the text was composed to prepare the Sikhs for warfare against their Mughal enemy.

The text previously enjoyed an equal status with the Adi Granth, or Guru Granth Sahib, in the eighteenth and nineteenth centuries, and was installed side by side on the same platform. The Dasam Granth lost favor during the colonial period when reformist Singh Sabha Movement scholars could not contextualise the reworkings of Puranic stories, or the vast collection of 'Tales of Deceit' Sri Charitropakhyan. A section of Sikhs oppose the scripture and question its authenticity based upon its authorship.

The standard edition of the text contains 1,428 pages with 17,293 verses in 18 sections. These are set in the form of hymns and poems mostly in the Braj language (Old Western Hindi), with some parts in Avadhi, Punjabi, Hindi and Persian. The script is written almost entirely in Gurmukhi, except for the Guru Gobind Singh's letters to Aurangzeb—Zafarnama and the Hikaaitaan—written in the Persian alphabet.

The Dasam Granth contains hymns, from Hindu texts, which are a retelling of the feminine in the form of goddess Durga, an autobiography, letter to the Mughal emperor Aurangzeb, as well as reverential discussion of warriors and theology. The scripture was recited in full within Nirmala Sikhs in the contemporary era. Parts of it are retold from Hindu Puranas, for the benefit of the common man, who had no access to Hindu texts of the time. Compositions of the Dasam Granth include Jaap Sahib, Tav-Prasad Savaiye and Kabiyo Baach Benti Chaupai which are part of the Nitnem or daily prayers and also part of the Amrit Sanchar or initiation ceremony of Khalsa Sikhs.

Zafarnama and Hikayats in a different style and format appended to it in the mid 18th century. Other manuscripts are said to include the Patna Birs and the Mani Singh Vali Bir all originated in mid to late 18th century. One of the 1698 CE Patna Manuscripts includes various apocryphal writings such as the Ugradanti and Bhagauti Astotar.

== History ==
=== Authorship ===
Although the compositions of the Dasam Granth are traditionally accepted to be written by Guru Gobind Singh, there have been questions of the authenticity of the entirety of Dasam Granth from time of compilation. There are three major views on the authorship of the Dasam Granth:

1. The traditional view is that the entire work was composed by Guru Gobind Singh himself.
2. The entire collection was compiled by the poets in the Guru's entourage.
3. Only a part of the work was composed by the Guru, while the rest was composed by the other poets.

In his religious court at Paonta and Anandpur, Guru Gobind Singh had employed 52 poets, who translated several classical texts into Braj Bhasha. Most of the writing compiled at Anandpur was lost while the Guru's camp was crossing the Sirsa river before the Battle of Chamkaur in 1704. There were copiers available at the Guru's place who made several copies of the writings, and other writings may have been included too which may have led to authenticity issues. There is a theory that later, Bhai Mani Singh compiled all the available works under the title Dasam Granth.

Traditionalist scholars claim that all the works in Dasam Granth were composed by the Guru himself, often on the basis of a letter attributed to Bhai Mani Singh. The veracity of this letter has been examined by scholars and found to be unreliable. Some others dispute the claim of the authorship, saying that some of the compositions included in Dasam Granth such as Charitropakhyan are "out of tune" with other Sikh scriptures, and must have been composed by other poets. Syan (2013) notes, "Neither in colonial nor post-colonial Sikhism has the issue of the Dasam Granth authorship been satisfactorily resolved. What is germane, however, is that pre-colonial Sikh society wholeheartedly accepted the Dasam Granth as the work of Guru Gobind Singh."

=== Historical writings ===
The following are historical books after the demise of Guru Gobind Singh which mention that the compositions in the present Dasam Granth was written by Guru Gobind Singh:

- Rehitnama Bhai Nand Lal mentioned Jaap Sahib is an important Bani for a Sikh.
- Rehitnama Chaupa Singh Chibber quotes various lines from Bachitar Natak, 33 Swiayey, Chaupai Sahib, Jaap Sahib.
- In 1711, Sri Gur Sobha was written by the poet Senapat and mentioned a conversation of Guru Gobind Singh and Akal Purakh, and written three of its Adhyay on base of Bachitar Natak.
- In 1741, Parchian Srvadas Kian quoted lines from Rama Avtar, 33 Swaiyey, and mentioned Zafarnama with Hikayats.
- in 1751, Gurbilas Patshahi 10 – Koyar Singh Kalal, mentioned Guru Gobind Singh composed Bachitar Natak, Krisna Avtar, Bisan Avtar, Akal Ustat, Jaap Sahib, Zafarnama, Hikayats etc. This is first Granth mentioned Guruship of Guru Granth Shahib.
- In 1766, Kesar Singh Chibber in Bansavalinama writes that Guru Gobind Singh ordered the Guru Granth Sahib and Dasam Granth be kept separate. Kesar Singh frequently quotes Ugardanti, Bachitar Natak, Khalsa Mehima and many other compositions.
- In 1766, Sri Guru Mahima Parkash – Sarup Chand Bhalla, mentioned about various Banis of Guru Gobind Singh and compilation of Dasam Granth
- In 1790, Guru Kian Sakhian – Svarup Singh Kashish, mentioned Guru Gobind Singh composed, Bachitar Natak, Krishna Avtar, Shastarnaam Mala, 33 Swaiyey etc.
- In 1797, Gurbilas Patshahi 10 – Sukkha Singh, mentioned compositions of Guru Gobind Singh.
- In 1812, J. B. Malcolm, in Sketch of Sikhs mentioned the Dasam Granth as Bani of Guru Gobind Singh.

== Structure ==
The standard print edition of the Dasam Granth, since 1902, has 1,428 pages. However, many printed versions of the text in the contemporary era skip a major section (40%) because it is controversial.

The standard official edition contains 17,293 verses in 18 sections. These are set in the form of hymns and poems mostly in the Braj Bhasha (Old western Hindi), with some parts in Avadhi, Punjabi, Hindi, and the Persian language. The script is almost entirely the Gurmukhi script except for the letter of the Sikh Guru to Aurangzeb – Zafarnama, and the Hikayat in the Persian script.

=== Main compositions ===
The Dasam Granth has many sections covering a wide range of topics:

Compositions in Dasam Granth
No.	Bani Title	Alternate Name	Native Script	Description
1	Jaap Sahib	Gobind Jaapji	ਜਾਪੁ ਸਾਹਿਬ	A prayer of 199 verses dedicated to formless, timeless, all-pervading god.
2	Akal Ustat	Sri Akal Ji Ki Ustat	ਅਕਾਲ ਉਸਤਤਿ	A praise of the timeless primal being Akal Purakh (god), explaining that this primal being takes numerous forms of gods and goddesses, listing most frequently Hindu names of these, but also includes a few Muslim epithets. Criticises overemphasis on rituals related to the devotional worship of god.
3	Bachittar Natak	Bachitra Natak	ਬਚਿੱਤਰ ਨਾਟਕ	Partly an autobiography that states he was born in Sodhi lineage, tracing it to the lineage of Rama and Sita of Ramayana; mentions Guru Nanak was born in the Bedi clan and how the next eight Gurus came to lead the Sikhs; describes the persecution and execution of Guru Tegh Bahadar calling him the defender of dharma who protected the sacred threads and the tilaks (forehead mark of devout Hindus); he mentions his own rebirth in Patna after God explained to him that he had sent religious leaders to earth, in forms such as Muhammad but these clung to their own self-interest rather than promote devotion to the true God; He took birth to defend and spread the dharma, and was blessed by god to remember his past births; the Bachitra Natak criticises those who take pride in their religious rituals, mentions his own hunting expeditions, battles and journeys in Punjab and the Himalayan foothills. It states the author was meditating in the Himalayan foothills meditating on Mahakala and Kalaka before being called to take birth. The entire work is fourteen chapters in length, with one section named Apni Katha ("my story"), which is an autobiographical account of the tenth Guru's life up til the year 1696. The appellation Bachitar Natak is sometimes confusingly only applied to that one specific section rather than the entire fourteen chapter composition in which Apni Katha constitutes a single section of. Sometimes a huge chunk of the Dasam Granth is termed Bachitar Natak Granth, containing Chandi Charitars 1 and 2, Chaubis Avtar, Brahma Avtar, and Rudra Avtar. Most Western and Sikh scholars accept the work as a genuine composition of the tenth Guru, even deriders of the Dasam Granth.
4	Chandi Charitar Ukti Bilas	Chandi Charitar 1	ਚੰਡੀ ਚਰਿਤ੍ਰ (ੳਕਤਿ ਬਿਲਾਸ)	A discussion of the Hindu goddess, Durga in the form of Chandi; this section of the Dasam Granth declares that it is based on the Sanskrit text Markandeya Purana; it glorifies the feminine with her fighting the mythical war between good and evil, after the gods have admitted their confusion and weakness, she anticipating and thus defeating evil that misleads and morphs into different shapes.
5	Chandi Charitar II	Chandi Charitar 2 Chandi Charitar Trambi Mahatam	ਚੰਡੀ ਚਰਿਤ੍ਰ (ਭਾਗ ੨)	A retelling of the story of the Hindu goddess, Durga again in the form of Chandi; it again glorifies the feminine with her fighting the war between good and evil, and in this section she slays the buffalo-demon Mahisha, all his associates and supporters thus bringing an end to the demonic violence and war. Authorship is generally and traditionally attributed to Guru Gobind Singh. This composition was written in Braj Language at Anandpur Sahib, Punjab. It has eight cantos, contains 262 couplets and quatrains, mostly employing Bhujang prayat and Rasaval measures, divided into 8 chapters. This work was composed at Anandpur Sahib, sometime before AD 1698, the year when the Bachitar Natak was completed. According to Max Arthur Macauliffe, the language of this composition is not original Sanskrit. He believes it to be written by bards in employ of Guru Gobind Singh and translation of Durga Saptashati, but could not ascertain, whether principles of Sikhism imbibed in Chandi Charitras or flavor of Hinduism is still in it. It differs from Chandi Charitar Ukti Bilas in that it does not reference the chapters within the Markandeya Purana, but still tells the same story. The work contains 262 verses in total.
6	Chandi Di Var	Var Durga Ki	ਚੰਡੀ ਦੀ ਵਾਰ	The ballad of Hindu goddess, Durga, in Punjabi; this section of the Dasam Granth states that it is based on the Sanskrit text Durga Saptasati; The opening verses from this composition, states Robin Rinehart, have been a frequently recited ardas petition or prayer in Sikh history; it is also a source of controversy within Sikhism, as the opening verse states "First I remember Bhagauti, then I turn my attention to Guru Nanak"; the dispute has been whether one should interpret of the word "Bhagauti" as "goddess" or a metaphor for "sword".
7	Gyan Prabodh	Gyan Prabodh	ਗਿਆਨ ਪ੍ਰਬੋਧ	The section title means "the Awakening of Knowledge", and it begins with praise of God; it includes a conversation between soul and God, weaves in many references to Hindu and texts such as the Mahabharata; the section summarises those parva of the Hindu epic which discuss kingship and dharma; the role of Brahmins and Kshatriya varnas. This composition contains 336 verses in total.
8	Chaubis Avtar	Vishnu Avtar	ਚੌਬੀਸ ਅਵਤਾਰ	The Chaubis Avatar (24 avatars) section is about Vishnu's 24 avtar which include Rama, Krishna, and Buddha. It is divided into 24 sections for each of the 24 avatars.
9	Brahma Avtar	Avatars of Brahma	ਬ੍ਰਹਮਾ ਅਵਤਾਰ	Narrative on the seven incarnations of Brahma, who is already mentioned in the Chaubis Avatar section
10	Rudra Avtar	Avatars of Rudra (Shiva), Ath Rudra Avtar Kathan(n)	ਰੁਦਰ ਅਵਤਾਰ	A poem that narrates Rudra (Shiva) and his avatars, also already mentioned in the Chaubis Avatar section
11	Shabad Hazare Padishah	Sabad Patshahi 10	ਸ਼ਬਦ ਹਜ਼ਾਰੇ ਪਾਤਿਸ਼ਾਹੀ ੧੦	Thousand hymns actually contains nine hymns, each set to a raga (melody), with content similar to Chaubis Avatar section; the sixth is filled with grief and generally understood to have been composed by Guru Gobind Singh after the loss of all four sons in the wars with the Mughal Empire; this section is missing in some early manuscripts of Dasam Granth.
12	33 Savaiye	33 Savaiye	੩੩ ਸਵਈਏ	Thirty-three verses that praise a god; asserts the mystery of god who is beyond what is in the Vedas and Puranas (Hindu), beyond the one in Quran (Muslim) and famously the Bible (Christian).
13	Khalsa Mahima	Praise of Khalsa	ਖ਼ਾਲਸਾ ਮਹਿਮਾ	A short passage that explains why offerings to goddess Naina Devi by the general public are distributed to the Khalsa soldiers rather than Brahmin priests.
14	Shastar Naam Mala	Shastar Nam Mala Purana	ਸ਼ਸਤ੍ਰ ਨਾਮ ਮਾਲਾ (ਪੁਰਾਣ)	The section title means a "garland of weapon names", and it has 1,300 or 1,323 verses; it lists and exalts various weapons of violence, declaring them to be symbols of God's power, states Rinehart; it includes the names of Hindu deities and the weapon they carry in one or more of their hands, and praises their use and virtues; the list includes weapons introduced in the 17th-century such as a rifle; some of the verses are riddles about weapons.
15	Sri Charitropakhyan	Charitropakhyan, Pakhyan Charitra, Tria Charitra	ਪਖ੍ਯਾਨ ਚਰਿਤ੍ਰ, ਸ਼੍ਰੀ ਚਰਿਤ੍ਰੋਪਾਖ੍ਯਾਨ, ਤ੍ਰਿਯਾ ਚਰਿਤ੍ਰ	The largest and most controversial part of the Dasam Granth; it includes material which is not in tune with Guru Gobind Singh's writings, casting its authenticity into question. it includes 405 character features and behavioral sketches; these are largely characters of lustful women seeking extramarital sex and seducing men for love affairs without their husbands knowing; the characters delight in gambling, opium and liquor; these stories either end in illustrating human weaknesses with graphic description of sexual behavior, or illustrate a noble behavior where the seduction target refuses and asserts that "he cannot be a dharmaraja if he is unfaithful to his wife"; the section is controversial, sometimes interpreted as a didactic discussion of virtues and vices; the charitras 21 through 23 have been interpreted by some commentators as possibly relating to Guru Gobind Singh's own life where he refused a seduction attempt; the final charitra (number 405) describes the Mughals and Pathans as offsprings of demons, details many battles between gods and demons, ending with the victory of gods; the Benti Chaupai found in this last charitra is sometimes separated from its context by Sikhs and used or interpreted in other ways; Many Sikh commentators have questioned the authorship of Dasam Granth in significant part because of this section, while others state that the text must be viewed in the perspective of the traumatic period of Sikh history when Guru Gobind Singh and his soldier disciples were fighting the Mughal Empire and this section could have been useful for the moral edification of soldiers at the war front against the vice. (Note: (entertainment).) (Note: This view is supported by a remark found in Bansavalinama. This remark states that scribes offered to Guru Gobind Singh to merge Adi Granth and his compositions into one scripture. He replied that they should not do so, keep the two separate because his compositions are mostly khed (entertainment).)
16	Chaupai Sahib	Kabiyo Baach Benti, Benti Chaupai	ਕਬਿਯੋਬਾਚ ਬੇਨਤੀ ਚੌਪਈ, ਚੌਪਈ ਸਾਹਿਬ	The reflection of the poet on the 405th charitar. A part of the last charitra of the Charitropakhyan section, it is sometimes separated and used independently.
17	Zafarnama	Epistle of victory	ਜ਼ਫ਼ਰਨਾਮਾ	A letter written in 1706 by Guru Gobind Singh to Emperor Aurangzeb in Persian language; it chastises the Mughal emperor for promising a safe passage to his family but then reneging on that promise, attacking and killing his family members; In this Guru Gobind Singh talks about how if the Holy Prophet were at Chamkaur in person then Aurangzeb wouldn't have lied.
18	Hikayats	Hikaitan	ਹਿਕਾਇਤਾਂ	Usually grouped with the Zafarnama section, these are twelve tales unrelated to Zafarnama but probably linked because some versions have these in Persian language; the content of this section is closer in form and focus to the Charitropakhyan section above;

=== Other compositions ===
==== Ugardanti ====
Ugardanti (Punjabi: ਉਗ੍ਰਦੰਤੀ, pronunciation: [ʊɡɾd̪aɛt̪iː]) is a poetic composition said to be written by Guru Gobind Singh, after the creation of the Khalsa Panth at Anandpur Sahib. The composition is present in Dasam Granth Bir Patna Sahib. The bani contains information about the creation of the Khalsa Panth, the dress code of the Sikhs, and is strictly against ritualism.

Etymologically, Ugardanti is a feminine term made of two words, Ugar means Fierce and Danti means Tooth. One having Fierce Tooth, is called Ugardanti. Guru Gobind Singh Ji invokes Adi Shakti in the form of the Fierce Toothed Ugardanti, writing various attributes of Ugardanti and asking for blessings and protection for the prosperity of the new Panth which is free from hypocrisy, ritualism, casteism, human worship and worships only One Non-Dual God.

In Bansavalinama Dasan Patshahian ka (1769), the author Kesar Singh Chibbar explains and quotes a few passages from Guru Gobind Singh's Ugardanti.

In Hum Hindu Nahi(1898 ), the author Bhai Kahn Singh Nabha, believed that Ugardanti Bani was not written by Guru Gobind Singh but by Bhai Sukha Singh, a priest at Patna. However, Sukha Singh's works came into being after the Bansavalinama of Kesar Singh Chibbar.

Nihang and Namdhari Sikhs believe it to be written by Guru Gobind Singh and is part of their daily liturgy. It was and is read to inspire warriors to stand up for truth and righteousness in the face of tyranny and oppression. The Composition is divided into six verses called Chhands in which the syllables and the rhythm are arranged in a precisely controlled pattern. The Type of Chhandd used is Bhagvati Chhand.

==== Tav-Prasad Savaiye ====
Tav-Prasad Savaiye (Punjabi: ਤ੍ਵਪ੍ਰਸਾਦਿ ਸ੍ਵਯੇ, pronunciation: [t̪ʋᵊəpɾʱəsäːd̪ sʋⁱ˸je], lit. ‘exclusively you, in war song meter’) is a short composition of 10 stanzas which is part of daily liturgy among Sikhs (Nitnem). It was penned down by Guru Gobind Singh and is part of his composition Akal Ustat (The praise of God). This is an important composition which is read during Amrit Sanchar. This Bani appears in the Dasam Granth on pages 13 to 15, starting from Stanza 21 of Akal Ustat.

Tavprasad means with thy grace. This composition strongly rejects idolatry, pilgrimages, grave worshiping, samadhis of yogis and other ritualistic beliefs of Hinduism, Jainism and Islam as being of no use in attaining God if performed without the love of God and all his creation . It is included in Nitnem, the daily morning prayers of Sikhs, and recited after completing Jaap Sahib. It starts with Sravag Sudh Samuh Sidhan Ke and goes up to Koor Kriya Urjheo Sab Hi Jag. Among many famous quotes from Tav-Prasad Savaiye, "Jin Prem Kiyo Tin Hi Prabhu Paayo" is widely quoted by different scholars of different religions. In Dialogues on Universal Responsibility and Education, the Dalai Lama quoted it while giving lessons on love.

Tav-Prasad Savaiye is very important part of the Nitnem. Among other things Nitnem works as a shield for the Khalsa _{(Khalsa is a perfect human being, which is the vision of Guru Gobind Singh by the orders of Akal Purkh. Such a human is perfectly capable of defending himself and others from the attacks of enemy(both spiritual and temporal)).} Specifically Savaiye act as a shield against the attacks of Pride, Ignorance, Hatred, Hypocrisy and Delusions.

=== Apocrypha compositions ===
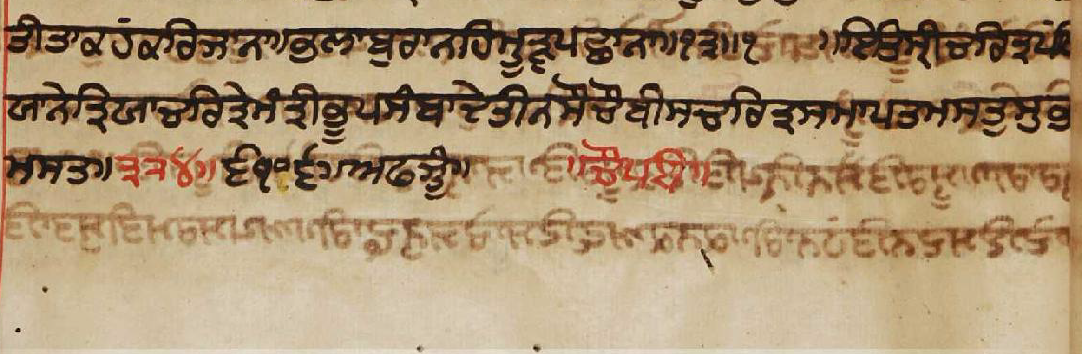
1700s Dasam Granth with Missing space after 324th Charitar

There are a plethora of writings attributed to Guru Gobind Singh that are not in the standardised Dasam Granth. These select writings are sometimes found in certain early manuscripts. These include but are not limited to:

- Asfottak Kabitt
- Sahansar Sukhmana
- Gobind Gita
- Rubai P. 10
- Uggardanti
- Raag Sorath P. 10 (Rajput Ghode)
- Raag Asa P. 10
- Fatehnama
- Indra Kavach
- Malkaus Ki Vaar
- Lakhi Jungle Khalsa (Shabad)
- Ras Mandal
- Brahm Kavach
- Var Bhagat Bhagauti
- 34th Savaiya (Additional couplet for the 33 Savaiye)
- 325th Charitar (Missing in a plethora of Dasam Granth manuscripts)
- Sri Kal Astotar
- Sikhi Rehit/Nishan E Sikhi
- Additional Hikayat found in Bhai Mani Singh Bir (1713 CE)

== Role in Sikh liturgy and access ==
A number of compositions within the Dasam Granth play a role within Sikh liturgy, which is prescribed by the Sikh Rehat Maryada:

- Jaap Sahib, part of the Nitnem, is recited by Sikhs daily in morning.
- Tav-Prasad Savaiye, again a bani of Nitnem, is part of the Akal Ustat composition, which is recited daily in the morning along with the above.
- Benti Chaupai, part of the Sri Charitropakhyan, is recited in morning and evening prayers.
- Jaap, Tav Prasad Savaiye, and Chaupai are read while preparing Khande Batey Ki Pahul for Khalsa initiation.
- The first stanza of the Sikh ardās is from Chandi di Var.
- As per the Sikh Rehat Maryada, a stanza of Chaubis Avtar, "pae gahe jab te tumre", should be comprised in So Dar Rehras.

In the Nihang tradition, the Dasam Granth is given equal scriptural status as the Adi Granth (first volume). Chandi di Var is also an important prayer among Nihang and Namdhari Sikhs.

Except for the liturgical portions and some cherrypicked verses of the Dasam Granth that are widely shared and used, few Sikhs have read the complete Dasam Granth or know its contents. Most do not have access to it in its entirety, as the generic printed or translated versions do not include all its sections and verses. In its history, the entire text was in the active possession of the Khalsa soldiers. (Note: According to Giani Gian Singh, the full copy of the Dasam Granth was in possession of the Dal Khalsa (Sikh Army), an 18th-century Sikh army, at the Battle of Kup and was lost during the Vadda Ghalughara.)

=== Opposition to the scripture ===
Opposition to the Dasam Granth arose during the colonial-period, particularly during the Singh Sabha movement. The debate regarding the scripture revolves around the nature of its authorship.

According to Kamalroop Singh, during the Akali movement in the 1920's, the Dasam Granth codex that was installed in the Akal Takht in Amritsar was attacked by reformist Sikhs allied with Teja Singh Bhasauria, who speared it and threw it out of the window of the building. Also in the 1920's, the pages of the Dasam Granth installed at Gurdwara Ramsar Sahib were desecrated using knives. Between 1920–40, many Dasam Granth manuscripts were desecrated by Sikhs who opposed the scripture. Contemporary writer Bhagat Singh blames these desecrations on so-called Ingrez Sikhs ("English Sikhs") that were influenced by the British. Kartar Singh Jhabbar took-control of the Akal Takht from its Nihang custodians in 1920, with the Dasam Granth installed there (supposedly dated to 1698) being desecrated in the process of the takeover. According to the Nihang Sikh Anup Singh, who was active during the period of the Nihang leader Sahib Singh Kaladhari, the SGPC used women to take over the Akal Takht from the Nihangs, as the Akali-Nihangs would not attack women.

Following these incidents, the SGPC stopped holding parkash (enthronement) of the scripture at Sikh gurdwaras, except on special occasions such as the Gurpurab of Guru Gobind Singh, where an akhand path of the Dasam Granth was performed. After 1947, it was no longer installed at SGPC-controlled gurdwaras even on Guru Gobind Singh's gurpurab.

== Manuscripts and printing ==
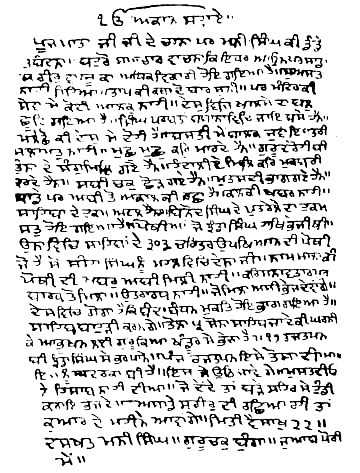
Acclaimed letter of Bhai Mani Singh discussing the compilation of various banis of Dasam Granth

The oldest manuscript of Dasam Granth is likely the Anandpuri Hazuri Bir (Not to be confused with the Anandpuri Marco Adi Granth). It is dated to 1698 CE. A few folio pages were definitely added later (Zafarnama and Hikayats), because they were composed after 1700 (circa 1705 CE), and are in a different style and format, and lack the folio numbers present on all pages elsewhere. These letters of Guru Gobind Singh may have been appended in the early 18th century. According to another view, the earliest surviving manuscript of the complete text is dated to 1713 CE (Bhai Mani Singh's manuscript), and the early manuscript versions have minor variations with apocryphal writings.

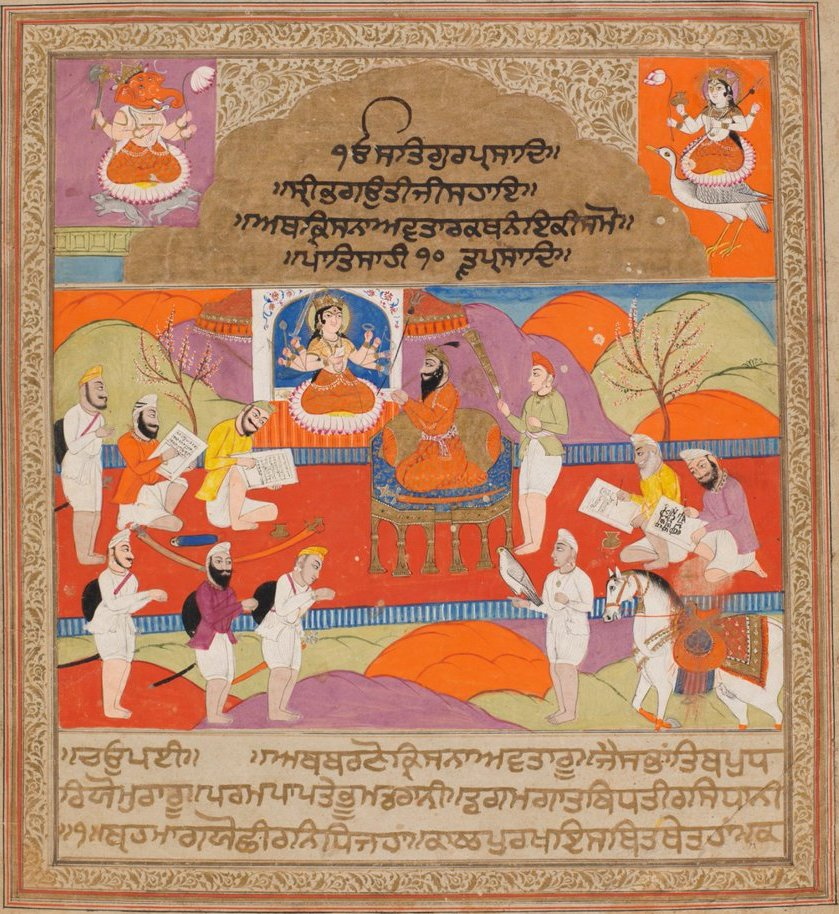
Guru Gobind Singh with the Goddess Bhagwati

Other important manuscripts include two Patna manuscripts both from 1698 CE found in Bihar, and the Mani Singh Vali Bir (1713 CE) in New Delhi. The Mani Singh Bir is a combined recension of the Adi Granth and Dasam Granth. It presents the Zafarnama and Hikayats in the Perso-Arabic Nastaliq script.

The early Anandpuri, Patna, and Mani Singh manuscripts include writings that are disputed in the contemporary era, as well as sections such as the Ugradanti and Sri Bhagauti Astotra that were removed from the Dasam Granth codified in the 20th century by the Sodhak Committee. There is also a manuscript of the Dasam Granth attributed to Bhai Daya Singh with many Apocryphal Writings, as well as the 1765 Illuminated Patna Missal manuscript from Jammu.

According to the Indologist Wendy Doniger, many orthodox Sikhs credit the authorship and compilation of the earliest Dasam Granth manuscript to Guru Gobind Singh directly, while other Sikhs and some scholars consider the text to have been authored and compiled partly by him and partly by many poets in his court at Anandpur.

Prior to 1902, there were numerous incomplete portions of manuscripts of Dasam Granth in circulation within the Sikh community along with the complete, but somewhat variant, major versions such as the Anandpuri and Patna birs. In 1885, during the Singh Sabha Movement, an organization called the Gurmat Granth Pracharak Sabha was founded by Sikhs to study the Sikh literature. This organization, with a request from Amritsar Singh Sabha, established the Sodhak Committee in 1897. The members of this committee studied 32 manuscripts of Dasam Granth from different parts of the Indian subcontinent. The committee deleted some hymns found in the different old manuscripts of the text, merged the others and thus created a 1,428-page version thereafter called the standard edition of the Dasam Granth. The standard edition was first published in 1902. It is this version that has predominantly been distributed to scholars and studied in and outside India. However, the prestige of the Dasam Granth was well established in the Sikh community during the Sikh Empire, as noted in 1812 by colonial-era scholar Malcolm. According to Robin Rinehart – a scholar of Sikhism and Sikh literature, modern copies of the Dasam Granth in Punjabi, and its English translations, often do not include the entire standard edition text and do not follow the same ordering either.

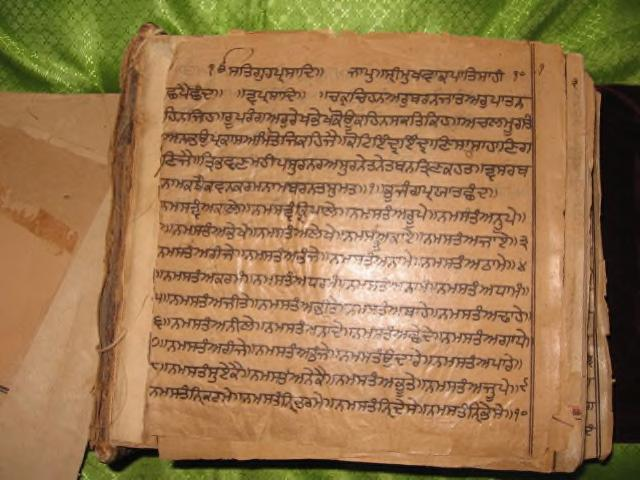
Opening folio of a Dasam Granth manuscript authored by Baba Deep Singh

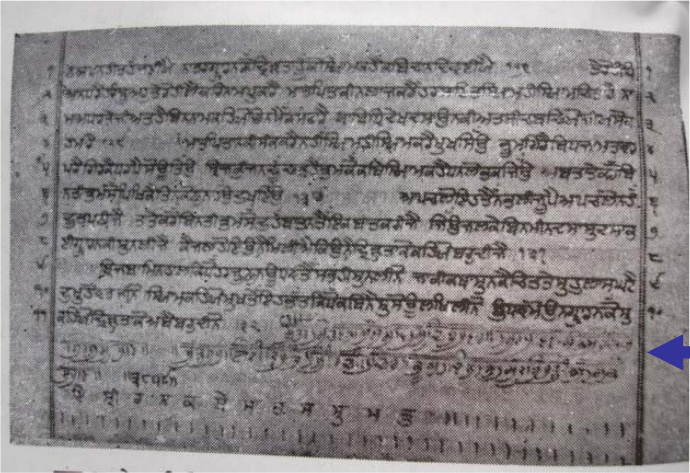
A correction authored by Guru Gobind Singh from the 'Anandpuri Hazuri Bir' (manuscript) of the Dasam Granth from 1698 CE

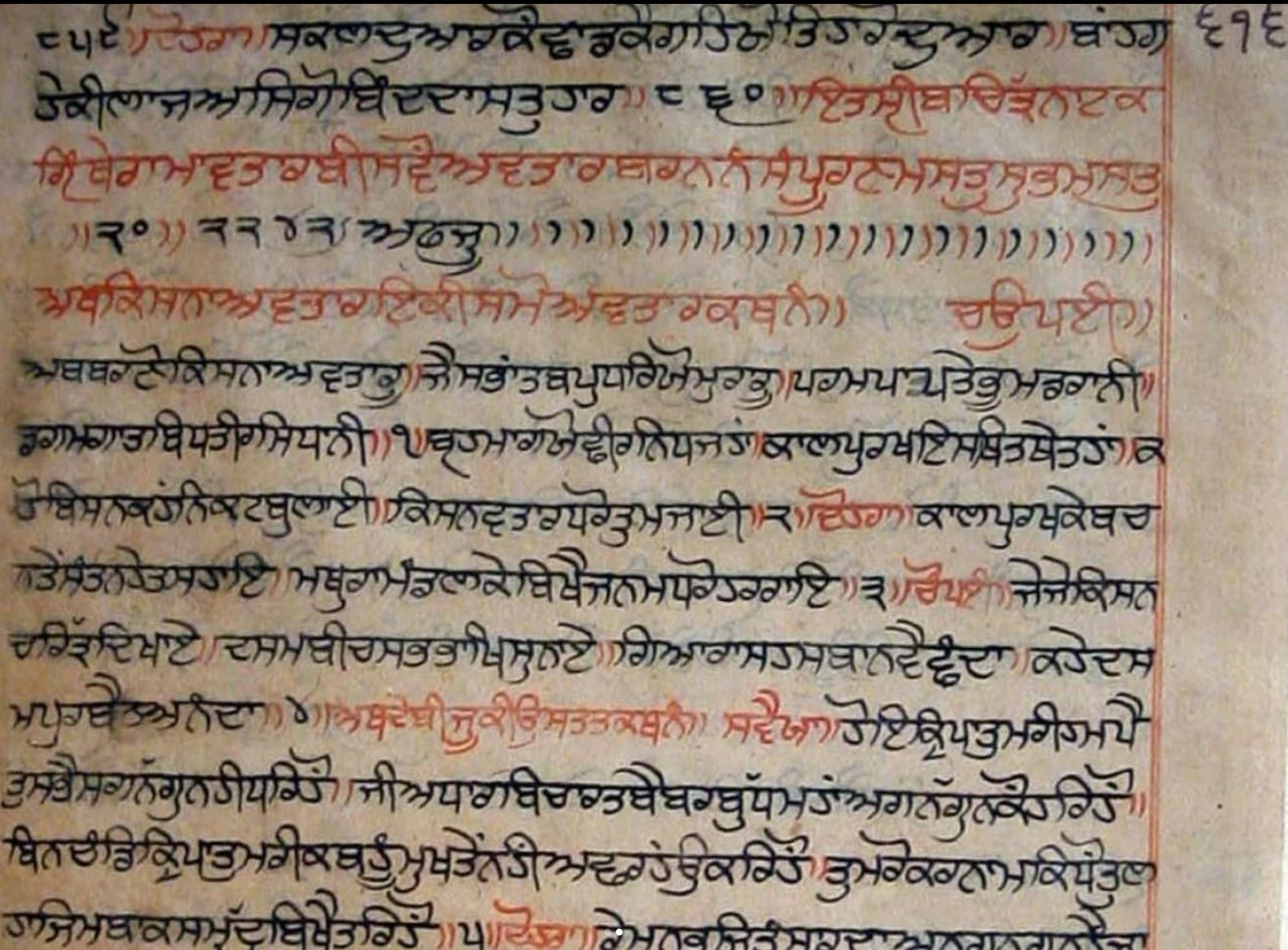
Page from the Bhai Mani Singh combined Adi-Dasam Manuscript authored in 1713 CE

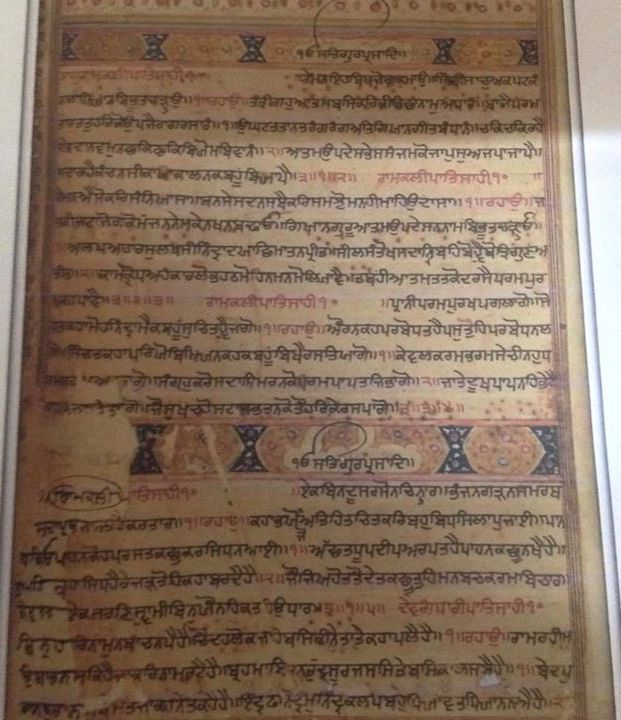
Decorated page of the Dasam Granth from a Patna Manuscript

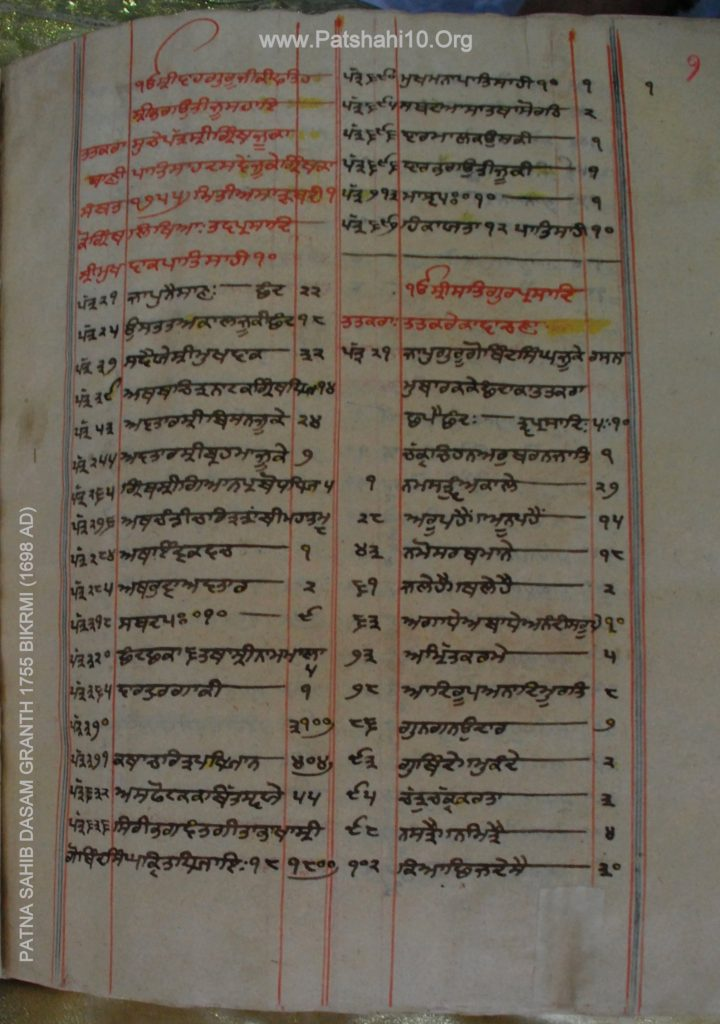
Another Patna Manuscript of the Dasam Granth authored in 1698 CE

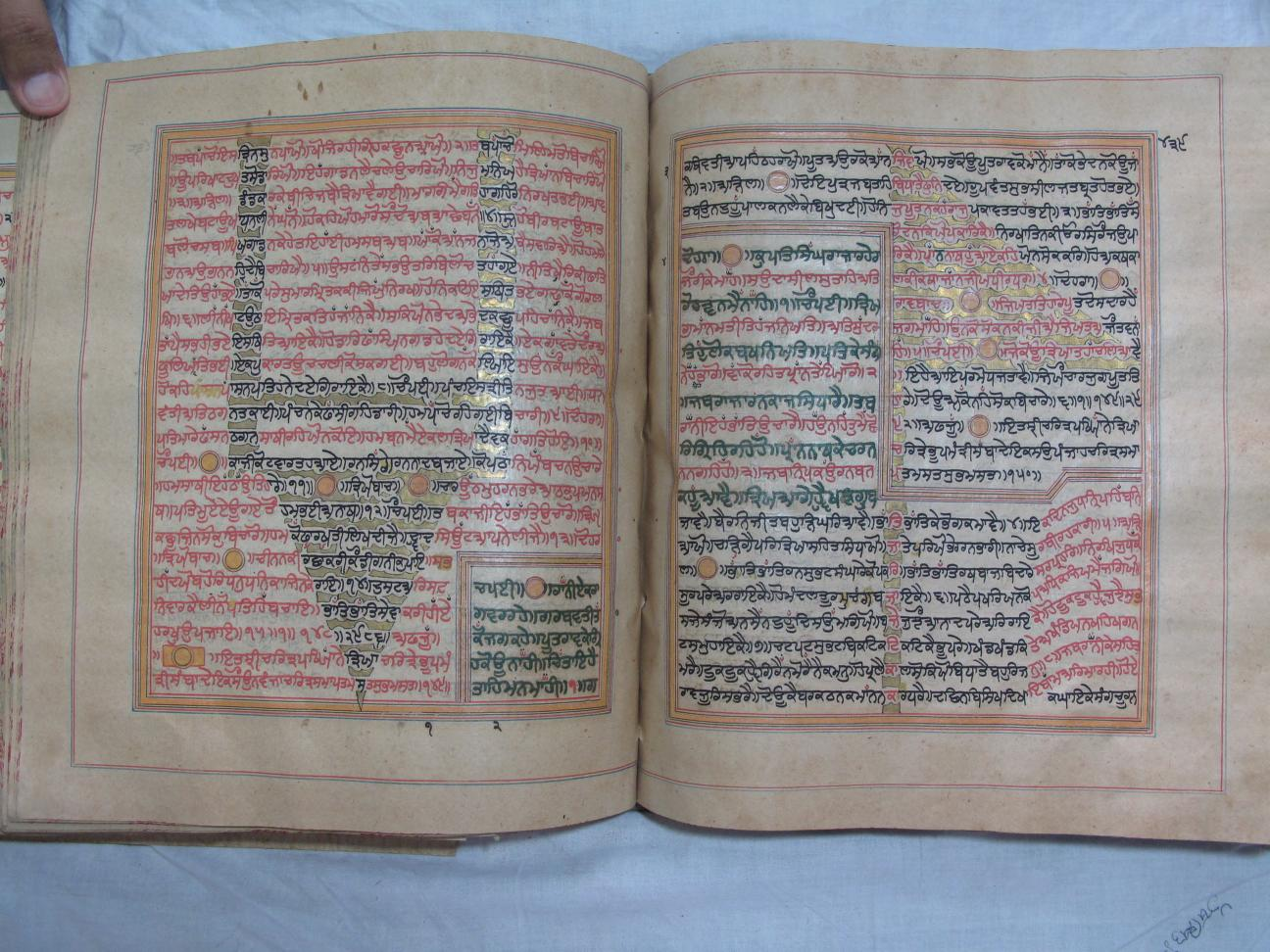
Illuminated Charitropakhyan folio from the Patna Missal Dasam Granth manuscript from 1765 CE

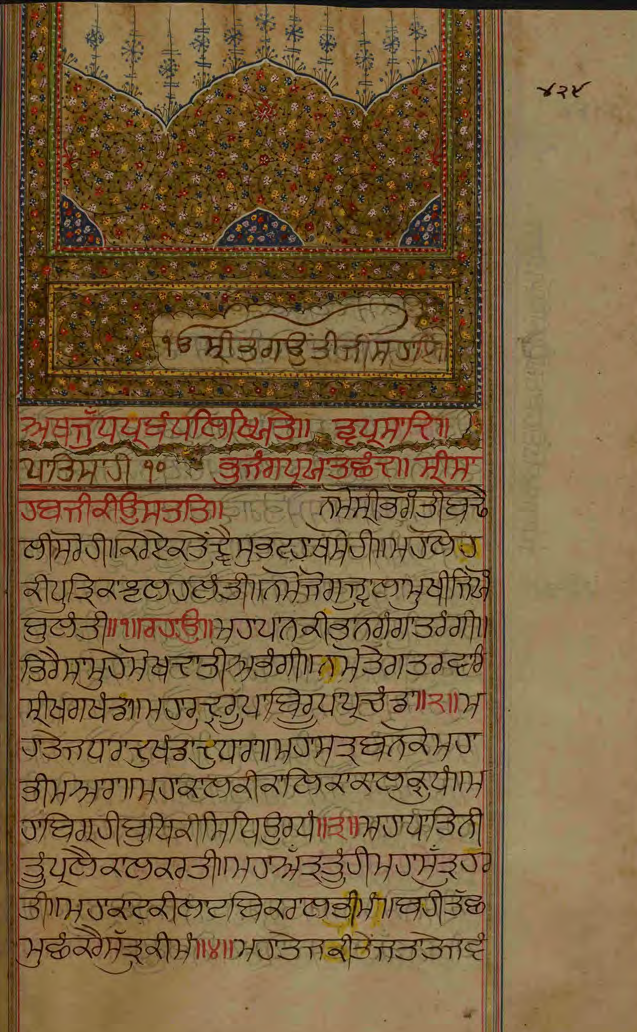
Folio of the Apocryphal "Bhagauti Astotar" Composition in the "Aurangabadi Dasam Granth Bir" attributed to Bhai Daya Singh

== Musicology ==
Similar to the Guru Granth Sahib, the verses found within the Dasam Granth are set to Indic classical music, known as gurmat sangeet. All-together, a total of 21 raags are employed in the Dasam Granth, compared to the 174 found in the Sarbloh Granth and the 62 found in the Guru Granth Sahib (which also contains 17 taals).

== Other compilations ==
=== Das Granthi ===
A Das Granthi (ਦਸ ਗ੍ਰੰਥੀ) is a small religious booklet containing only few selected compositions from Dasam Granth. Das stands for Ten and Granthi stands for booklet. It means Booklet of 10th Guru of Sikhism. This booklet was created for beginners and lay readers for reading these compositions in daily liturgy for proper understanding.

There is no standardization of this booklet and various sects in Sikhism have their own versions. The Shiromani Gurdwara Parbandhak Committee contains eight texts namely, Jaap, Bachitra Natak, Chandi Charitra I, Shabad Hazare Patshahi 10, Akal Ustati, Chandi Charitra 2, Gian Prabodh and Chandi di Var.

== See also ==
- History of Dasam Granth
- Sarbloh Granth
- Guru Gobind Singh
- Guru Granth Sahib
