= Chandi Charitar II =

Story of the Goddess in the Dasam Granth

Chandi Charitar II ਚੰਡੀ ਚਰਿਤ੍ਰ ਦੂਜਾ
- Dasam Granth
- ← Chandi Charitar Ukti Bilas Chandi Di Vaar →
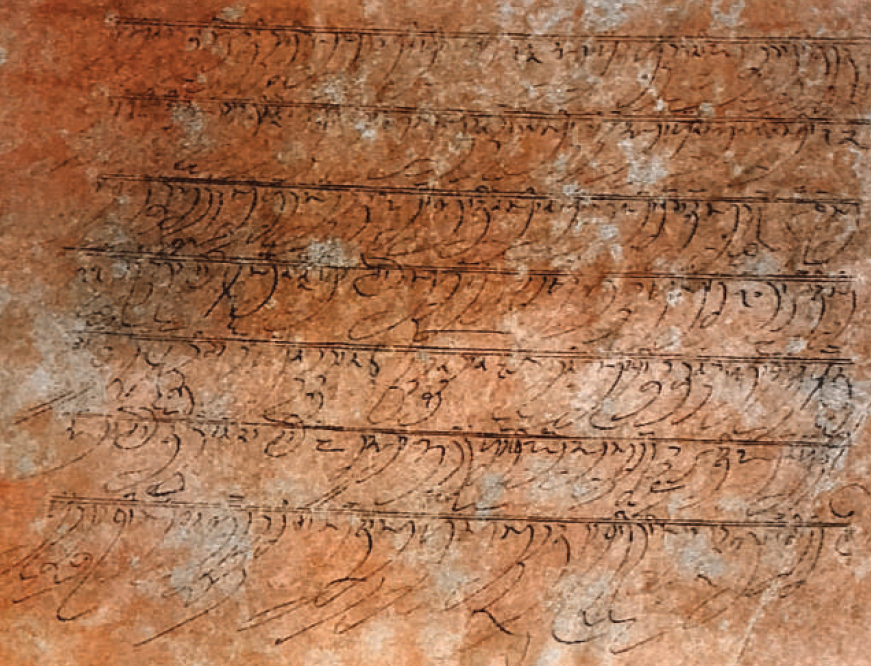
- Chapter 1 of the Chandi Charitar II in the hand of Guru Gobind Singh

Information
- Religion: Sikhism
- Author: Guru Gobind Singh
- Period: 1690s
- Chapters: 8
- Verses: 262

Chandi Charitar II or Chandi Charitar Duja or Ath Chandi Charitar Likhyate (Punjabi: ਚੰਡੀ ਚਰਿਤ੍ਰ ਦੂਜਾ, lit. 'The Story of Chandi (2)'), is the 5th chapter of the Dasam Granth, whose authorship is generally attributed to Guru Gobind Singh. The plot of the text is based on the Markandeya Purana, much like the previous Chandi Charitar I.

A retelling of the story of the Hindu goddess, Durga again in the form of Chandi; it again glorifies the feminine with her fighting the war between good and evil, and in this section she slays the buffalo-demon Mahisha, all his associates and supporters thus bringing an end to the demonic violence and war.

== Overview ==
This composition deals with themes of battle and war. Its authorship is generally and traditionally attributed to Guru Gobind Singh. This composition was written in Braj at Anandpur Sahib, Punjab.

It has eight cantos, contains 262 couplets and quatrains, mostly employing Bhujang Prayat and Rasaval measures (chhands), divided into 8 chapters.

== Authenticity ==
This work was composed at Anandpur Sahib, sometime before 1698 CE, the year when the Bachitar Natak was completed. According to Max Arthur Macauliffe, the composition was written by bards in who were employed by Guru Gobind Singh and translated the Durga Saptashati. He could not ascertain whether principles of Sikhism were actually imbibed in Chandi Charitras or if they had a flavor of Hinduism is still in it.

It differs from Chandi Charitar Ukti Bilas in that it does not reference the chapters within the Markandeya Purana, but still tells the same story. The work contains 262 verses in total. The 8th and last chapter of the Chandi Charitar II is known as Chandi Charitar Ustat (ਅਥ ਚੰਡੀ ਚਰਿਤ੍ਰ ਉਸਤਤ) where it praises the goddess.

Other related compositions include Chandi Charitar Ukti Bilas, Chandi Di Vaar, and Uggardanti.

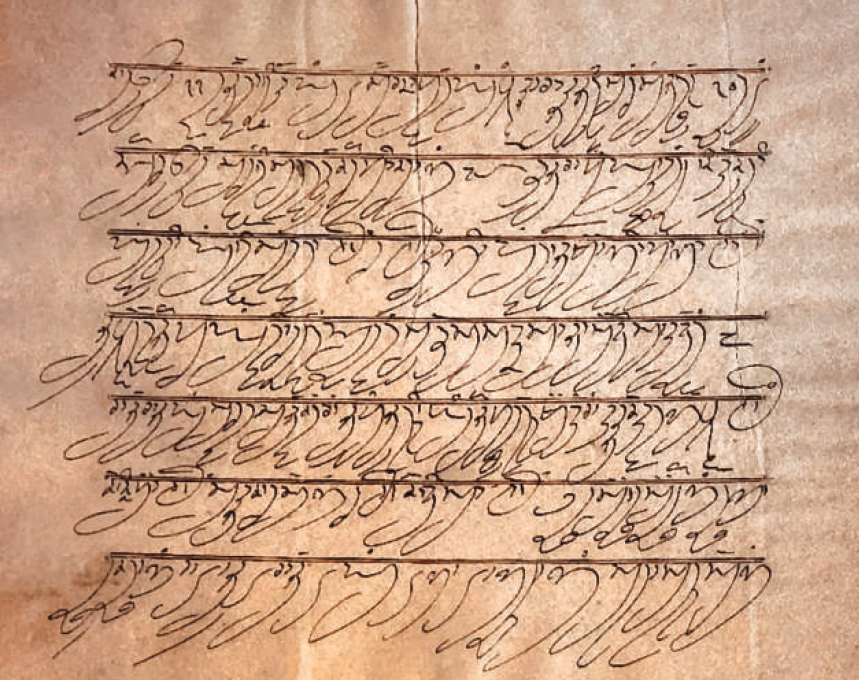
Chapter 6 of the Chandi Charitar II in the hand of Guru Gobind Singh
