= Chandi Charitar I =

Heroic poetic composition

Chandi Charitar Ukti Bilas ਚੰਡੀ ਚਰਿਤ੍ਰ ੳਕਤਿ ਬਿਲਾਸ
- Dasam Granth
- ← Bachitar Natak Chandi Charitar II →
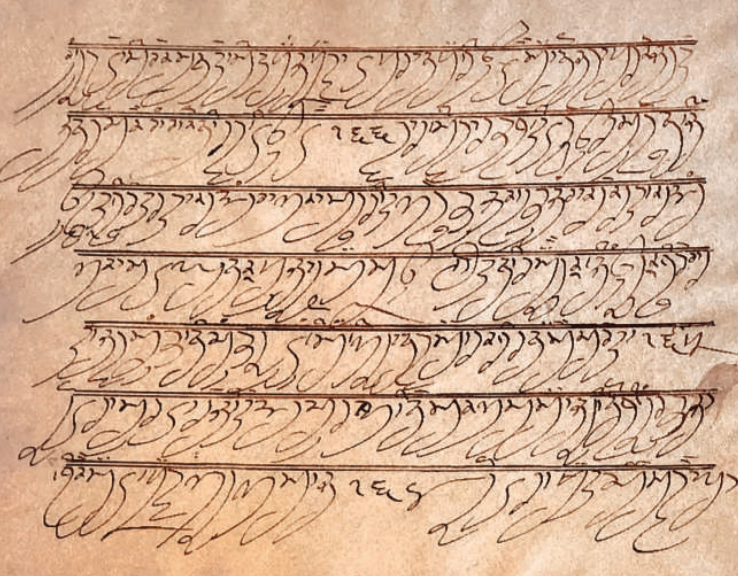
- Folio of the Chandi Charitar Ukti Bilas (Chandi Charitar 1) Composition in the hand of Guru Gobind Singh

Information
- Religion: Sikhism
- Author: Guru Gobind Singh
- Period: 1695
- Chapters: 7 or 8
- Verses: 233

Chandi Charitar Ukti Bilas or Chandi Charitar Ukat(i) Bilas (Punjabi: ਚੰਡੀ ਚਰਿਤ੍ਰ ੳਕਤਿ ਬਿਲਾਸ, lit. 'enjoyment of the recitation of Chandi's deeds', pronunciation: [t͡ʃnɖi t͡ʃəɾɪt̪ɾə ukt̪ɪ bɪläːs]), also called Chandi Charitar 1 (ਚੰਡੀ ਚਰਿਤ੍ਰ (ਭਾਗ ੧)) or Chandi Charitar Part One is a heroic poetic composition, included as the 4th chapter of Dasam Granth, whose authorship is generally and traditionally attributed to Guru Gobind Singh.

Though it is based on Markandeya Purana, the direction and narration of whole story is independent of the Markandeya Purana.

== Overview ==
The text follows the Bachitar Natak and is itself followed by Chandi Charitar II.

The text states it is retelling the Markandeya Purana story, where Durga fights a shape shifting buffalo demon Mahishasura and slays the evil demon and his companions. The names Chandi and Chandika are also used to refer to the devi (goddess). It is based specifically on the Durga Saptasati chapter of the Markandeya Purana. Chandi Charitar II repeats the same storyline in a shorter form.

Chandi Charitar Ukti Bilas is divided into eight cantos, and consists of 233 couplets and quatrains, employing seven different poetic metres, with Savaiya and Dohara predominating. The source of the story mentioned is Durga Saptasati, which is a portion of the Markandeya Purana, from chapters 81 to 94.

ਇਤਿ ਸ੍ਰੀ ਮਾਰਕੰਡੇ ਪੁਰਾਨੇ ਚੰਡੀ ਚਰਿਤ੍ਰ ਉਕਤਿ ਬਿਲਾਸ ਮਧਕੈਟਭ ਬਧਹਿ ਪ੍ਰਥਮ ਧਿਆਇ ॥੧॥

eit sree maaraka(n)dde puraane cha(n)ddee charitr ukat bilaas madhakaiTabh badheh pratham dhiaai ||1||

End of the First Chapter of ‘The Killing of Madhu and Kaitabh’ as described in Chandi Charitra Ukati of the Markandeya Purana.1.

The language of the composition is Braj. Ukti Bilas was composed at Anandpur Sahib, before 1698, the year when the Bichitra Natak was completed. The concluding lines from the last canto of Chandi Charitra Ukti Bilas in a Dasam Granth manuscript preserved at Patna mention 1752 Bk / AD 1695 as the year of completion.

Other related compositions include Chandi Charitar II, Chandi Di Vaar, and Uggardanti.

== Contents ==
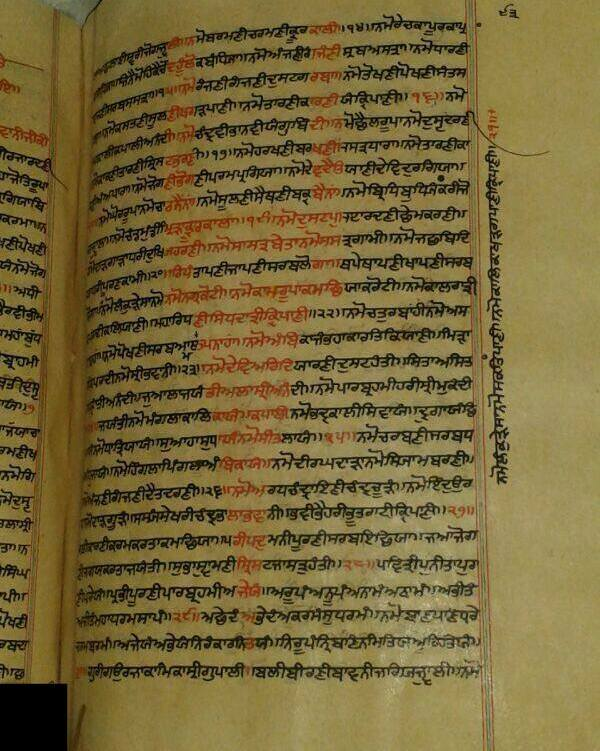
Chandi Charitar section from an old manuscript of the Dasam Granth. A 'kattar' (Indic push dagger) is visible due to the creative usage of ink colours by the scribe

One of the most popular hymns in Sikhism is taken from Chandi Charitar Ukati Bilas:

ਦੇਹ ਸਿਵਾ ਬਰੁ ਮੋਹਿ ਇਹੈ ਸੁਭ ਕਰਮਨ ਤੇ ਕਬਹੂੰ ਨ ਟਰੋਂ ॥
ਨ ਡਰੋਂ ਅਰਿ ਸੋ ਜਬ ਜਾਇ ਲਰੋਂ ਨਿਸਚੈ ਕਰਿ ਅਪੁਨੀ ਜੀਤ ਕਰੋਂ ॥
ਅਰੁ ਸਿਖ ਹੋਂ ਆਪਨੇ ਹੀ ਮਨ ਕੌ ਇਹ ਲਾਲਚ ਹਉ ਗੁਨ ਤਉ ਉਚਰੋਂ ॥
ਜਬ ਆਵ ਕੀ ਅਉਧ ਨਿਦਾਨ ਬਨੈ ਅਤਿ ਹੀ ਰਨ ਮੈ ਤਬ ਜੂਝ ਮਰੋਂ ॥੨੩੧॥

देह शिवा बर मोहे ईहे, शुभ कर्मन ते कबहूं न टरूं ।
न डरौं अरि सौं जब जाय लड़ौं निश्चय कर अपनी जीत करौं ।
अरु सिख हों आपने ही मन कौ इह लालच हउ गुन तउ उचरों ।
जब आव की अउध निदान बनै अति ही रन मै तब जूझ मरों ॥२३१॥

O Siva (epithet for Waheguru) grant me the boon, that I may never deviate from doing a good deed.
That I shall not fear when I go into combat.
And with determination I will be victorious.
That I may teach myself this greed alone, to learn only Thy praises.
And when the last days of my life come, I may die in the might of the battlefield.

== Bibliography ==
- Sri Dasam Granth Sahib: Questions and Answers: The book on Sri Dasam Granth Sahib
