= Rudra Avtar =

Epic poem in Sikh literature

Rudra Avtar ਰੁਦਰ ਅਵਤਾਰ
- Dasam Granth
- ← Brahma Avtar Shabad Hazare →
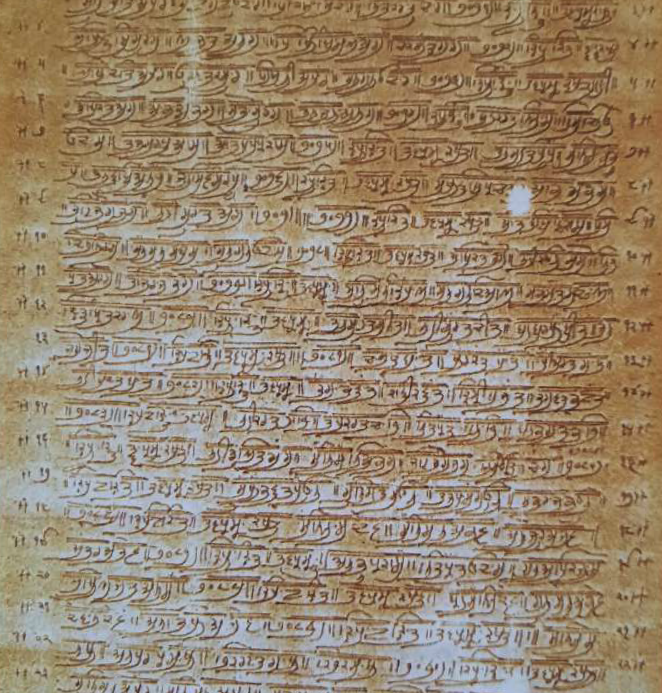
- Folio of Ruda Avtar written in the hand of Guru Gobind Singh

Information
- Religion: Sikhism
- Author: Guru Gobind Singh
- Period: 1698

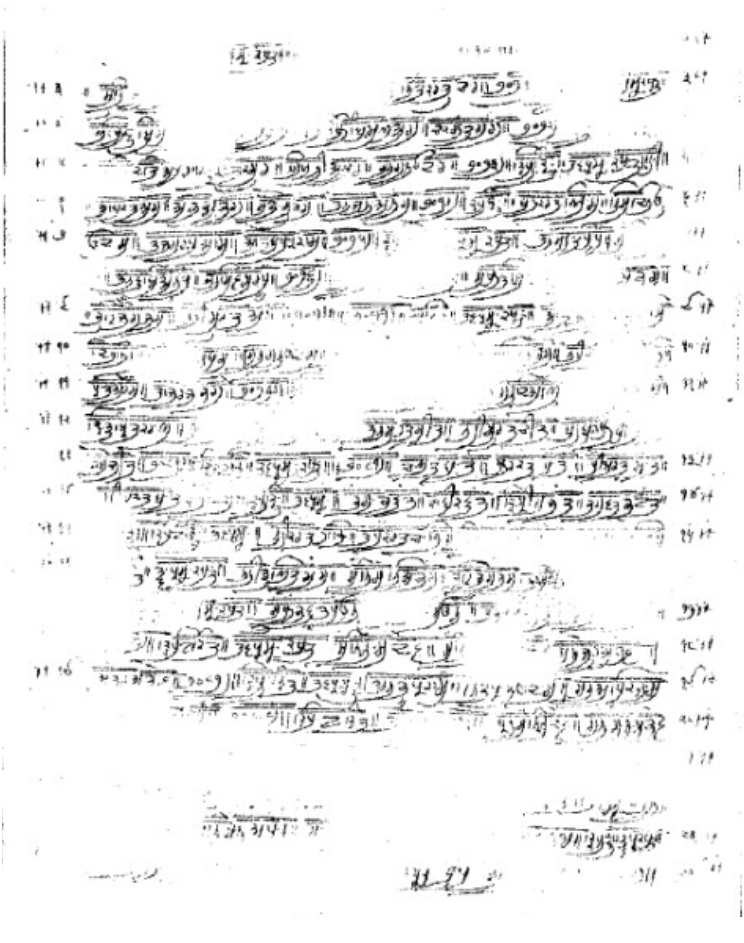
A page from the "Datta Avtar" (Dattareya) chapter of the Rudra Avtar composition within the Dasam Granth, in Guru Gobind Singh's hand

Rudra Avtar (Punjabi: ਰੁਦਰ ਅਵਤਾਰ, pronunciation: [ɾʊd̪əɾ əʋtaːɾ]) is an epic poem under the title Ath Rudra Avtar Kathan(n) regarding the incarnations (avtars) of Shiva. It is traditionally said to have been written by Guru Gobind Singh. It is included in Dasam Granth, which is considered to be the second-most important scripture of the Sikhs. It is sometimes grouped together with the preceding Brahma Avtar composition into a combination termed as the Upāvatār (meaning "lesser avatars").

== Synopsis ==
The Rudra Avtar covers the stories of two avatars, or incarnations, related to Rudra or Shiva. This composition covers the most important wars within Sikh philosophy, such as the fight between Bibek Buddhi and Abibek Budhi, (truth and falsity), and the fight between wisdom and ignorance.

This composition covers the concepts of Gyaan (Knowledge) and Dhyana (Attention) and is against fake ritualism and practices.

=== Incarnations of Rudra (Shiva) ===
Guru Gobind Singh sanctified and narrated the life history of two souls, designating them with the title Rudra and as incarnations of Rudra:

1. Datta (Dattatreya) - Hindu monk
2. Parasnath (Parshvanatha) - 23rd Tirthankar of Jainism.

==== Datta ====
Twenty-three gurus are recounted in this chapter and the pen-name of Syām is used by the author near the end of the chapter.

==== Parasnath ====
Second of the two chapters of the Rudra Avtar, the composition has 358 Channds. The composition is about the life history of Parasnath and his discourse with Matsyendranath. Verses no.45–89 describe Parasnath paying obeisance to Durga.

== History ==
This poem was written in Anandpur Sahib, probably in 1698 CE (1755 in the Vikram Samvat calendar).

This text is part of Bachittar Natak Granth, as per rubrics at the end. Although modern interpreters believe that a portion of Guru Gobind Singh's life, which he refers to as Apni Katha is Bachittar Natak, the rest of the compositions are independent from it.

This composition is present in every early manuscript, i.e. those of Mani Singh, Motibagh, Sangrur and Patna.

The language of the composition is Hindi with a mixture of Sanskrit words.

The First six Chandds are introductory. 849 Chandds narrate Dattatreya, and 359 Chandds narrate about Paras Nath.

Unlike "Chandi Charitar" and "Krishna Avtar", the source of narration of "Rudra Avtar" does not come from the 36 Puranas.
