= Sikhism =

Religion originating in Punjab, India

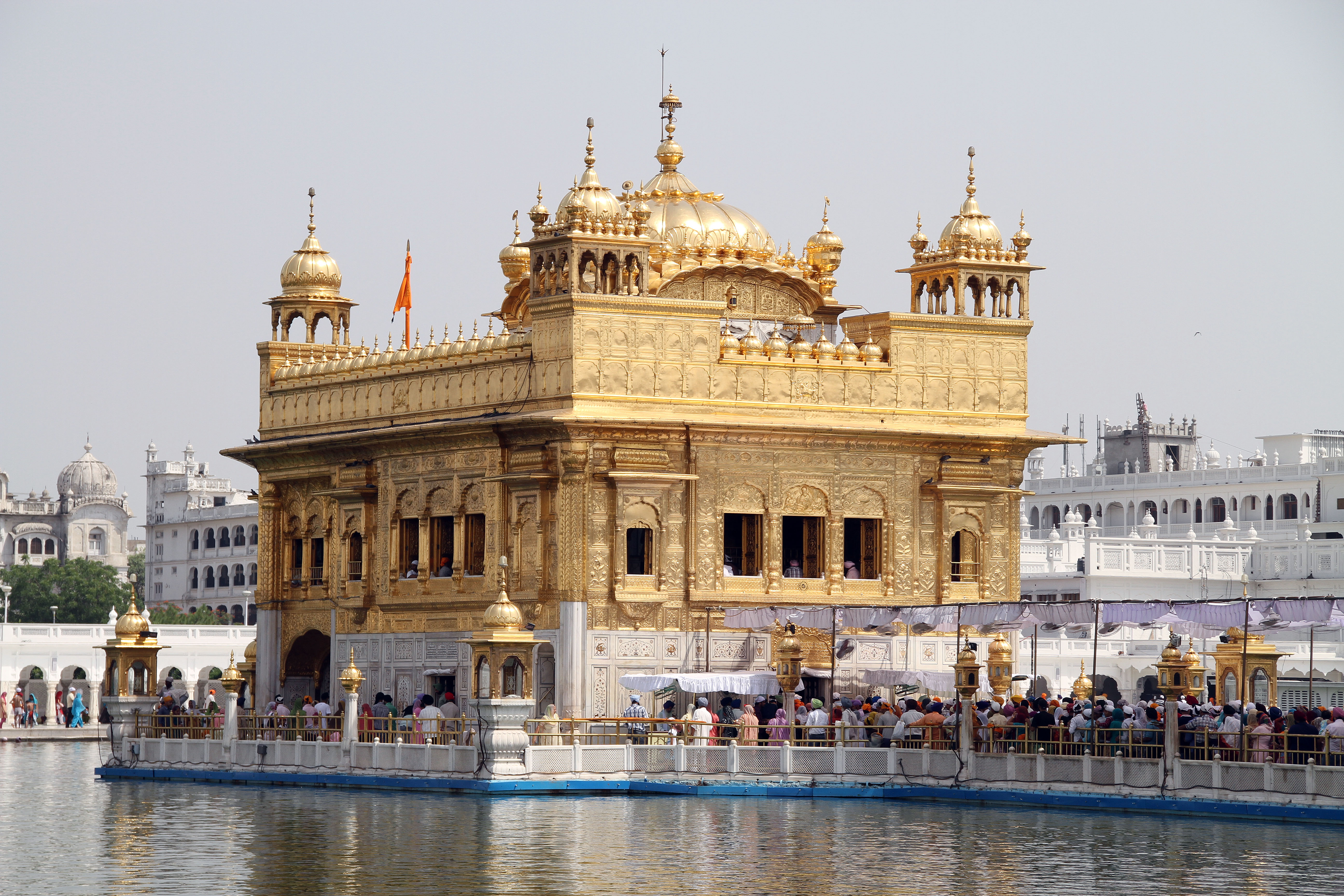
- Golden Temple in Amritsar, Punjab, India. It is the spiritual capital of Sikhism.
- Classification: Indian
- Scripture: Guru Granth Sahib
- Theology: Panentheism; Monotheism
- Governance: Panj Takht
- Region: Predominant religion in Punjab, India (58%), and widespread worldwide as minorities (Sikh diaspora)
- Language: Punjabi and its dialects Sant Bhasha; Khalsa bole
- Headquarters: Akal Takht, Amritsar, Punjab, India
- Founder: Guru Nanak
- Origin: 15th–16th century CE; Punjab
- Separations: Contemporary Sant Mat movements Ravidassia; Gulabdasia; Bhaniara Dera
- Number of followers: c. 25–30 million (individually referred to as Sikhs, collectively referred to as Sikh Panth)

Sikhism, (Note: English pronunciation: /ˈsiːkɪzəm/ SEEK-iz-əm.) also known as Sikhi, (Note: Punjabi: ਸਿੱਖੀ, IAST: Sikkhī, pronounced [ˈsɪkkʰiː]; from ਸਿੱਖ, Sikh, 'disciple'.) is an Indian religion and philosophy that originated in the Punjab region of the Indian subcontinent around the end of the 15th century CE. It is one of the most recently founded major religions and is followed by 25–30 million adherents, known as Sikhs.

Sikhism developed from the spiritual teachings of Guru Nanak (1469–1539), the faith's first guru, and the nine Sikh gurus who succeeded him. The tenth guru, Guru Gobind Singh (1666–1708), named the Guru Granth Sahib, which is the central religious scripture in Sikhism, as his successor. This brought the line of human gurus to a close. Sikhs regard the Guru Granth Sahib as the 11th and eternally living Guru.

The core beliefs and practices of Sikhism, articulated in the Guru Granth Sahib and other Sikh scriptures, include faith and meditation in the name of the one creator (Ik Onkar), the divine unity and equality of all humankind, engaging in selfless service to others (sevā), striving for justice for the benefit and prosperity of all (sarbat da bhala), and honest conduct and livelihood. Following this standard, Sikhism rejects claims that any particular religious tradition has a monopoly on absolute truth. As a consequence, Sikhs do not actively proselytise, although voluntary converts are generally accepted. Sikhism emphasises meditation and remembrance as a means to feel God's presence (simran), which can be expressed musically through kirtan or internally through naam japna (lit. 'meditation on God's name'). Baptised Sikhs are obliged to wear the five Ks, which are five articles of faith that physically distinguish Sikhs from non-Sikhs. Among these include the kesh (uncut hair). Most religious Sikh men thus do not cut their hair but rather wear a turban. (Note: Women may optionally wear a turban.)

The definition of a Sikh, according to the Rehat Maryada, the Sikh code of conduct, is any human being who faithfully believes in the following:

1. One Immortal Being,
2. Ten Gurus, from Guru Nanak Sahib to Guru Gobind Singh Sahib,
3. The Guru Granth Sahib,
4. The utterances and teachings of the ten Gurus and,
5. The baptism bequeathed by the tenth Guru;

and who does not owe allegiance to any other religion.

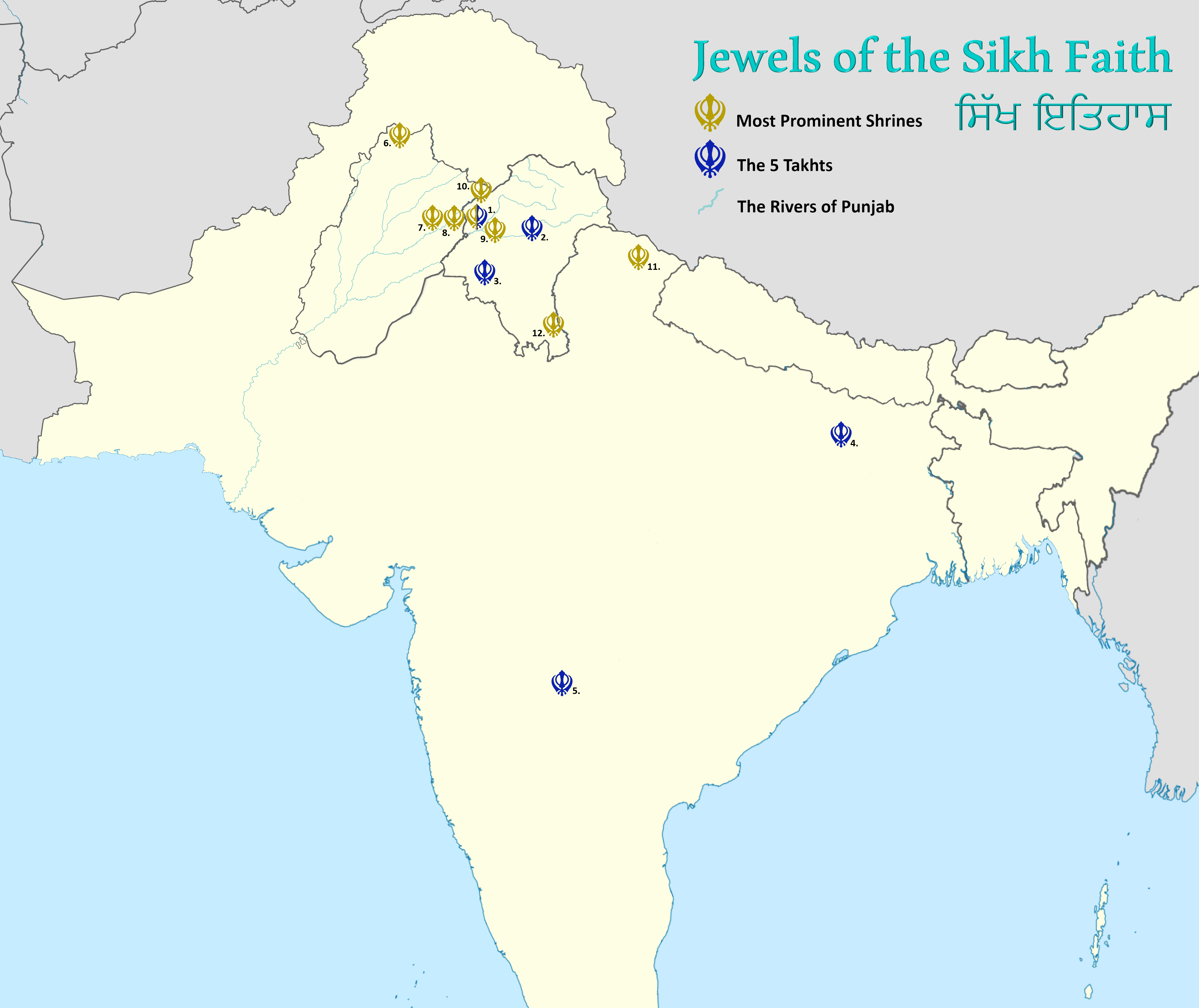
Prominent Sikh shrines: 1. Golden Temple, Akaal Takht; 2. Kesgarh Sahib; 3. Damdama Sahib; 4. Patna Sahib; 5. Hazur Sahib; 6. Panja Sahib; 7. Nankana Sahib; 8. Dera Sahib; 9. Ber Sahib; 10. Kartarpur Sahib, Dera Baba Nanak; 11. Hemkund Sahib; 12. Sis Ganj Sahib

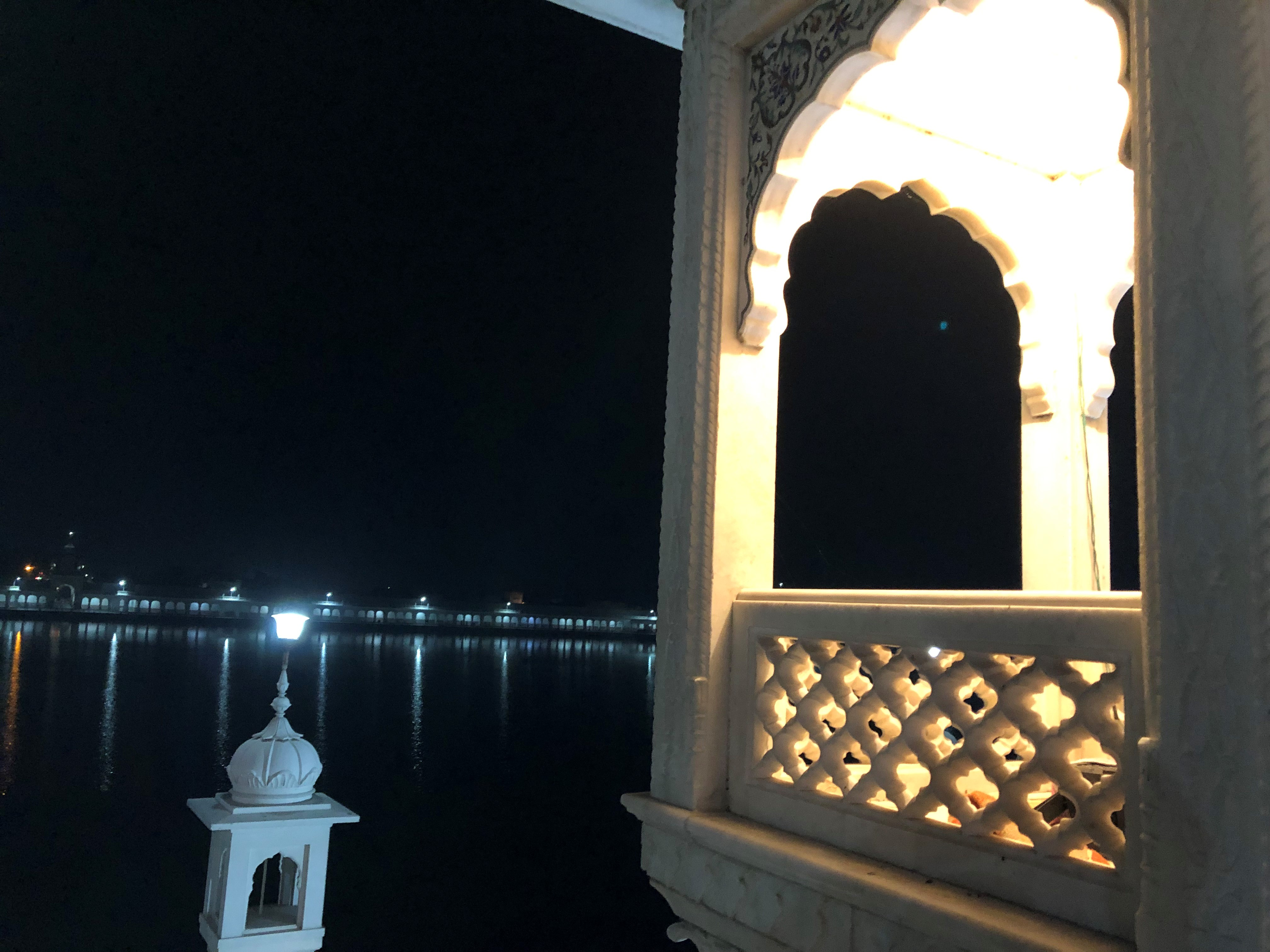
Tarn Taran Sahib – The World's Largest Sarovar (sacred pool)

The religion developed and evolved in times of religious persecution, gaining converts from both Hinduism and Islam. The Mughal emperors of India tortured and executed two of the Sikh gurus—Guru Arjan (1563–1606) and Guru Tegh Bahadur (1621–1675)—after they refused to convert to Islam. The persecution of the Sikhs triggered the founding of the Khalsa by Guru Gobind Singh in 1699 as an order to protect the freedom of conscience and religion, with members expressing the qualities of a sant-sipāhī ("saint-soldier").

== Terminology ==
The majority of Sikh scriptures were originally written in the alphabet of Gurmukhī, a script standardised by Guru Angad out of Laṇḍā scripts historically used in present-day Pakistan and North India. Adherents of Sikhism are known as Sikhs, meaning "students" or "disciples" of the guru. The English word Sikhism derives from the Punjabi word for the religion Sikhi (Punjabi: ਸਿੱਖੀ Sikkhī, [ˈsɪk.kʰiː], from Punjabi: ਸਿੱਖ, romanised: Sikh, lit. 'disciple'), (Note: Sikhism (commonly known as Sikhī) originated from the word Sikh, which comes from the Sanskrit root śiṣya meaning "disciple", or śikṣa meaning "instruction". Singh, Khushwant. 2006. The Illustrated History of the Sikhs. Oxford University Press. ISBN 978-0-19-567747-8. p. 15.Kosh, Gur Shabad Ratnakar Mahan. https://web.archive.org/web/20050318143533/http://www.ik13.com/online_library.htm) which connotes the "temporal path of learning" and is rooted in the verb sikhana (lit. 'to learn'). The Global Institute of Sikh Studies translates the term Sikh as meaning "bearers of sikhiā [wisdom]".

Some Sikhs oppose the exonym term Sikhism as they claim the word was coined by the British colonists rather than by Sikhs themselves, and they instead prefer the endonym Sikhi. They argue that an "-ism" connotes a fixed and immutable worldview which is not congruent with the internally fluid nature of the Sikh philosophy. Other terms Sikhs use to name their faith are gursikhi, gurmat, or dharam.

== Philosophy and teachings ==
The basis of Sikhism lies in the teachings of Guru Nanak and his successors. Sikhs emphasise the congruence between spiritual development and everyday moral conduct. Its founder, Guru Nanak, summarised this perspective by saying, "Truth is the highest virtue, but higher still is truthful living." Sikhism emphasises Ėk nūr te sab jag upjiā, 'From the one light, the entire universe welled up.' Guru Nanak also emphasised his teachings to his disciples by giving them real-life examples.

=== God ===
Sikhism is a monotheistic and panentheistic religion. Sikhs believe that only one God exists and that God is simultaneously within everything and is all-encompassing. The oneness of God is reflected by the phrase Ik Onkar. In Sikhism, the word for God is Waheguru (lit. 'wondrous teacher'). The Waheguru is considered to be Nirankar ("shapeless"), Akal ("timeless"), Karta Purakh ("the creator being"), Akaal Purkh ("beyond time and death") and Agam Agochar ("incomprehensible and invisible").

In a literal sense, God has no gender in Sikhism, but metaphorically, God is presented as masculine and God's power as feminine. For example, Guru Gobind Singh refers to God as his father and God's creative power as his mother. Similarly, another example is that the Guru Granth Sahib, the primary Sikh scripture, says that all humans are soul-brides who long to unite with their husband Lord. In addition, the gurus also wrote in the Guru Granth Sahib that there are many worlds on which the transcendental God has created life.

The Sikh scripture begins with God as Ik Onkar (ੴ), the 'One Creator', understood in the Sikh tradition as monotheistic unity of God. Ik onkar (sometimes capitalised) is more loosely rendered 'the one supreme reality', 'the one creator', 'the all-pervading spirit', and other ways of expressing a diffused but unified and singular sense of God and creation.

The traditional Mul Mantar goes from ik onkar until Nanak hosee bhee sach. The opening line of the Guru Granth Sahib and each subsequent raga mentions ik onkar:

{ੴ} ਸਤਿ ਨਾਮੁ ਕਰਤਾ ਪੁਰਖੁ ਨਿਰਭਉ ਨਿਰਵੈਰੁ ਅਕਾਲ ਮੂਰਤਿ ਅਜੂਨੀ ਸੈਭੰ ਗੁਰ ਪ੍ਰਸਾਦਿ॥
{ikk ōankār} sat(i) nām(u) karatā purakh(u) nirabha'u niravair(u) akāl(a) mūrat(i) ajūnī saibhan gur(a) prasād(i)
"There is one supreme being, the eternal reality, the creator, without fear and devoid of enmity, immortal, never incarnated, self-existent, known by grace through the true guru."

— Guru Granth Sahib (17th c.), p. 1

=== Worldly illusion ===
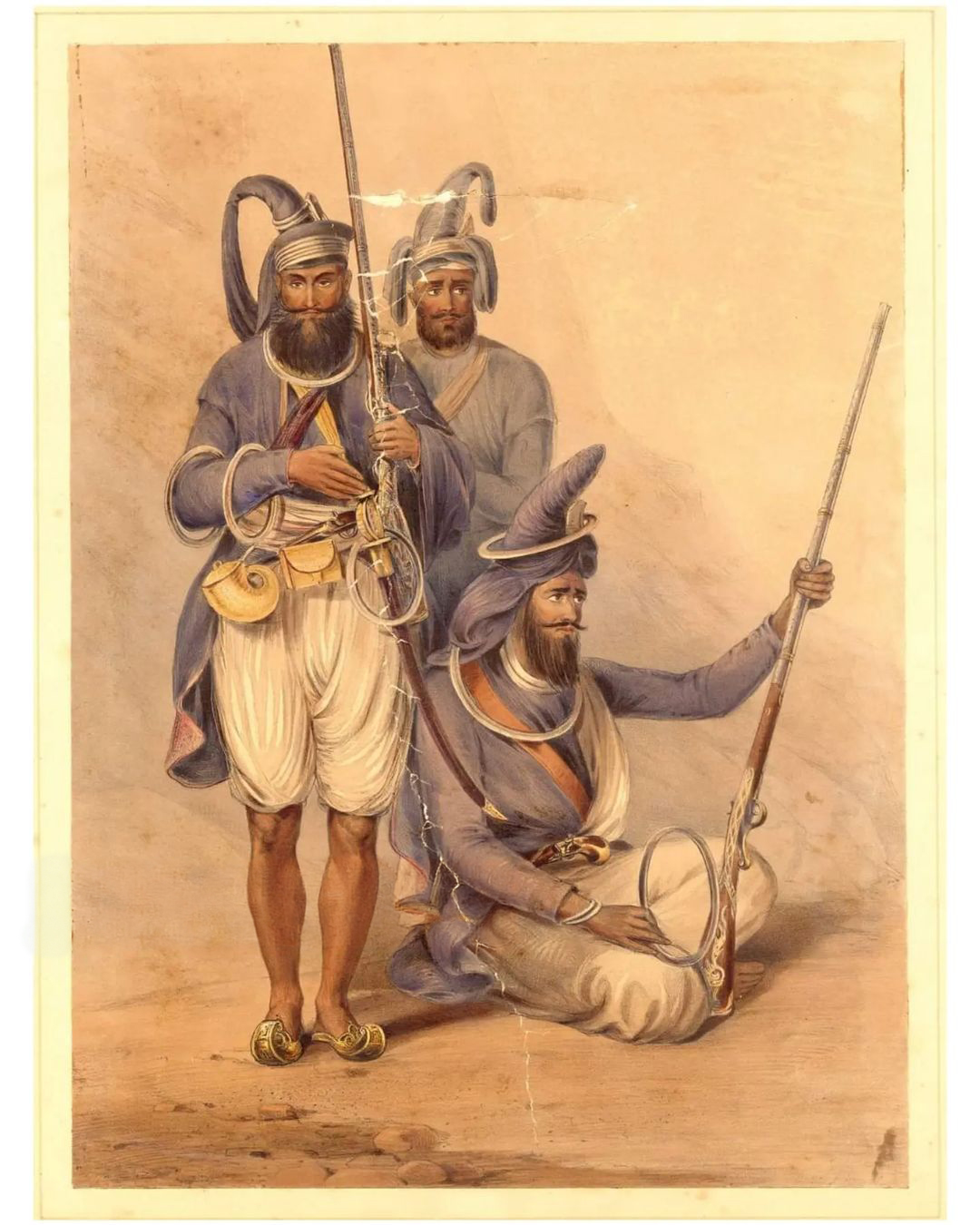
A sketch made in 1844 by Emily Eden of the "Akalees or Immortals". Digitised by the Panjab Digital Library.

Māyā, defined as a temporary illusion or "unreality", is one of the core deviations from the pursuit of God and salvation: where worldly attractions give only illusory, temporary satisfaction and pain that distracts from the process of devotion to God. However, Nanak emphasised māyā as not a reference to the world's unreality but to its values. In Sikhism, the influences of ego, anger, greed, attachment, and lust, known as the pānj chor ('Five Thieves'), are believed to be particularly distracting and hurtful. Sikhs believe the world is currently in a state of Kali Yuga ('age of darkness') because the world is led astray by the love of and attachment to māyā. The fate of people vulnerable to the five thieves is separation from God, and the situation may be remedied only after intensive and relentless devotion.

=== Timeless truth ===
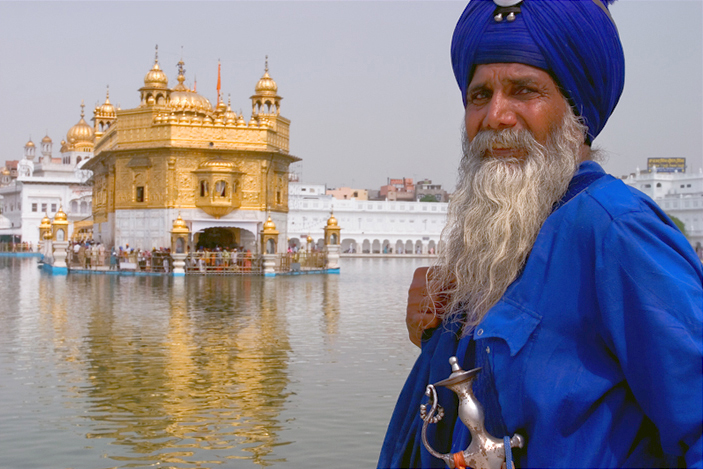
A Nihang Sikh at the Harmandir Sahib, also called the Golden Temple

According to Guru Nanak, the supreme purpose of human life is to reconnect with Akal ('The Timeless One'). However, egotism is the most significant barrier to making this connection. Using the Guru's teaching remembrance of nām (the divine Name of the Lord) leads to the end of egotism. Guru Nanak designated the word Guru ('teacher') to mean the voice of "the spirit": the source of knowledge and the guide to salvation. As ik onkar is universally immanent, Guru is indistinguishable from Akal and are one and the same.

=== Liberation ===
Guru Nanak's teachings are founded not on a final destination of heaven or hell but on a spiritual union with the Akal, which results in salvation or jivanmukti ('enlightenment/liberation within one's lifetime'), a concept also found in Hinduism. Guru Gobind Singh makes it clear that human birth is obtained with great fortune, and therefore one needs to be able to make the most of this life.

Sikhs accept reincarnation and karma concepts found in Buddhism, Hinduism, and Jainism, (Note: "As an Indian religion, Sikhism affirms transmigration, the continued rebirth after death". Brekke, Torkel (2014). Reichberg, G. M.; Syse, H. (eds.). Religion, War, and Ethics: A Sourcebook of Textual Traditions. Cambridge University Press. p. 672. ISBN 978-1-139-95204-0 – via Google Books.) (Note: "Sikhism, an Indian religion founded in the Punjab in the late 15th century." (McLeod 2019/1998).) but do not necessarily infer a metaphysical soteriology such as a state of "heaven" or "nirvana." Nevertheless, in Sikhism, both karma and liberation are "modified by the concept of God's grace" (nadar, mehar, kirpa, karam, etc.). Guru Nanak states that "the body takes birth because of karma, but salvation is attained through grace." To get closer to God, Sikhs: avoid the evils of maya; keep the everlasting truth in mind; practice shabad kirtan (musical recitation of hymns); meditate on naam; and serve humanity. Sikhs believe that being in the company of the satsang (association with sat, 'true', people) or sadh sangat is one of the key ways to achieve liberation from the cycles of reincarnation. The Sikh community may be seen to correspond to A.D. Smith's definition of a politicised community, sharing common ancestry myths and historical memories of martyrdom and persecution under successive rulers.

=== Power and devotion (Miri and Piri) ===
Miri Piri is a doctrine practiced in the Sikh religion since the seventeenth century. The doctrine of the "Mir" (social and political aspects of life) and the "Pir" (guides to the spiritual aspect of life) was revealed by the first guru of Sikhism, Guru Nanak, but propounded by the sixth guru of Sikhism, Guru Hargobind, on 12 June 1606. After the martyrdom of his father, Guru Hargobind was elevated to the Guruship and fulfilled the prophecy that was given by the primal figure of Sikh, Baba Buddha, that the guru will possess spiritual and temporal power. Guru Hargobind introduced the two swords of Miri and Piri, symbolising both worldly (social and political) and spiritual authority. The two kirpan of Miri and Piri are tied together with a khanda in the centre, so the combination of both is considered supreme. This means that all action informed or arising out of the spiritual heart completes one's purpose and meaning in the world of action: spirituality.

Guru Nanak, the first Sikh guru and the founder of Sikhism, was a Bhakti saint. He taught that the most important form of worship is Bhakti (devotion to Waheguru). Guru Arjan, in the Sukhmani Sahib, recommended the true religion as one of loving devotion to God. The Guru Granth Sahib includes suggestions on how a Sikh should perform constant Bhakti. Some scholars call Sikhism a Bhakti sect of Indian traditions, adding that it emphasises "nirguni Bhakti", i.e. loving devotion to a divine without qualities or physical form. However, Sikhism also accepts the concept of saguni, i.e. a divine with qualities and form. While Western scholarship generally places Sikhism as arising primarily within a Hindu Bhakti movement milieu while recognising some Sufi Islamic influences, some Indian Sikh scholars disagree and state that Sikhism transcended the environment it emerged from. The basis of the latter analysis is that Bhakti traditions did not clearly disassociate from Vedic texts and their cosmologies and metaphysical worldview, while the Sikh tradition clearly did disassociate from the Vedic tradition.

Several Sikh sects outside the Punjab region of India, such as those found in Maharashtra and Bihar, practice aarti (the ceremonial use of lamps) during Bhakti observances in a Sikh gurdwara. However, most Sikh gurdwaras forbid aarti during their Bhakti practices. While emphasising Bhakti, the Sikh gurus also taught that the spiritual life and secular householder life are intertwined, and not separate. This logically follows from the panentheistic nature of Sikh philosophy. In Sikh worldview, the everyday world is part of the Infinite Reality, increased spiritual awareness leads to increased and vibrant participation in the everyday world. Guru Nanak described living an "active, creative, and practical life" of "truthfulness, fidelity, self-control and purity" as being higher than the metaphysical truth.

The sixth guru, Guru Hargobind, after Guru Arjan's martyrdom, faced oppression by the Islamic Mughal Empire and affirmed the philosophy that the political/temporal (Miri) and spiritual (Piri) realms are mutually coexistent. According to the ninth Sikh guru, Tegh Bahadur, the ideal Sikh should have both Shakti (power that resides in the temporal), and Bhakti (spiritual meditative qualities). This was developed into the concept of the "saint soldier" by the tenth Sikh guru, Gobind Singh.

The concept of humanity, as elaborated by Guru Nanak, refines and negates the "monotheistic concept of self/God", declaring that "monotheism becomes almost redundant in the movement and crossings of love". Sikh gurus have taught that the human's goal is to end all dualities of "self and other, I and not-I", attain the "attendant balance of separation-fusion, self-other, action-inaction, attachment-detachment, in the course of daily life".

=== Singing and music ===
Sikhs refer to the hymns of the gurus as Gurbani (lit. 'Guru's word'). Shabad Kirtan is the singing of Gurbani. The entire Guru Granth Sahib is written in the form of poetry and rhyme to be recited in thirty-one ragas of classical Indian music as specified. However, the exponents of these are rarely to be found amongst the Sikhs who are conversant with all the Ragas in the Guru Granth Sahib. Guru Nanak started the Shabad Kirtan tradition and taught that listening to kirtan is a powerful way to achieve tranquility while meditating, and singing of the glories of the "Supreme Timeless One" (God) with devotion is the most effective way to come in communion with the "Supreme Timeless One". The three morning prayers for Sikhs consist of Japji Sahib, Jaap Sahib, and Tav-Prasad Savaiye. Baptised Sikhs (Amritdharis) rise early and meditate, then recite all the Five Banis of Nitnem, before breakfast. The Five Banis consist of Japji Sahib, Jaap Sahib, Tav-Prasad Savaiye, Chaupai Sahib, and Anand Sahib; recitation of the banis paath is followed by Ardās, in which the Sarbat da Bhala principle is taught by gurus.

=== Remembrance of the Divine Name ===
A key practice by Sikhs is remembrance of the Naam (divine name), Waheguru. This contemplation is done through Nām Japō (repetition of the Divine Name) or Simran (remembrance of the Divine Name through recitation). The verbal repetition of the name of God—or a sacred syllable—is an established practice in religious traditions in India; however, Sikhism developed Naam-simran as an important Bhakti practice. Guru Nanak's ideal is the total exposure of one's being to the Divine Name and a conformation to Dharma, the "Divine Order". Nanak described the result of the disciplined application of nām simraṇ as a "growing towards and into God" through a gradual process of five stages. The last of these is Sach Khand (The Realm of Truth): the final union of the spirit with God.

=== Service and action ===
The Sikh gurus taught that by constantly remembering the divine name (naam simran) and through selfless service (sēvā), the devotee overcomes egotism (Haumai). This, it states, is the primary root of five evil impulses and the cycle of birth and death.

Service in Sikhism takes three forms: Tan (physical service, i.e. labour), Man (mental service, such as dedicating your heart for service of others), and Dhan (material service, including financial support). Sikhism stresses kirat karō, that is, "honest work". Sikh teachings also stress the concept of sharing, or vaṇḍ chakkō, giving to the needy for the benefit of the community.

=== Justice and equality ===
Sikhism regards God as the true emperor, the king of all kings, the one who dispenses justice through the law of karma, a retributive model and divine grace.

The term for justice in the Sikh tradition is Niāyā. It is related to the term dharam, which in Sikhism connotes 'moral order' and righteousness (derived, but distinct, from the etymologically related Hindu concept of dharma). According to the tenth Sikh guru, Guru Gobind Singh, states Pashaura Singh (a professor of Sikh studies), "one must first try all the peaceful means of negotiation in the pursuit of justice" and if these fail then it is legitimate to "draw the sword in defense of righteousness". Sikhism considers "an attack on dharam is an attack on justice, on righteousness, and on the moral order generally" and the dharam "must be defended at all costs". The divine name is its antidote for pain and vices. Forgiveness is taught as a virtue in Sikhism, yet it also teaches its faithful to shun those with evil intentions and to pick up the sword to fight injustice and religious persecution.

Sikhism does not differentiate religious obligations by sex. God in Sikhism has no sex, and the Sikh scripture does not discriminate against women, nor bar them from any roles. Women in Sikhism have been in positions of leadership, including leading in wars and issuing orders or hukamnamas.

=== Ten Gurus and authority ===
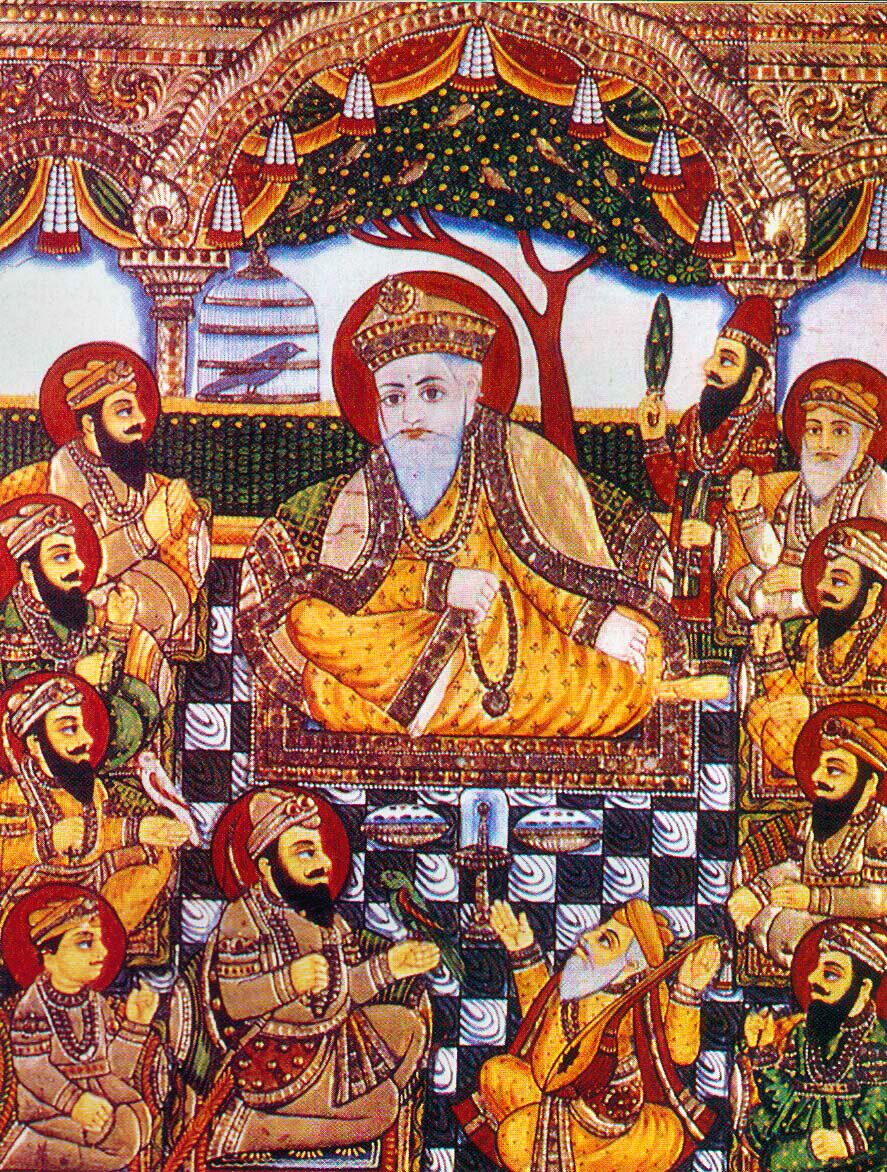
A rare Tanjore-style painting from the late 19th century depicting the ten Sikh Gurus with Bhai Bala and Bhai Mardana

The term "guru" is derived from the Sanskrit gurū, meaning teacher, enlightener, guide, or mentor. The traditions and philosophy of Sikhism were established by ten gurus from 1469 to 1708. Each guru added to and reinforced the message taught by the previous, resulting in the creation of the Sikh religion. Guru Nanak was the first guru and appointed a disciple as successor. Guru Gobind Singh was the final guru in human form. Before his death, Guru Gobind Singh decreed in 170, that the Gurū Granth Sāhib would be the final and perpetual guru of the Sikhs.

Guru Nanak stated that his guru is God, who is the same from the beginning of time to the end of time. Nanak said to be a God's slave and servant, but maintained that he was only a guide and teacher. Nanak stated that the human guru is mortal, who is to be respected and loved but not worshipped. When guru, or satguru (lit. 'the true guru') is used in Gurban,i, is often refers to the highest expression of truthfulness.

Guru Angad succeeded Guru Nanak. Later, an important phase in the development of Sikhism came with the third successor, Guru Amar Das. Guru Nanak's teachings emphasised the pursuit of salvation; Guru Amar Das began building a cohesive community of followers with initiatives such as sanctioning distinctive ceremonies for birth, marriage, and death. Amar Das also established the manji (comparable to a diocese) system of clerical supervision.

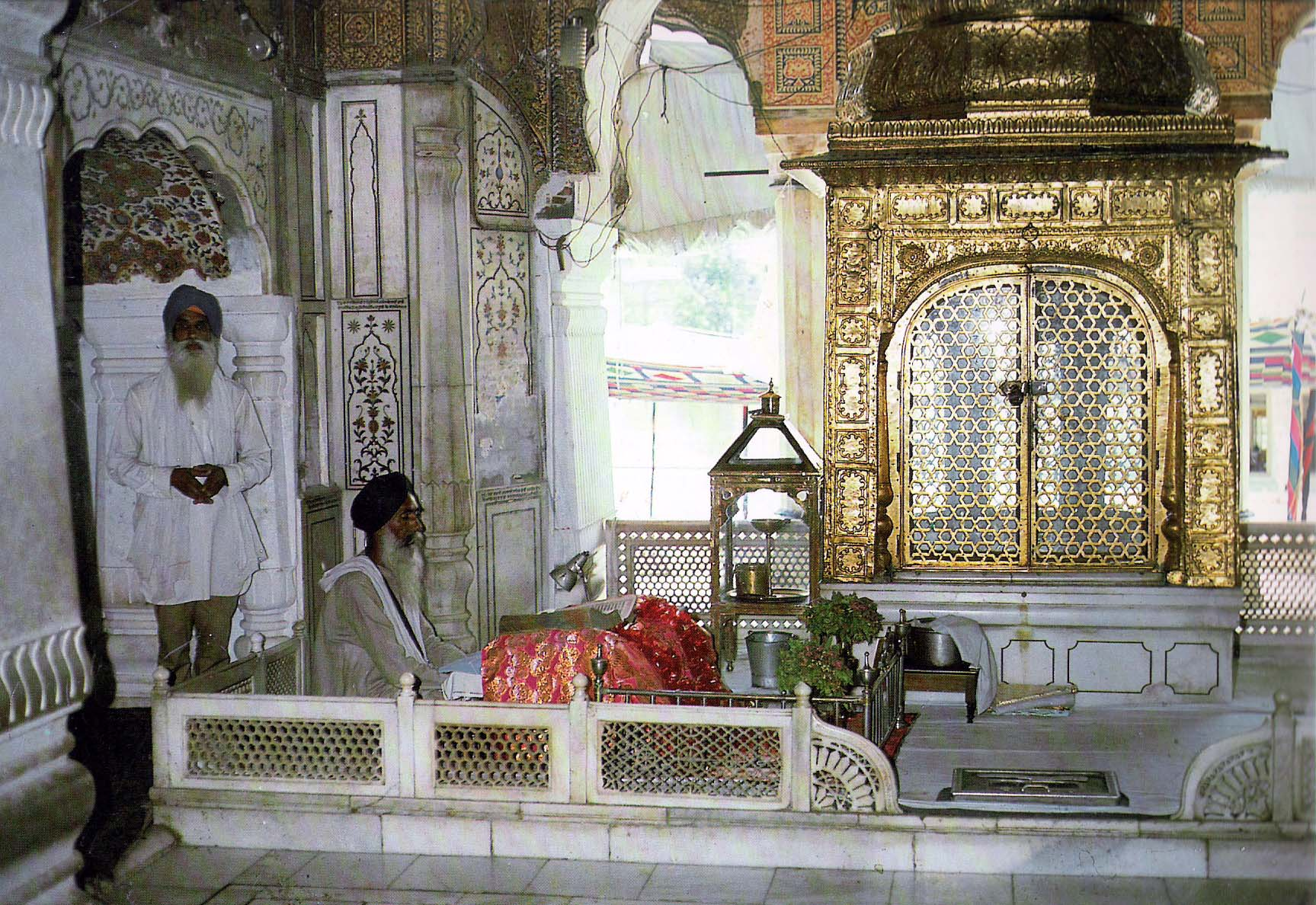
The interior of the Akal Takht

The Sikh gurus established a mechanism which allowed the Sikh religion to react as a community to changing circumstances. The sixth guru, Guru Hargobind, was responsible for the creation of the concept of Akal Takht (throne of the timeless one), which serves as the supreme decision-making centre of Sikhism and sits opposite the Harmandir Sahib. The Akal Takht is located in the city of Amritsar. The leader is appointed by the Shiromani Gurdwara Pabandhak Committee (SGPC). The Sarbat Ḵẖālsā (a representative portion of the Khalsa Panth) historically gathers at the Akal Takht on special festivals such as Vaisakhi or Hola Mohalla and when there is a need to discuss matters that affect the entire Sikh nation. A gurmatā (literally, 'guru's intention') is an order passed by the Sarbat Ḵẖālsā in the presence of the Gurū Granth Sāhib. A gurmatā may only be passed on a subject that affects the fundamental principles of Sikh religion; it is binding upon all Sikhs.

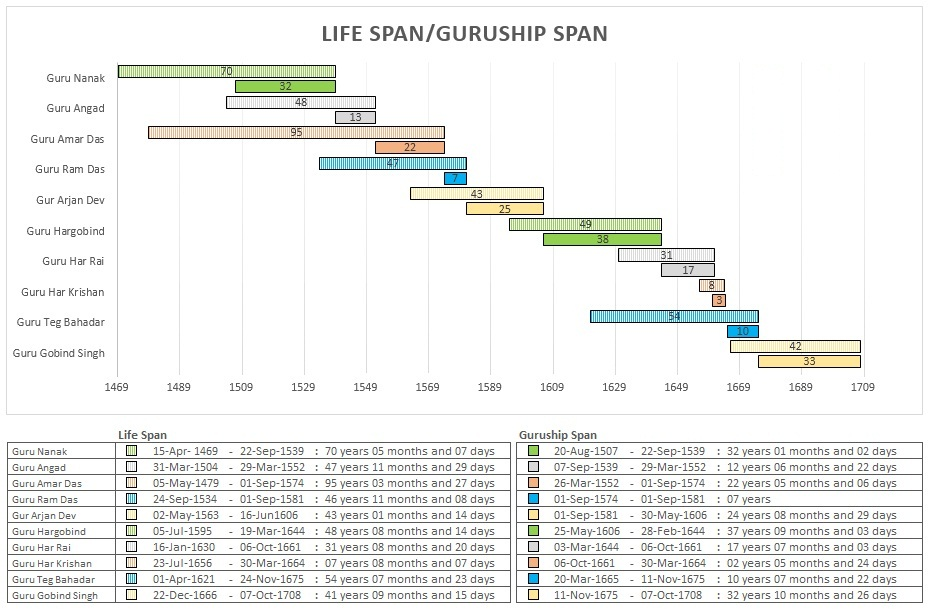
Approximate Life Spans and Guruship Spans of the 10 Sikh Gurus

The word guru in Sikhism also refers to Akal Purkh (God), and God and guru can sometimes be synonymous in Gurbani (Sikh writings).

== Scripture ==
There is one primary scripture for the Sikhs: the Guru Granth Sahib. It is sometimes synonymously referred to as the Ādi Granth. Chronologically, however, the Ādi Granth – literally, 'First Volume' – refers to the version of the scripture created by Guru Arjan in 1604. The Guru Granth Sahib is the final expanded version of the scripture compiled by Guru Gobind Singh. While the Guru Granth Sahib is an unquestioned scripture in Sikhism, another important religious text, the Dasam Granth, does not enjoy universal consensus, but is considered a secondary scripture by many Sikhs.

=== Ādi Granth ===
The Ādi Granth was compiled primarily by Bhai Gurdas under the supervision of Guru Arjan between the years 1603 and 1604. It is written in the Gurmukhī script, which is a descendant of the Laṇḍā script used in the Punjab at that time. The Gurmukhī script was standardised by Guru Angad, the second guru of the Sikhs, for use in the Sikh scriptures and is thought to have been influenced by the Śāradā and Devanāgarī scripts. An authoritative scripture was created to protect the integrity of hymns and teachings of the Sikh gurus, as well as thirteen Hindu and two Muslim bhagats of the Bhakti movement sant tradition in medieval India. The thirteen Hindu bhagats whose teachings were entered into the text included Ramananda, Namdev, Pipa, Ravidas, Beni, Bhikhan, Dhanna, Jaidev, Parmanand, Sadhana, Sain, Sur, Trilochan, while the two Muslim bhagats were Kabir and Sufi saint Farid. However, the bhagats in context often spoke of transcending their religious labels; Kabir, often attributed to being a Muslim, states in the Ādi Granth, "I am not Hindu nor Muslim." The gurus following this message taught that different methods of devotion are for the same infinite God. The Ādi Granth is an early draft of the Guru Granth Sahib.

=== Guru Granth Sahib ===
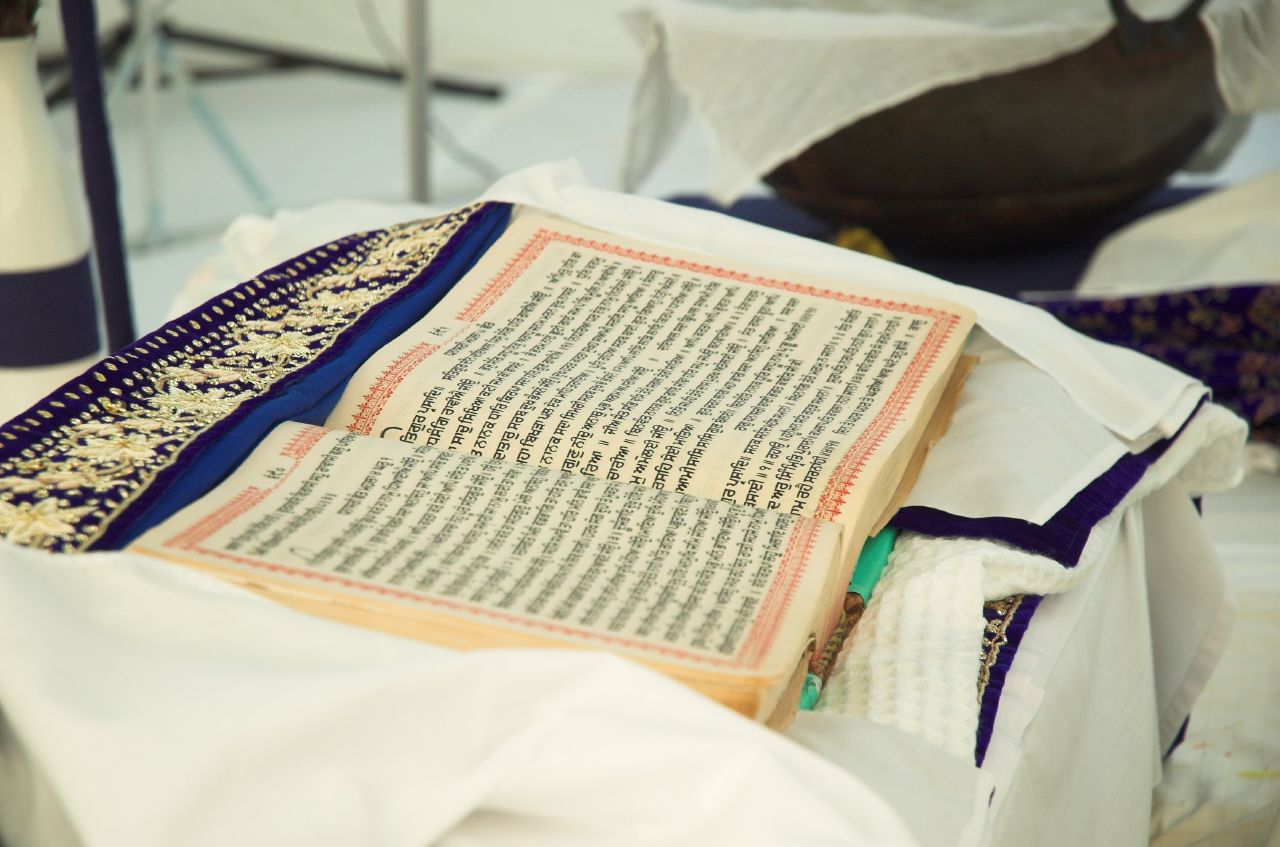
Gurū Granth Sāhib – the primary scripture of Sikhism

The Guru Granth Sahib is the holy scripture of the Sikhs and is regarded as the living guru.

==== Compilation ====
The Guru Granth Sahib started as a volume of Guru Nanak's poetic compositions. Prior to his death, he passed on his volume to the subsequent guru, Guru Angad. The final version of the Guru Granth Sahib was compiled by Guru Gobind Singh in 1678. It consists of the original Ādi Granth with the addition of Guru Tegh Bahadur's hymns. The predominant bulk of Guru Granth Sahib consists of compositions by seven Sikh gurus: Guru Nanak, Guru Angad, Guru Amar Das, Guru Ram Das, Guru Arjan, Guru Tegh Bahadur, and Guru Gobind Singh. It also contains the traditions and teachings of thirteen Hindu Bhakti movement sants (saints) such as Ramananda, Namdev, Sant kabir among others, and two Muslim saints: the Sufi Sheikh Farid.

The text comprises 6,000 śabads (line compositions), which are poetically rendered and set to rhythmic ancient north Indian classical music. The bulk of the scripture is classified into sixty rāgas, with each Granth rāga subdivided according to length and author. The hymns in the scripture are arranged primarily by the rāgas in which they are read.

==== Language and script ====
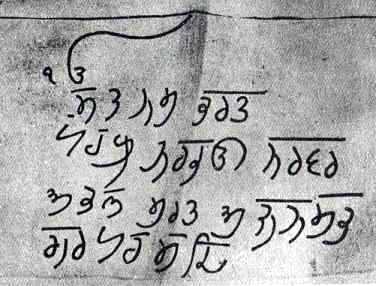
Mul Mantar written by Guru Har Rai, showing the Ik Onkar at top

The primary language used in the scripture is known as Sant Bhāṣā, a language related to both Punjabi and Hindi and used extensively across medieval northern India by proponents of popular devotional religion (bhakti). The text is printed in Gurumukhi script, believed to have been developed by Guru Angad. The language shares the Indo-European roots found in numerous regional languages of India.

==== Teachings ====
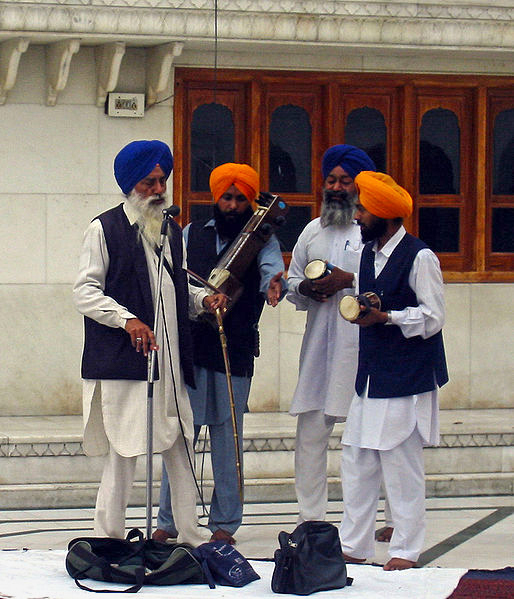
A group of Sikh musicians called Dhadi at the Golden Temple complex

The vision in the Guru Granth Sahib, states Torkel Brekke, is a society based on divine justice without oppression.

One God exists, truth by name, creative power, without fear, without enmity, timeless form, unborn, self-existent, by the guru's grace.
(Punjabi: ੴ ਸਤਿ ਨਾਮੁ ਕਰਤਾ ਪੁਰਖੁ ਨਿਰਭਉ ਨਿਰਵੈਰੁ ਅਕਾਲ ਮੂਰਤਿ ਅਜੂਨੀ ਸੈਭੰ ਗੁਰ ਪ੍ਰਸਾਦਿ ॥, romanised: Ika ōaṅkāra sati nāmu karatā purakhu nirabha'u niravairu akāla mūrati ajūnī saibhaṅ gura prasādi)

==== As guru ====
The tenth guru, Guru Gobind Singh, named the Sikh scripture Guru Granth Sahib as his successor, terminating the line of human gurus and making the scripture the literal embodiment of the eternal, impersonal guru, serving as the spiritual guide for Sikhs.

The Guru Granth Sahib is installed in all Sikh Gurdwaras (temples); many Sikhs bow or prostrate before it when entering the temple. The Guru Granth Sahib is installed every morning and put to bed at night in many Gurdwaras. The Granth is revered as eternal gurbānī and the spiritual authority.

The copies of the Guru Granth Sahib are not regarded as material objects but as living subjects. According to Myrvold, the Sikh scripture is treated with respect like a living person, in a manner similar to the Gospel in early Christian worship. Old copies of the Sikh scripture are not thrown away. Instead, funerary services are performed.

In India, the Guru Granth Sahib is officially recognised by the Supreme Court of India as a judicial person who can receive donations and own land. Yet, some Sikhs also warn that, without proper comprehension of the text, veneration for the text can lead to bibliolatry, with the concrete form of the teachings becoming the object of worship instead of the teachings themselves.

==== Distinction from other monotheistic religions ====
The Abrahamic religions do not deny the existence of spiritual beings such as angels, Satan (Iblis), and jinn under the one true God. However, Sikhism does not acknowledge the existence of such spiritual entities; it recognises only the one, formless, omnipotent, and omniscient God (Waheguru), emphasising the directness and oneness of God. Although Sikh scriptures mention angels, devas, Yama, and demons, these references are merely literary metaphors or borrowings, and are not regarded as descriptions of real, existing spiritual beings.

==== Relation to Hinduism and Islam ====
The Sikh scriptures use Hindu terminology, with references to the Vedas and the names of gods and goddesses in Hindu bhakti movement traditions, such as Vishnu, Shiva, Brahma, Parvati, Lakshmi, Saraswati, Rama, and Krishna, but not to worship. It also refers to the spiritual concepts in Hinduism (Ishvara, Bhagavan, Brahman) and the idea of God in Islam (Allah) to assert that these are just "alternate names for the Almighty One".

While the Guru Granth Sahib acknowledges the Vedas, Puranas and Quran, it does not imply a syncretic bridge between Hinduism and Islam, but emphasises focusing on nitnem banis like Japu (repeating mantra of the divine Name of God – Waheguru), instead of practices such as praying by prostrating on the ground to God towards a specific direction by Muslims, or Hindu rituals such as wearing thread; the former being, though, a disciplinary aspect of worship, given Dhikr (remembrance of Allah) is similarly emphasised in Islam.

=== Dasam Granth ===
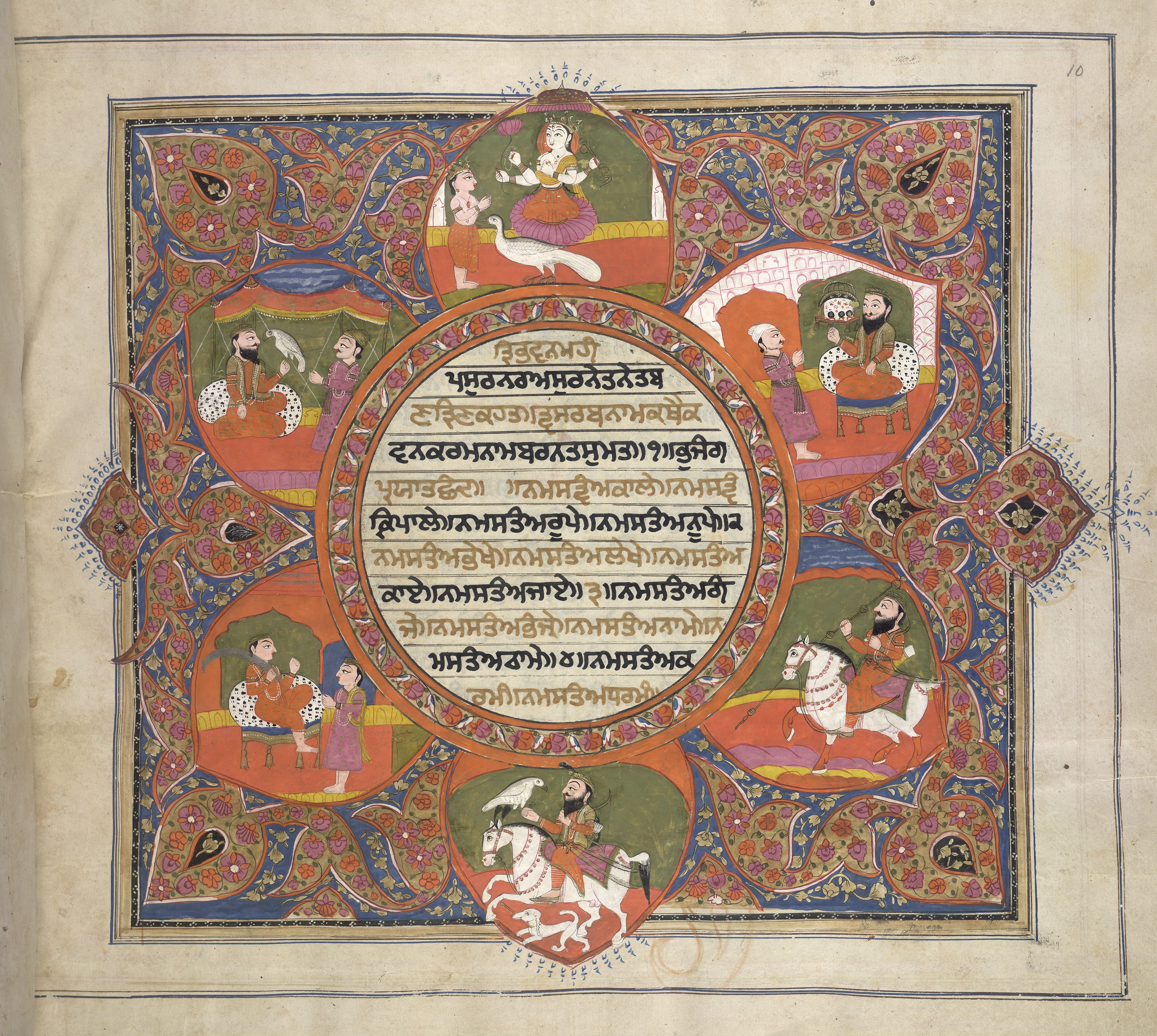
The Dasam Granth is a Sikh scripture which contains texts attributed to Guru Gobind Singh, including his autobiography Bachittar Natak. The major narrative in the text is on Chaubis Avtar (24 Avatars of Hindu god Vishnu), Rudra, Brahma, the Hindu warrior goddess Chandi and a story of Rama in Bachittar Natak.

The Dasam Granth is a Sikh scripture which contains texts attributed to Guru Gobind Singh. Scholars, on the other hand, attribute the work to after the guru's death, being authored by an unknown poet. The Dasam Granth is important to a great number of Sikhs. However, it does not have the same authority as the Guru Granth Sahib. Some compositions of the Dasam Granth like Jaap Sahib (Amrit Savaiye), and Benti Chaupai are part of the daily prayers (Nitnem) for Sikhs. The first verse of the ardās prayer is from Chandi di Var. The Dasam Granth is largely a version of Hindu mythology from the Puranas: secular stories from a variety of sources called Charitro Pakhyan—tales to protect careless men from the perils of lust.

Many versions of Dasam Granth exist, and the authenticity of the Dasam Granth has, in modern times, become one of the most debated topics within Sikhism. The Akali Nihangs consider the Dasam and Sarbloh Granth as extensions of the Guru Granth Sahib. The text played a significant role in Sikh history, but in modern times parts of the text have seen antipathy and discussion among Sikhs.

=== Sarbloh Granth ===
The Sarbloh Granth is a holy text containing 6,500 poetic stanzas traditionally attributed to Guru Gobind Singh. Scholars, on the other hand, attribute the work to after the guru's death, being authored by an unknown poet. This scripture contains, alongside various topics, the Sikh Art and Laws of War. Akali Nihangs largely revere this scripture, and many non-Nihang Sikhs reject it as an authentic work of the 10th Guru. According to Harbans Singh the authenticity of the work is rejected on the grounds of its writing style and mastery of poetry not matching up with Guru Gobind Singh's Dasam Granth work. Also, the text makes mention of a work composed in 1719, much after the death of Guru Gobind Singh. W. H. McLeod dates the work to the late 18th century and believes an unknown poet authored it, which was mistakenly attributed to the tenth guru.

=== Janamsakhis ===
The Janamsākhīs (literally birth stories) are writings that profess to be biographies of Guru Nanak. Although not scripture in the strictest sense, they provide a hagiographic look at Guru Nanak's life and the early start of Sikhism.

== Observances ==
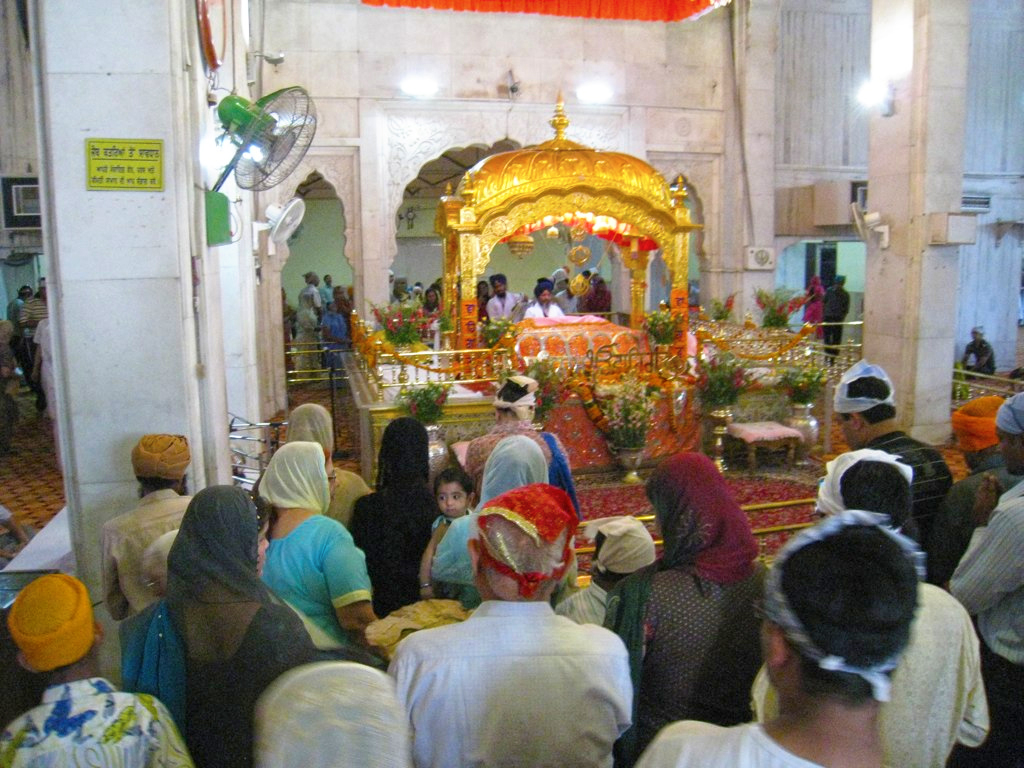
The Darbar Sahib of a Gurdwara

Observant Sikhs adhere to long-standing practices and traditions to strengthen and express their faith. The daily recitation of the divine name of God, Waheguru, and from memory of specific passages from the Guru Granth Sahib, like the Japu (or Japjī, literally chant) hymns, is recommended immediately after rising and bathing. Baptised Sikhs recite the five-morning prayers, the evening and night prayer. Family customs include both reading passages from the scripture and attending the gurdwara (also gurduārā, meaning the doorway to God; sometimes transliterated as Gurudwara). There are many gurdwaras prominently constructed and maintained across India, as well as in almost every country where Sikhs reside. Gurdwaras are open to all, regardless of religion, background, caste, or race.

Worship in a gurdwara consists chiefly of the singing of passages from the scripture. Sikhs will commonly prostrate before the holy scripture when entering a gurdwara. The recitation of the eighteenth-century ardās is also customary for attending Sikhs. The ardās recalls past sufferings and glories of the community, invoking divine grace for all humanity.

The gurdwara is also the location for the historic Sikh practice of langar or the community meal. All gurdwaras are open to anyone of any faith for a free meal, which is always vegetarian. People eat together, and the kitchen is maintained and serviced by Sikh community volunteers.

=== Sikh festivals/events ===
Guru Amar Das chose festivals for celebration by Sikhs like Vaisakhi, wherein he asked Sikhs to assemble and share the festivities as a community.

Vaisakhi is one of the most important festivals of Sikhs, while other significant festivals commemorate the birth and lives of the gurus and Sikh martyrs. Historically, these festivals have been based on the moon calendar Bikrami calendar. In 2003, the SGPC, the Sikh organisation in charge of upkeep of the historical gurdwaras of Punjab, adopted Nanakshahi calendar. The new calendar is highly controversial among Sikhs and is not universally accepted. Sikh festivals include the following:

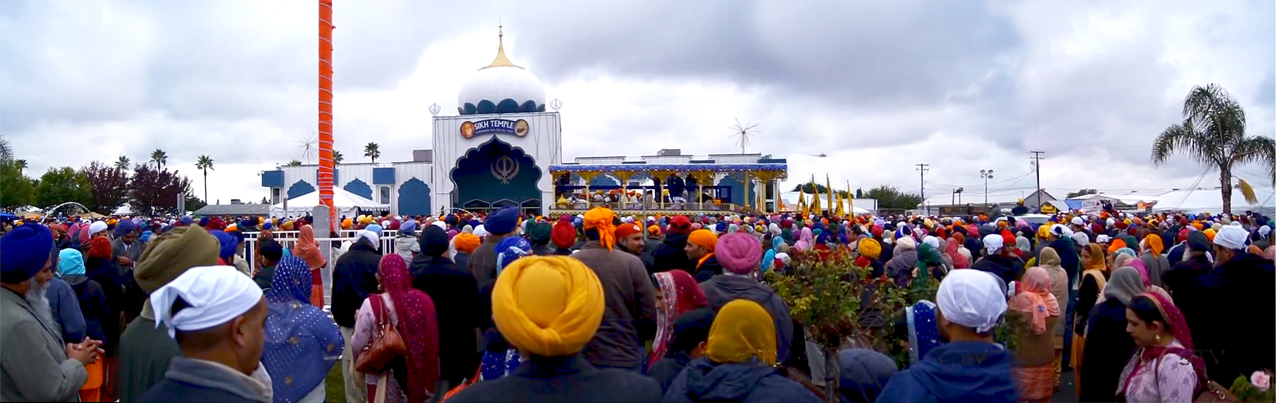
Nagar Kirtan crowd listening to Kirtan at Yuba City, California
- Band Chor Diwas has been another important Sikh festival in its history. In recent years, instead of Diwali, the post-2003 calendar released by SGPC has named it the Bandi Chhor Divas.
- Hola Mohalla is a tradition started by Guru Gobind Singh. It starts the day after Sikhs celebrate Holi, sometimes referred to as Hola. Guru Gobind Singh modified Holi with a three-day Hola Mohalla extension festival of martial arts. The extension started the day after the Holi festival in Anandpur Sahib, where Sikh soldiers would train in mock battles, compete in horsemanship, athletics, archery, and military exercises.

=== Ceremonies and customs ===
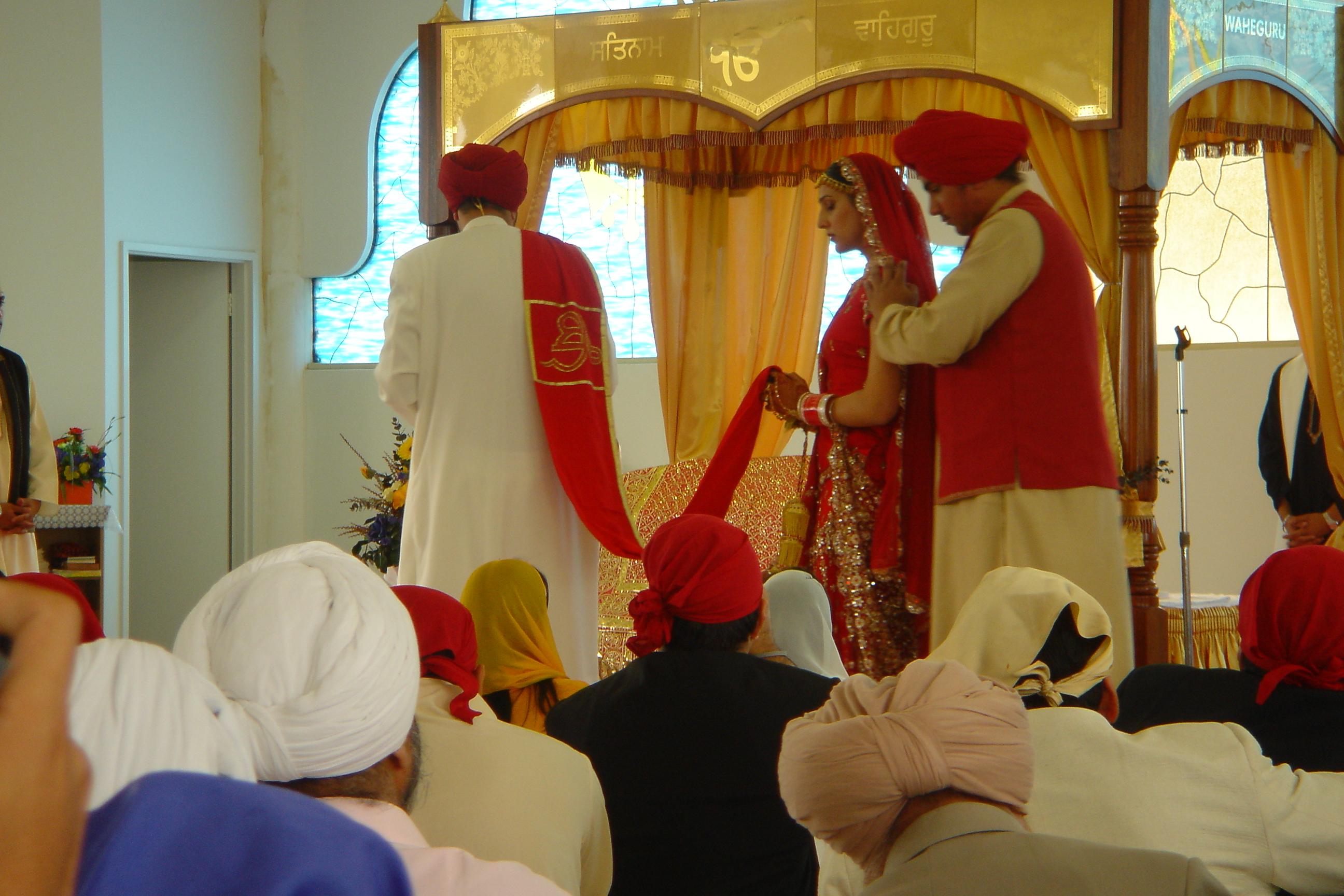
Sikh wedding

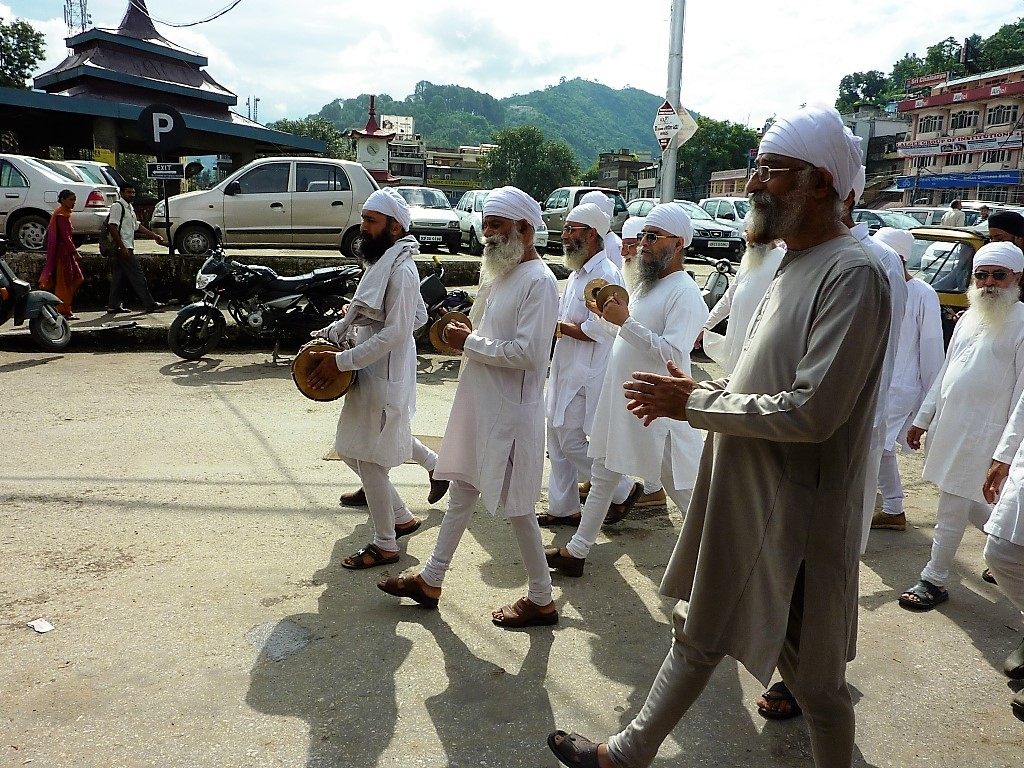
Sikh funeral procession, Mandi, Himachal Pradesh

Sikhs have also supported and helped develop major pilgrimage traditions to sacred sites such as Harmandir Sahib, Anandpur Sahib, Fatehgarh Sahib, Patna Sahib, Hazur Nanded Sahib, Hemkund Sahi,b and others. Sikh pilgrims and Sikhs of other sects customarily consider these as holy and a part of their Tirath. The Hola Mohalla around the festival of Holi, for example, is a ceremonial and customary gathering every year in Anandpur Sahib attracting over 100,000 Sikhs. Major Sikh temples feature a sarovar where some Sikhs take a customary dip. Some take home the sacred water of the tank,nk particularly for sick friends and relatives, believing that the waters of such sacred sites have restorative powers and the ability to purify one's karma. (Note: The Sikh scripture contains verses which have been literally interpreted as relevant to pilgrimage and taking dips in waters for salvific value; some criticise it (AG 358, 75); others support it (AG 623–624).) The various gurus of Sikhism have had different approaches to pilgrimage.

Upon a child's birth, the Guru Granth Sahib is opened at a random point, and the child is named using the first letter in the top-left corner of the left page. All boys are given the last name Singh, and all girls are given the last name Kaur (this was once a title which was conferred on an individual upon joining the Khalsa).

The Sikh marriage ritual includes the anand kāraj ceremony. The marriage ceremony is performed in front of the Guru Granth Sahib by a baptised Khalsa, Granthi of the Gurdwara. Its official recognition and adoption came in 1909, during the Singh Sabha Movement.

Upon death, the body of a Sikh is usually cremated. If this is not possible, any respectful means of disposing of the body may be employed. The kīrtan sōhilā and ardās prayers are performed during the funeral ceremony (known as antim sanskār).

=== Initiation and the Khalsa ===
Khalsa (meaning "pure and sovereign") is the collective name given by Guru Gobind Singh, to those Sikhs who have been fully initiated by taking part in a ceremony called ammrit sañcār (nectar ceremony). During this ceremony, sweetened water is stirred with a double-edged sword while liturgical prayers are sung; it is offered to the initiating Sikh, who ritually drinks it. Many Sikhs are not formally and fully initiated, as they do not undergo this ceremony, but do adhere to some components of Sikhism and identify as Sikhs. The initiated Sikh, who is believed to be reborn, is referred to as Amritdhari or Khalsa Sikh, while those who are not initiated or baptised are referred to as Kesdhari or Sahajdhari Sikhs.

The first time that this ceremony took place was on Vaisakhi, which fell on 30 March 1699 at Anandpur Sahib in Punjab. It was on that occasion that Gobind Singh baptised the Pañj Piārē – the five beloved ones, who in turn baptised Guru Gobind Singh himself. To males who were initiated, the last name Singh, meaning "lion", was given, while the last name Kaur, meaning "princess", was given to baptised Sikh females.

Baptised Sikhs wear five items, called the five Ks (in Punjabi known as pañj kakkē or pañj kakār), at all times. The five items are: kēs (uncut hair), kaṅghā (small wooden comb), kaṛā (circular steel or iron bracelet), kirpān (sword/dagger), and kacchera (special undergarment). The five Ks have both practical and symbolic purposes.

== History ==
Map of Punjab, where Sikhism originated, against present-day borders

Sikhism originated around the 15th century. Guru Nanak (1469–1539), the founder of Sikhism, was born in the village of Rāi Bhōi dī Talwandī, now called Nankana Sahib (in present-day Pakistan). His parents were Punjabi Khatri Hindus. According to the hagiography Puratan Janamsakhi composed more than two centuries after his death and probably based on oral tradition, Nanak as a boy was fascinated by religion and spiritual matters, spending time with wandering ascetics and holy men. His friend was Mardana, a Muslim. Together they would sing devotional songs all night in front of the public, and bathe in the river in the morning. One day, at the usual bath, Nanak went missing, and his family feared he had drowned. Three days later he returned home, and declared: "There is no Hindu, there is no Muslim" ("nā kōi hindū nā kōi musalmān"). Thereafter, Nanak started preaching his ideas that form the tenets of Sikhism. In 1526, Guru Nanak at age 50, started a small commune in Kartarpur and his disciples came to be known as Sikhs. Although the exact account of his itinerary is disputed, hagiographic accounts state he made five major journeys, spanning thousands of miles: the first tour being east towards Bengal and Assam; the second south towards Andhra and Tamil Nadu; the third north to Kashmir, Ladakh, and Mount Sumeru in Tibet; and the fourth to Baghdad. In his last and final tour, he returned to the banks of the Ravi River to end his days.

There are two competing theories on Guru Nanak's teachings. One, according to Cole and Sambhi, is based on hagiographical Janamsakhis, and states that Nanak's teachings and Sikhism were a revelation from God, and not a social protest movement nor any attempt to reconcile Hinduism and Islam in the 15th century. The other states that Nanak was a guru. According to Singha, "Sikhism does not subscribe to the theory of incarnation or the concept of prophethood. But it has a pivotal concept of Guru. He is not an incarnation of God, not even a prophet. He is an illumined soul." The second theory continues that hagiographical Janamsakhis were not written by Nanak, but by later followers without regard for historical accuracy, and contain numerous legends and myths created to show respect for Nanak. The term revelation, clarify Cole and Sambhi, in Sikhism is not limited to the teachings of Nanak, but is extended to all Sikh gurus, as well as the words of past, present and future men and women, who possess divine knowledge intuitively through meditation. The Sikh revelations include the words of non-Sikh bhagats, some who lived and died before the birth of Nanak, and whose teachings are part of the Sikh scriptures. The Adi Granth and successive Sikh gurus repeatedly emphasised, states Mandair, that Sikhism is "not about hearing voices from God, but it is about changing the nature of the human mind, and anyone can achieve direct experience and spiritual perfection at any time".

=== Historical influences ===
Sikhism arose in predominantly an Indic milieu with some Islamic influence, with it being especially influenced by the Sant tradition. The roots of the Sikh tradition are, states Louis Fenech, perhaps in the Sant-tradition of India whose ideology grew to become the Bhakti tradition. (Note: "Technically this would place the Sikh community's origins at a much further remove than 1469, perhaps to the dawning of the Sant movement, which possesses clear affinities to Guru Nanak's thought sometime in the tenth century. The predominant ideology of the Sant parampara in turn corresponds in many respects to the much wider devotional Bhakti tradition in northern India. (Pashaura and Fenech 2014, p. 35).) Furthermore, adds Fenech:

Few Sikhs would mention these Indic texts and ideologies in the same breadth as the Sikh tradition, let alone trace elements of their tradition to this chronological and ideological point, despite the fact that the Indic mythology permeates the Sikh sacred canon, the Guru Granth Sahib, and the secondary canon, the Dasam Granth ... and adds delicate nuance and substance to the sacred symbolic universe of the Sikhs of today and of their past ancestors.

The development of Sikhism was influenced by the Bhakti movement; (Note: "Historically, Sikh religion derives from this nirguni current of bhakti religion." (Lorenzen 1995, pp. 1–2).) (Note: "In its earliest stage Sikhism was clearly a movement within the Hindu tradition; Nanak was raised a Hindu and eventually belonged to the Sant tradition of northern India." (McLeod 2019/1998).) however, Sikhism was not simply an extension of the Bhakti movement. Sikhism, for instance, disagreed with some of the views of Bhakti saints Kabir and Ravidas. (Note: These views include Sikhs believing in achieving blissful mukhti while alive, Sikhs placing emphasis on the path of the householder, Sikhs' disbelief in Ahinsa, and theSikhs's afterlife aspect of merging with God rather than a physical heaven.) Other historical influences on the development of Sikhism were Sant Mat, Vaishnavism (especially via the Bhakti movement), and Sufism. However, Sikhism differs from Vaishnavist theology with regard to idolatry, incarnation, and the Sikhs' heavy emphasis on inward devotion. Sikhs hold that their religion was directly inspired by God, and some take offence at the claim that it is a syncretic religion incorporating Hinduism and Islam. Scholar James R. Lewis has criticized this syncretic approach and understanding of the religion. Sikhism developed while the region was being ruled by the Mughal Empire. Two of the Sikh gurus, Guru Arjan and Guru Tegh Bahadur, refused to convert to Islam and were tortured and executed by the Mughal rulers. The Islamic-era persecution of Sikhs triggered the founding of the Khalsa, as an order for freedom of conscience and religion. A Sikh is expected to embody the qualities of a "Sant-Sipāhī" – a saint-soldier.

=== Growth of Sikhism ===
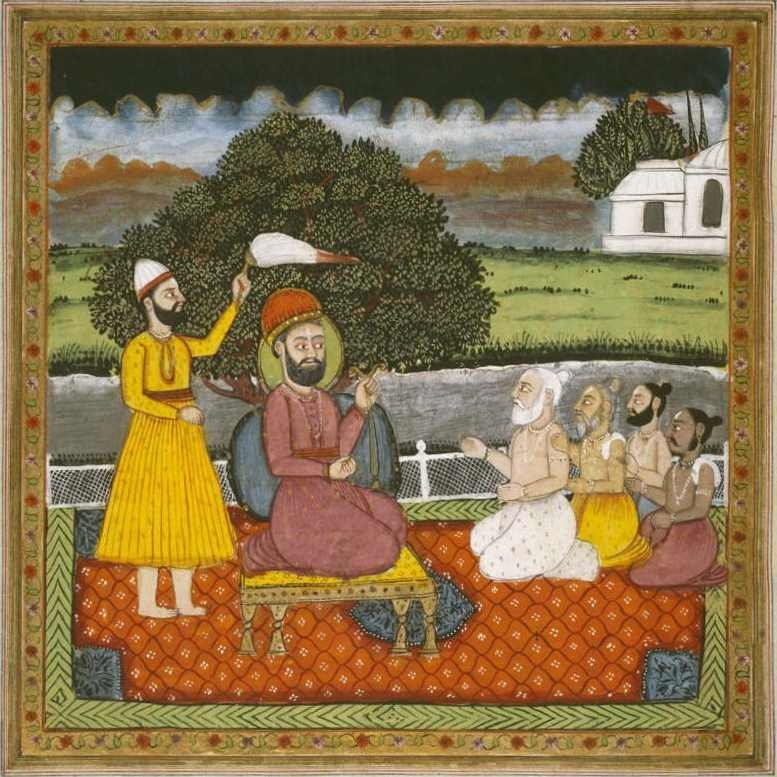
Guru Nanak explaining Sikh teachings to Sadhus

After its inception, Sikhism grew as it gained converts among Hindus and Muslims in the Punjab region. In 1539, Guru Nanak chose his disciple Lahiṇā as a successor to the Guruship rather than either of his sons. Lahiṇā was named Guru Angad and became the second guru of the Sikhs. Nanak conferred his choice at the town of Kartarpur on the banks of the river Ravi. Sri Chand, Guru Nanak's son, was also a religious man, and continued his own commune of Sikhs. His followers came to be known as the Udasi Sikhs, the first parallel sect of Sikhism that formed in Sikh history. The Udasis believe that the Guruship should have gone to Sri Chand, since he was a man of pious habits in addition to being Nanak's son.

Guru Angad, before joining Guru Nanak's commune, worked as a pujari (priest) and religious teacher centred around the Hindu goddess Durga. On Nanak's advice, Guru Angad moved from Kartarpur to Khadur, where his wife Khivi and children were living, until he was able to bridge the divide between his followers and the Udasis. Guru Angad continued the work started by Guru Nanak and is widely credited with standardising the Gurmukhī script as used in the sacred scripture of the Sikhs.

Guru Amar Das became the third Sikh guru in 1552 at the age of 73. He adhered to the Vaishnavism tradition of Hinduism for much of his life, before joining the commune of Guru Angad. Goindval became an important centre for Sikhism during the Guruship of Guru Amar Das. He was a reformer and discouraged veiling of women's faces (a Muslim custom) as well as sati (a Hindu custom). He encouraged the Kshatriya people to fight in order to protect people and for the sake of justice, stating this is Dharma. Guru Amar Das started the tradition of appointing manji (zones of religious administration with an appointed chief called sangatias), introduced the dasvandh (tithe) system of revenue collection in the name of guru and as pooled community religious resource, and the famed langar tradition of Sikhism where anyone, without discrimination of any kind, could get a free meal in a communal seating. The collection of revenue from Sikhs through regional appointees helped Sikhism grow.

Guru Amar Das named his disciple and son-in-law Jēṭhā as the next guru, who came to be known as Guru Ram Das. The new guru faced hostilities from the sons of Guru Amar Das and therefore shifted his official base to lands identified by Guru Amar Das as Guru-ka-Chak. He moved his commune of Sikhs there and the place then was called Ramdaspur, after him. This city grew and later became Amritsar – the holiest city of Sikhism. Guru Ram Das expanded the manji organisation for clerical appointments in Sikh temples, and for revenue collections to theologically and economically support the Sikh movement.

In 1581, Guru Arjan, the youngest son of Guru Ram Das, became the fifth guru of the Sikhs. The choice of successor, as throughout most of the history of Sikh guru successions, led to disputes and internal divisions among the Sikhs. The elder son of Guru Ram Das named Prithi Chand is remembered in the Sikh tradition as vehemently opposing Guru Arjan, creating a faction Sikh community which the Sikhs following Guru Arjan called as Minaas (literally, "scoundrels").

Guru Arjan is remembered among Sikhs for many accomplishments. He built the first Harimandir Sahib (later to become the Golden Temple). He was a poet, and he created the first edition of the Sikh sacred text known as the Ādi Granth (literally "the first book") and included the writings of the first five gurus and other enlightened 13 Hindu and 2 Muslim Sufi saints. In 1606, he was tortured and killed by the Mughal emperor Jahangir, for refusing to convert to Islam. His martyrdom is considered a watershed event in the history of Sikhism.

=== Political advancement ===
After the martyrdom of Guru Arjan, his son Guru Hargobind at age eleven became the sixth guru of the Sikhs, and Sikhism dramatically evolved to become a political movement in addition to being religious. Guru Hargobind carried two swords, calling one spiritual and the other for temporal purpose, reflecting the concept of Miri Piri. According to the Sikh tradition, Guru Arjan asked his son Hargobind to start a military tradition to protect the Sikh people and always keep himself surrounded by armed Sikhs. The building of an armed Sikh militia began with Guru Hargobind. Guru Hargobind was soon arrested by the Mughals and kept in jail in Gwalior. It is unclear how many years he served in prison, with different texts stating it to be between 2 and 12. He married three women, built a fort to defend Ramdaspur and created a formal court called Akal Takht, now the highest Khalsa Sikh religious authority.

In 1644, Guru Hargobind named his grandson Har Rai as the guru. The Mughal emperor Shah Jahan attempted political means to undermine the Sikh tradition by dividing and influencing the succession. The Mughal ruler gave land grants to Dhir Mal, a grandson of Guru Hargobind living in Kartarpur, and attempted to encourage Sikhs to recognise Dhir Mal as the rightful successor to Guru Hargobind. Dhir Mal issued statements in favour of the Mughal state and critical of his grandfather Guru Arjan. Guru Hargobind rejected Dhir Mal; the latter refused to give up the original version of the Adi Granth he had, and the Sikh community was divided.

Guru Har Rai is famed to have met Dara Shikoh during a time when Dara Shikoh and his younger brother Aurangzeb were in a bitter succession fight. Aurangzeb summoned Guru Har Rai, who refused to go and sent his elder son Ram Rai instead. The emperor found a verse in the Sikh scripture insulting to Muslims, and Ram Rai agreed it was a mistake, then changed it. Ram Rai thus pleased Aurangzeb, but displeased Guru Har Rai,i who excommunicated his elder son. He nominated his younger son Guru Har Krishan to succeed him in 1661. Aurangzeb responded by granting Ram Rai a jagir (land grant). Ram Rai founded a town there and enjoyed Aurangzeb's patronage; the town came to be known as Dehradun, after Dehra referring to Ram Rai's shrine. Sikhs who followed Ram Rai came to be known as Ramraiya Sikhs. Guru Har Krishan became the eighth guru at the age of five, and died of smallpox before reaching the age of eight. No hymns composed by these three gurus are included in the Guru Granth Sahib.

Guru Tegh Bahadur, the uncle of Guru Hargobind, became guru in 1665. Tegh Bahadur resisted the forced conversions of Kashmiri Pandits and non-Muslims to Islam, and was publicly beheaded in 1675 on the orders of Mughal emperor Aurangzeb in Delhi for refusing to convert to Islam. His beheading traumatised the Sikhs. His body was cremated in Delhi, while the head was carried secretly by Sikhs and cremated in Anandpur. He was succeeded by his son, Gobind Rai, who militarised his followers by creating the Khalsa in 1699, and baptising the Pañj Piārē. From then on, he was known as Guru Gobind Singh, and Sikh identity was redefined into a political force resisting religious persecution.

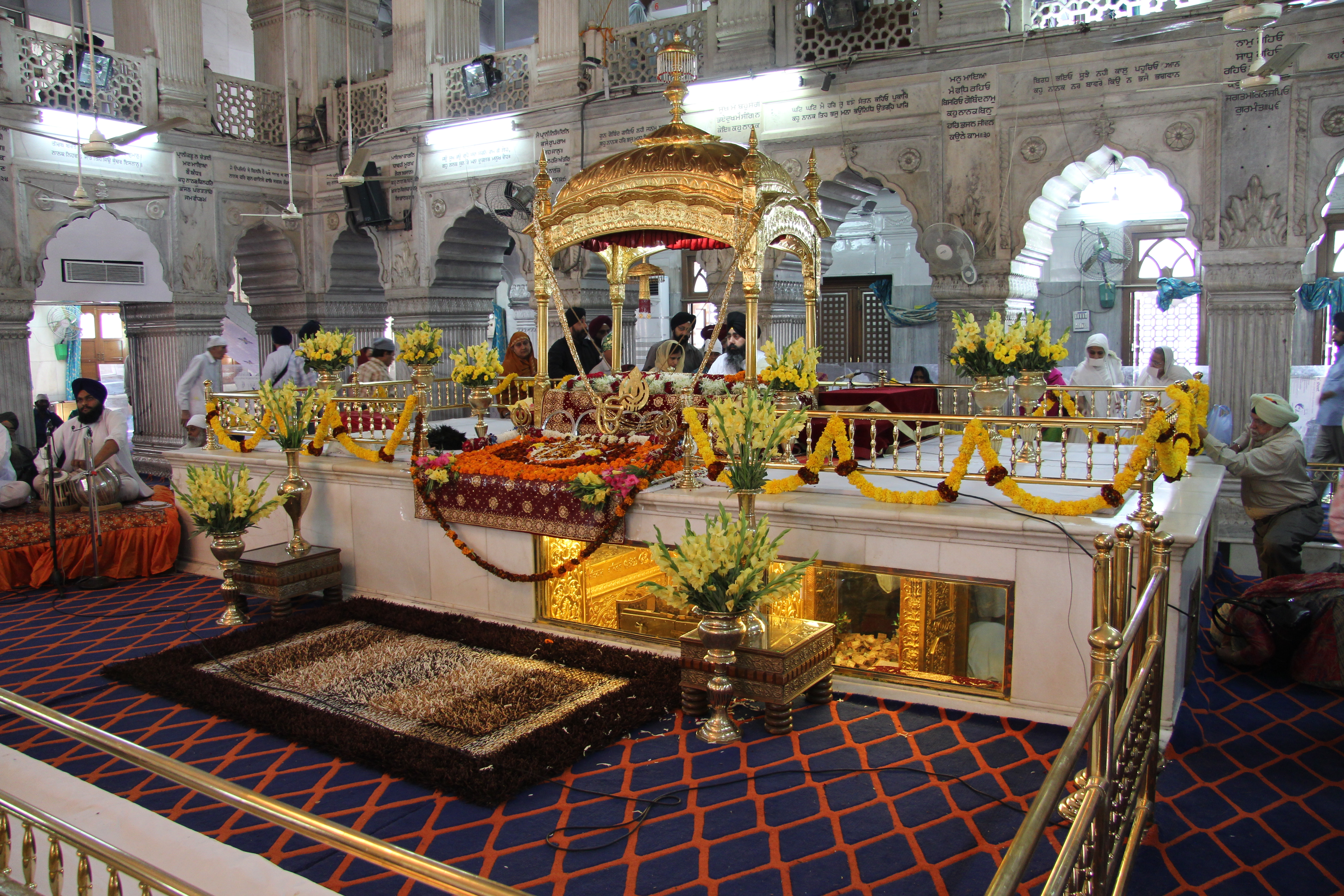
Gurudwara Sis Ganj Sahib in Delhi. The long window under the marble platform is the location where Guru Tegh Bahadur was executed by the Mughals.

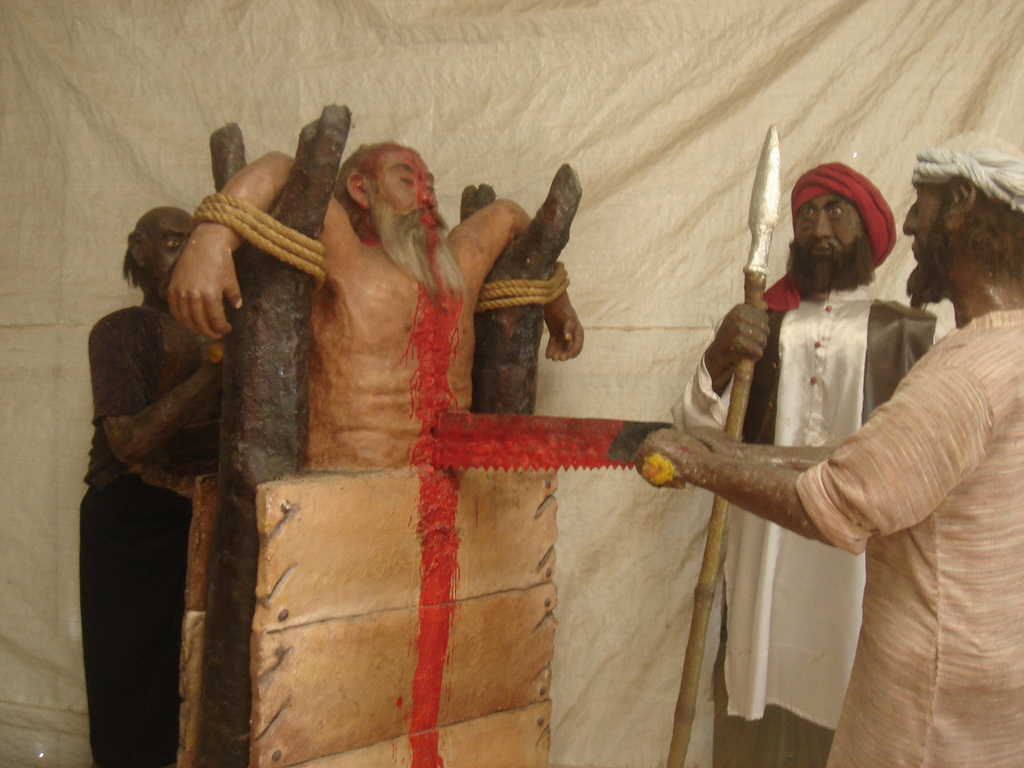
Artistic rendering of the execution of Bhai Mati Das by the Mughals. This image is from a Sikh Ajaibghar near the towns of Mohali and Sirhind in Punjab, India.

==== Sikh confederacy and the rise of the Khalsa ====
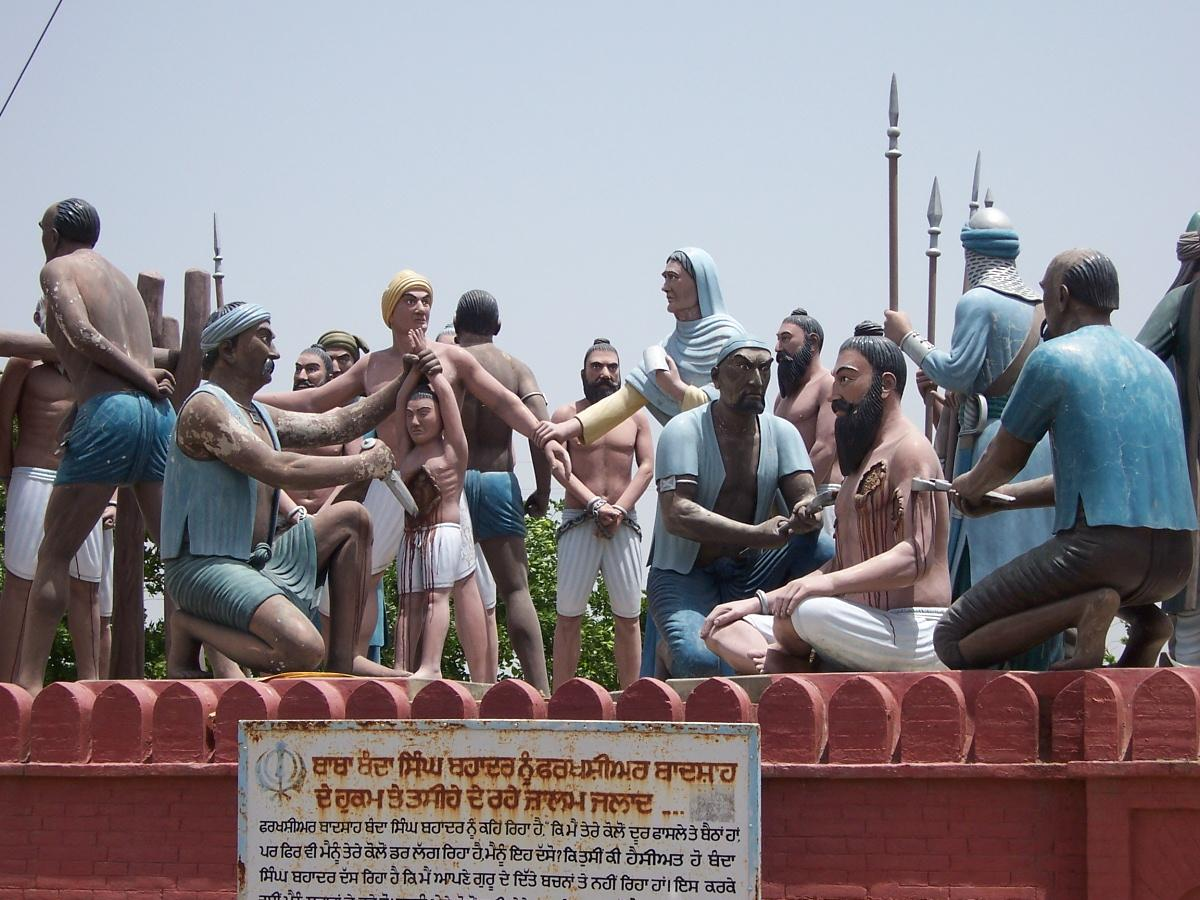
Sculpture at Mehdiana Sahib of the execution of Banda Singh Bahadur in 1716 by the Mughals

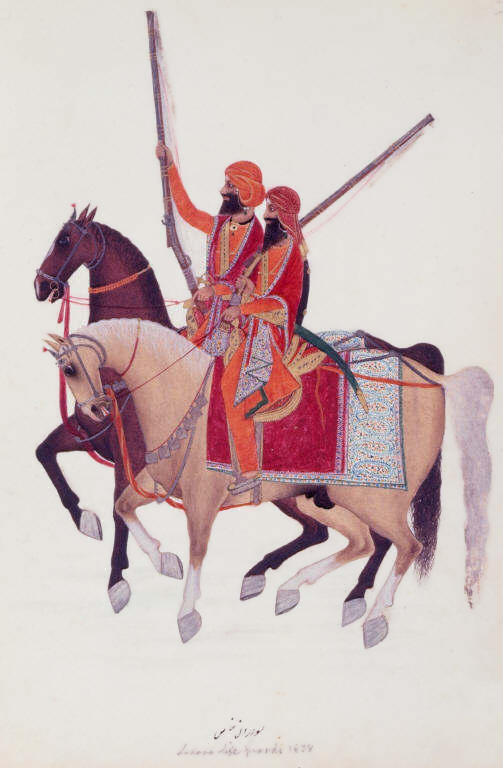
Some bodyguards of Maharaja Ranjit Singh at the Sikh capital, Lahore, Punjab

Guru Gobind Singh inaugurated the Khalsa (the collective body of all initiated Sikhs) as the Sikh temporal authority in the year 1699. It created a community that combines its spiritual purpose and goals with political and military duties. Shortly before his death, Guru Gobind Singh proclaimed the Guru Granth Sahib to be the ultimate spiritual authority for the Sikhs.

After the Guru Gobind's death, Banda Singh Bahadur became the commander-in-chief of the Khalsa. He organised the civilian rebellion and abolished or halted the Zamindari system in time he was active and gave the farmers proprietorship of their own land.

The Sikh empire, with its capital in Lahore, spread over almost 200,000 square miles (520,000 square kilometres) comprising what is now northwestern Indian subcontinent. The Sikh Empire entered into a treaty with the colonial British powers, with each side recognising the Sutlej River as the line of control and agreeing not to invade the other side. Ranjit Singh's most lasting legacy was the restoration and expansion of the Harmandir Sahib, most revered Gurudwara of the Sikhs, with marble and gold, from which the popular name of the "Golden Temple" is derived. After the death of Ranjit Singh in 1839, the Sikh Empire fell into disorder. Ranjit Singh had failed to establish a lasting structure for Sikh government or stable succession, and the Sikh Empire rapidly declined after his death. Factions divided the Sikhs and led to the Anglo-Sikh Wars. The British defeated the confused and demoralised Khalsa forces, then disbanded them into destitution. The youngest son of Ranjit Singh, named Duleep Singh, ultimately succeeded, but he was arrested and exiled after the defeat of the Sikhs.

==== Singh Sabha movement ====
The Singh Sabha movement, a movement to revitalise Sikhism, also saw the resurgence of the Khalsa after their defeat in wars with the British – latterly in the Second Anglo-Sikh War – and the subsequent decline and corruption of Sikh institutions during colonial rule, and the proselytisation of other faith groups in the Punjab. It was started in the 1870s, and after a period of interfactional rivalry, united under the Tat Khalsa to reinvigorate Sikh practice and institutions.

The last Maharaja of the Sikh Empire, Duleep Singh, converted to Christianity in 1853, a controversial but influential event in Sikh history. Along with his conversion, and after the Sikh Empire had been dissolved and the region made a part of the colonial British Empire, proselytising activities of Christians, Brahmo Samaj, Arya Samaj, Muslim Anjuman-i-Islamia, and Ahmadiyah sought to convert the Sikhs in the northwestern Indian subcontinent into their respective faiths. These developments launched the Singh Sabha Movement.

The first meeting of the movement was in the Golden Temple, Amritsar, in 1873, and it was largely launched by the Sanatan Sikhs, Gianis, priests, and granthis. Shortly thereafter, Nihang Sikhs began influencing the movement, followed by a sustained campaign by the Tat Khalsa, which had quickly gained dominance by the early 1880s. The movement became a struggle between Sanatan Sikhs and Tat Khalsa in defining and interpreting Sikhism.

Sanatan Sikhs led by Khem Singh Bedi – who claimed to be a direct descendant of Guru Nanak, Avtar Singh Vahiria and others supported a more inclusive approach which considered Sikhism as a reformed tradition of Hinduism, while Tat Khalsa campaigned for an exclusive approach to the Sikh identity, disagreeing with Sanatan Sikhs and seeking to modernise Sikhism. The Sikh Sabha movement expanded in north and northwest Indian subcontinent, leading to more than 100 Singh Sabhas. By the early decades of the 20th century, the influence of Tat Khalsa increased in interpreting the nature of Sikhism and their control over the Sikh gurdwaras. The Tat Khalsa banished Brahmanical practices including the use of the yagna fire, replaced by the Anand Karaj marriage ceremony in accordance with Sikh scripture, and the idols and the images of Sikh gurus from the Golden Temple in 1905, traditions which had taken root during the administration of the mahants during the 1800s. They undertook a sustained campaign to standardise how Sikh gurdwaras looked and ran, while looking to Sikh scriptures and the early Sikh tradition to purify the Sikh identity.

The spiritual successors of the Singh Sabha include the Akali movement of the 1920s, as well as the modern-day Shiromani Gurdwara Parbandhak Committee (SGPC), a gurdwara administration body, and the Akali Dal political party.

==== Partition of India ====
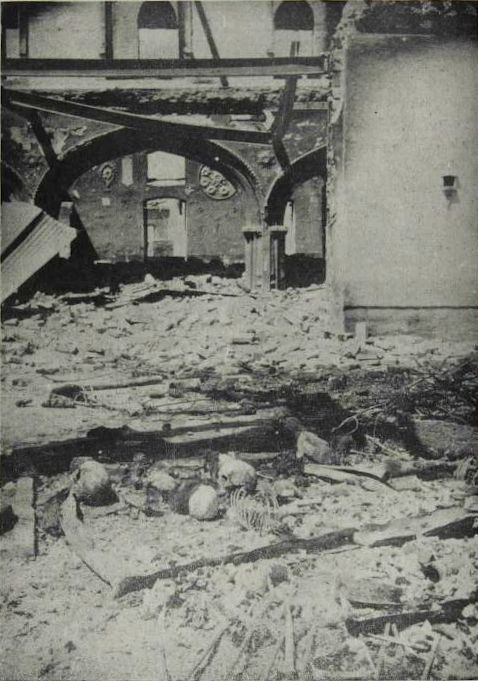
Demolished Gurudwara with partially burnt skeletal remains of victims lying on the floor, in the aftermath of the Rawalpindi Massacres of March 1947, which preceded the partition and were the first partition-related violence in Punjab to show clear signs of ethnic cleansing

Sikhs participated and contributed to the decades-long Indian independence movement in the first half of the 20th century. Ultimately, when the British Empire recognised independent India, the land was partitioned into Hindu-majority India and Muslim-majority Pakistan (East and West) in 1947. According to Banga, the partition was a watershed event in Sikh history. The Sikhs had historically lived in northwestern region of Indian subcontinent on both sides of the partition line ("Radcliffe Line"). According to Banga and other scholars, the Sikhs had strongly opposed the Muslim League demands and saw it as "perpetuation of Muslim domination" and anti-Sikh policies in what, just a hundred years before, was a part of the Sikh Empire. As such, Sikh organisations, including the Chief Khalsa Dewan and Shiromani Akali Dal led by Master Tara Singh, condemned the Lahore Resolution and the movement to create Pakistan, viewing it as inviting possible persecution; the Sikhs thus largely strongly opposed the partition of India. During the discussions with the colonial authorities, Tara Singh emerged as an important leader who campaigned to prevent the partition of colonial India and for the recognition of Sikhs as a third community.

When partition was announced, the newly created line divided the Sikh population. Along with Hindus, Sikhs suffered organised violence and riots against them in West Pakistan. As a result, Sikhs moved en masse to the Indian side, leaving behind their property and holy sites. However, the anti-Sikh violence was not one-sided. As Sikhs moved to the eastern side of the partition line, they engaged in reprisals against Muslims there, forcing them into Pakistan. Before the partition, Sikhs constituted about 15% of the population in West Punjab, the majority being Muslims (55%). The Sikhs were the economic elite in West Punjab, however. They had the largest representation in West Punjab's aristocracy, and there were nearly 700 Gurdwaras and 400 educational institutions that served the interests of the Sikhs. Prior to the partition, there were a series of disputes between the majority Muslims and minority Sikhs, such as on the matters of jhatka versus halal meat, the disputed ownership of Gurdwara Sahidganj in Lahore which Muslims sought as a mosque and Sikhs as a Gurdwara, and the insistence of the provincial Muslim government on switching from Indian Gurmukhi script to Arabic-Persian Nastaliq script in schools. During and after the Simla Conference in June 1945, headed by Lord Wavell, the Sikh leaders initially expressed their desire to be recognised as a third community, but ultimately relegated these demands and sought a United India where Sikhs, Hindus and Muslims would live together, under a Swiss-style constitution. The Muslim League rejected this approach, demanding that the entire Punjab should be granted to Pakistan. The Sikh leaders then sought the original partition instead, and the Congress Working Committee passed a resolution in support of partitioning Punjab and Bengal.

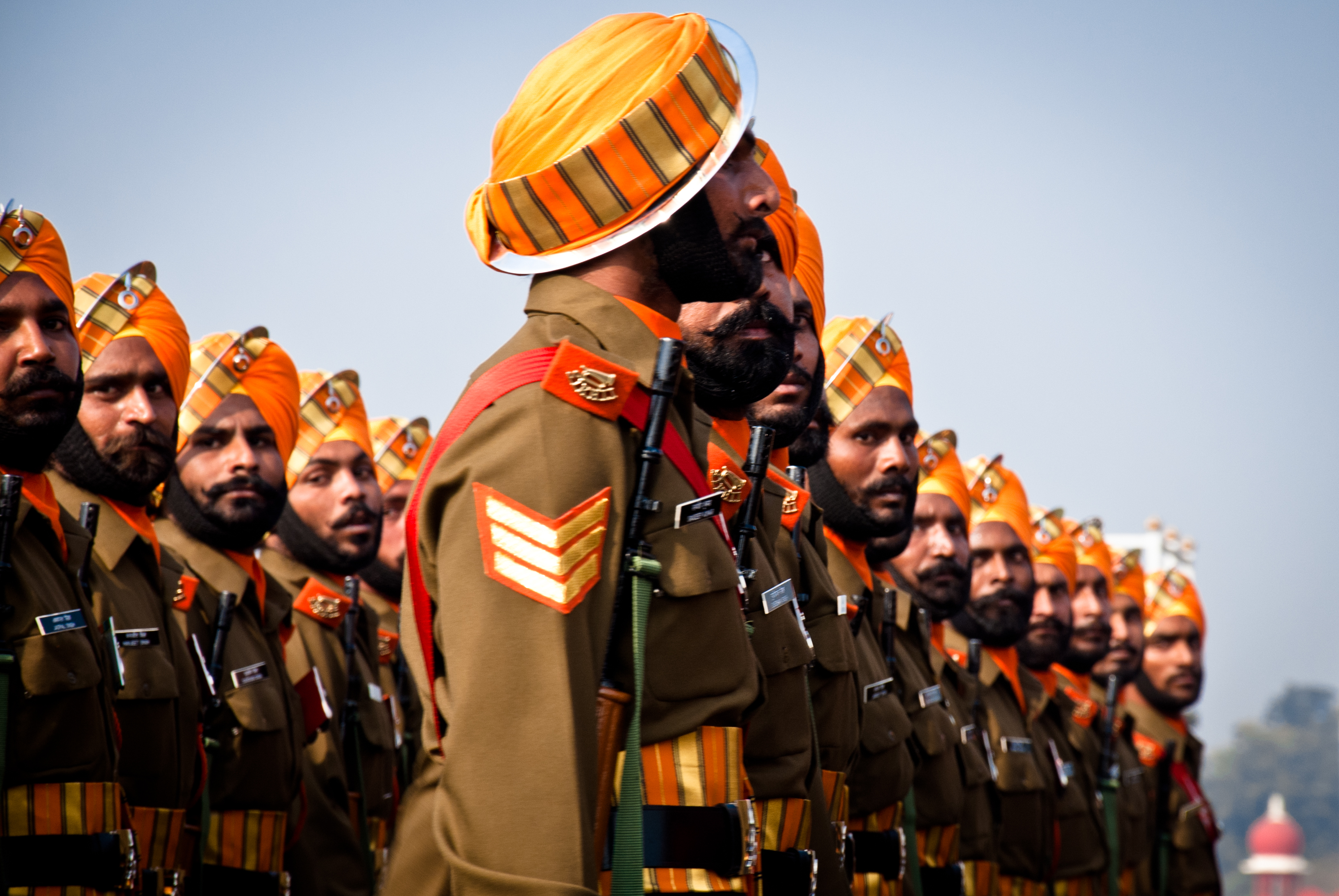
Sikh Light Infantry personnel march past during the Republic day parade in New Delhi, India.

Between March and August 1947, a series of riots, arson, plunder of Sikh property, assassination of Sikh leaders, and killings in Jhelum district, Rawalpindi, Attock, and other places led to Tara Singh calling the situation in Punjab a "civil war", while Lord Mountbatten stated, "civil war preparations were going on." The riots had triggered the early waves of migration in April, with some 20,000 people leaving northwest Punjab and moving to Patiala. In Rawalpindi, 40,000 people became homeless. The Sikh leaders made desperate petitions, but all religious communities were suffering in the political turmoil. Sikhs constituted only 4 million out of a total of 28 million in Punjab, and 6 million out of nearly 400 million in India; they did not constitute the majority, not even in a single district.

When the partition line was formally announced in August 1947, the violence was unprecedented, with Sikhs being one of the most affected religious communities both in terms of deaths, as well as property loss, injury, trauma and disruption. Sikhs and Muslims were both victims and perpetrators of retaliatory violence against each other. Estimates range between 200,000 and 2 million deaths of Sikhs, Hindus and Muslims. There were numerous rapes and mass suicides by Sikh women, they being taken captive, their rescues, and above all a mass exodus of Sikhs from newly created Pakistan into newly independent India. The partition created the "largest foot convoy of refugees recorded in [human] history, stretching over 100 kilometers long", states Banga, with nearly 300,000 people consisting mostly of "distraught, suffering, injured and angry Sikhs". Sikh and Hindu refugees from Pakistan flooded into India; Muslim refugees from India flooded into Pakistan, each into their new homeland.

==== Khalistan ====
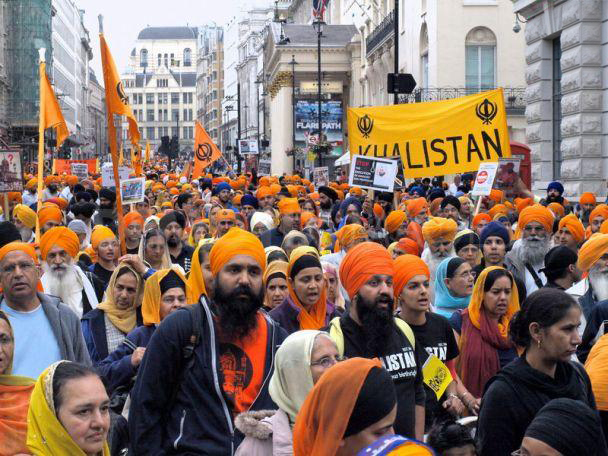
Sikhs in London protesting against the Indian government

In 1940, a few Sikhs, such as the victims of the Komagata Maru in Canada, proposed the idea of Khalistan as a buffer state between an independent India and what would become Pakistan. These leaders, however, were largely ignored. The early 1980s witnessed some Sikh groups seeking an independent state named Khalistan carved out from India and Pakistan. The Golden Temple and Akal Takht were occupied by various militant groups in 1982. These included the Dharam Yudh Morcha led by Jarnail Singh Bhindranwale, the Babbar Khalsa, the AISSF and the National Council of Khalistan. Between 1982 and 1983, there were Anandpur Resolution demand-related terrorist attacks against civilians in parts of India. By late 1983, the Bhindranwale-led group had begun to build bunkers and observation posts in and around the Golden Temple, with militants involved in weapons training. In June 1984, the then Prime Minister of India Indira Gandhi ordered Indian Army to begin Operation Blue Star against the militants. The fierce engagement took place in the precincts of Darbar Sahib and resulted in many deaths, including Bhindranwale. It also resulted in the destruction of the Sikh Reference Library, which was considered a national treasure that contained over a thousand rare manuscripts and the Akal Takht. Numerous soldiers, civilians, and militants died in the crossfire. Within days of Operation Bluestar, some 2,000 Sikh soldiers in India mutinied and attempted to reach Amritsar to liberate the Golden Temple. Within six months, on 31 October 1984, Indira Gandhi's Sikh bodyguards Satwant and Beant Singh assassinated her. The assassination triggered the 1984 anti-Sikh riots. According to Donald Horowitz, while anti-Sikh riots led to much damage and deaths, many serious provocations by militants also failed to trigger ethnic violence in many cases throughout the 1980s. The Sikhs and their neighbours, for the most part, ignored attempts to provoke riots and communal strife.

== Sikh people ==
Sikhs in India
State/Union Territory	Percentage
Punjab	57.7%
Chandigarh	13.1%
Haryana	4.9%
Delhi	3.4%
Uttarakhand	2.3%
Jammu and Kashmir	1.9%
Rajasthan	1.3%
Himachal Pradesh	1.2%

Sikhs in Canada
Province/Territory	Percentage
British Columbia	5.9%
Manitoba	2.7%
Alberta	2.5%
Ontario	2.1%
Yukon	1.0%

Sikhs in England
Region	Percentage
West Midlands	2.9%
Greater London	1.6%
East Midlands	1.1%

Sikhs in Australia
State/Territory	Percentage
Victoria	1.4%
South Australia	1.0%
Australian Capital Territory	1.0%

Sikhs in New Zealand
Region	Percentage
Bay of Plenty	1.6%
Auckland	1.5%

Estimates as of 2019 state that Sikhism has some 25–30 million followers worldwide. A 2020 estimate by Charles Preston gives a figure of 29,254,000 of Sikhs worldwide. According to Pew Research, a think tank and research group based in Washington, DC, over 9-in-10 Sikhs are in India, but there are also sizeable Sikh communities in the United States, the United Kingdom, and Canada. Within India, the Sikh population is found in every state and union territory, but it is predominantly found in the northwestern and northern states. Only in the state of Punjab do Sikhs constitute a majority (58% of the total, per 2011 census). In addition to Punjab, the states and union territories of India where Sikhs constitute more than 1.5% of their population are Chandigarh, Haryana, Delhi, Uttarakhand, and Jammu and Kashmir, all of which are in the northern half of India.

Canada is home to the largest proportion of Sikhs, as a ratio of the country's total population, in the world, at 2.1%. Within Canada, Sikhs form 5.9% of the total population in the western province of British Columbia, representing the third-largest Sikh proportion amongst all global administrative divisions, behind only Punjab and Chandigarh in India. British Columbia, Manitoba, and Yukon hold the distinction of being three of the only four administrative divisions in the world with Sikhism as the second-most followed religion among the population. (Note: Sikhism is the second-largest religion in British Columbia, Manitoba, and Yukon. Per the 2011 Indian census, Sikhism is the largest religion in Punjab and second in Chandigarh. These are the only two Indian states/UTs where Sikhism is one of the two most common religions.)

Prior to the 1947 partition of British India, millions of Sikhs lived in what later became Pakistan. Likewise, Sikhism was founded in what is now Pakistan, and some of the gurus were born near Lahore and in other parts of Pakistan. During the partition, Sikhs and Hindus left the newly created Muslim-majority Pakistan and mostly moved to Hindu-majority India—with some moving to Muslim-majority Afghanistan—while numerous Muslims in India moved to Pakistan. According to 2017 news reports, only about 20,000 Sikhs remain in Pakistan, and their population is dwindling (0.01% of the country's estimated 200 million population).

=== Sikh sects ===
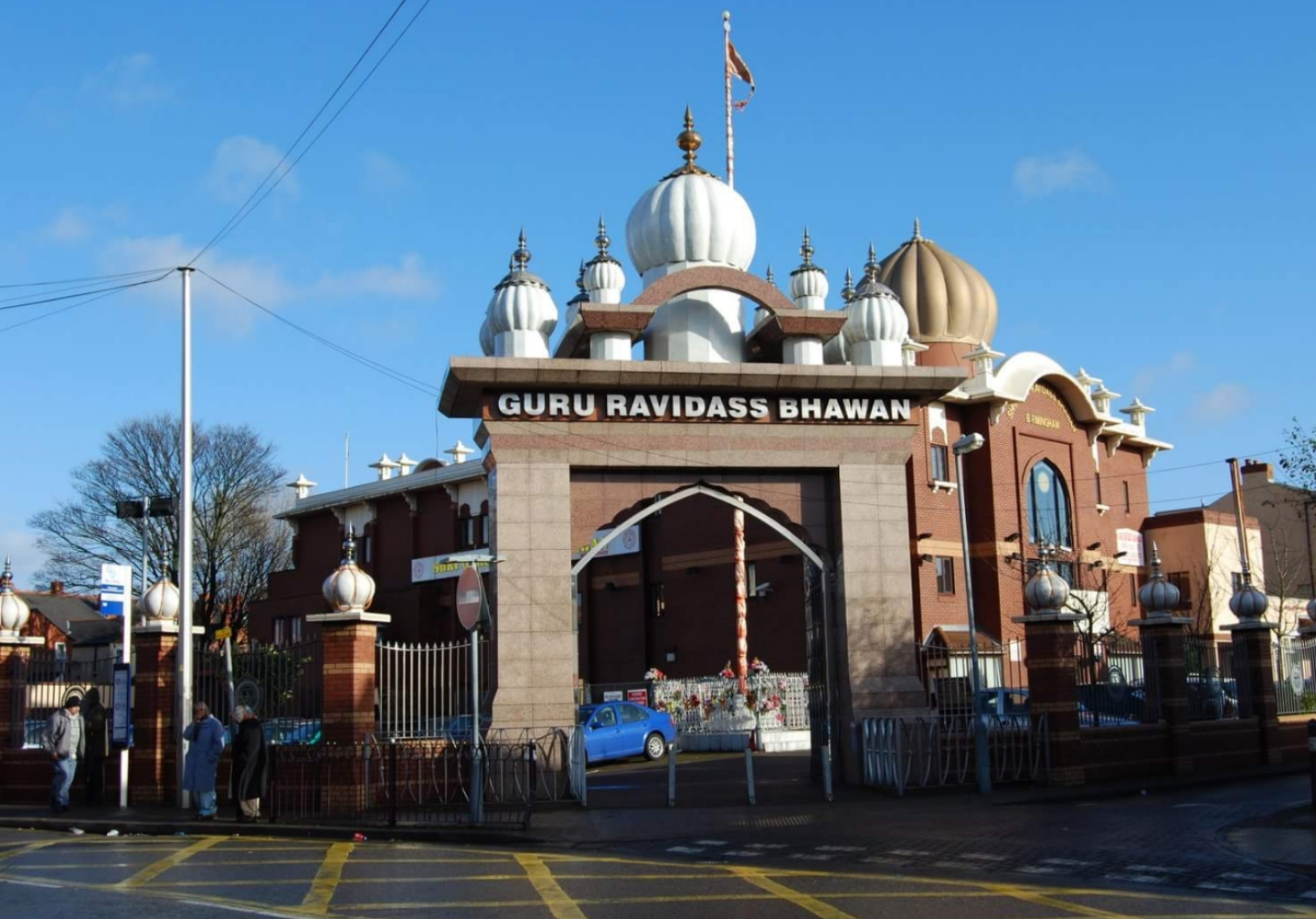
Ravidassia Sikh Gurdwara, Birmingham

Sikh sects are sub-traditions within Sikhism that believe in an alternate lineage of gurus, or have a different interpretation of the Sikh scriptures, or believe in following a living guru, or hold other concepts that differ from the orthodox Khalsa Sikhs. The major historic sects of Sikhism have included Udasi, Nirmala, Nanakpanthi, Khalsa, Sahajdhari, Namdhari Kuka, Nirankari, and Sarvaria.

Sikhs originally had only five orders, or sampradas (not to be confused with deviant sects). These include:

Nihangs – the Sikh Panth's warriors or armed troops. There are two main groups within this order: Buddha Dal, or the army of veterans, and Tarna Dal, or the army of youth. There are other smaller sub-orders connected to these two. The president of the Buddha Dal previously always served as the president of the Akaal Takht, which has jurisdiction over all things pertaining to the Akaali Nihang order.

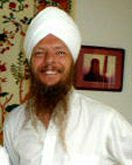
Sant Singh Khalsa, a white convert to Sikhism, authored the most widely used translation of the Guru Granth Sahib.

Nirmalas – scholars. Composed texts as well as traditionally studying a wide range of Indian and some non-Indian literature. They converse with other Dharmik pathways as well. The tenth guru also institutionalised them. Bhai Daya Singh Ji Samparda and Bhai Dharam Singh Ji Samparda, two of the Panj Pyare or cherished ones of the tenth guru, founded two Nirmala orders.

Udasis – an ascetic group that historically looked after Gurdwaras and carried out missionary activity. Although not promoting it to others, certain of their practices depart from the majority of Sikh beliefs. Baba Sri Chand, the eldest Sahibzada (son) of the first guru, Guru Nanak Dev, founded the order. Their Gurdev is Baba Sri Chand.

Sevapanthis – philanthropists who engage in charitable work/seva, or selfless service, without expecting payment. They also work on academic projects. Bhai Kanhaiya, a Sikh of the ninth and tenth gurus, served as the first head of the order and is renowned for his wartime medical assistance to wounded enemy soldiers. Very few of them exist today. The environment in which they lived and with which they interacted was a predominantly Muslim one.

Gyaaniyan Samparda – the university of Sikhi, whilst technically not an order, it essentially serves as one. Made up from individuals belonging to all of the above sects. Many branches within this order.

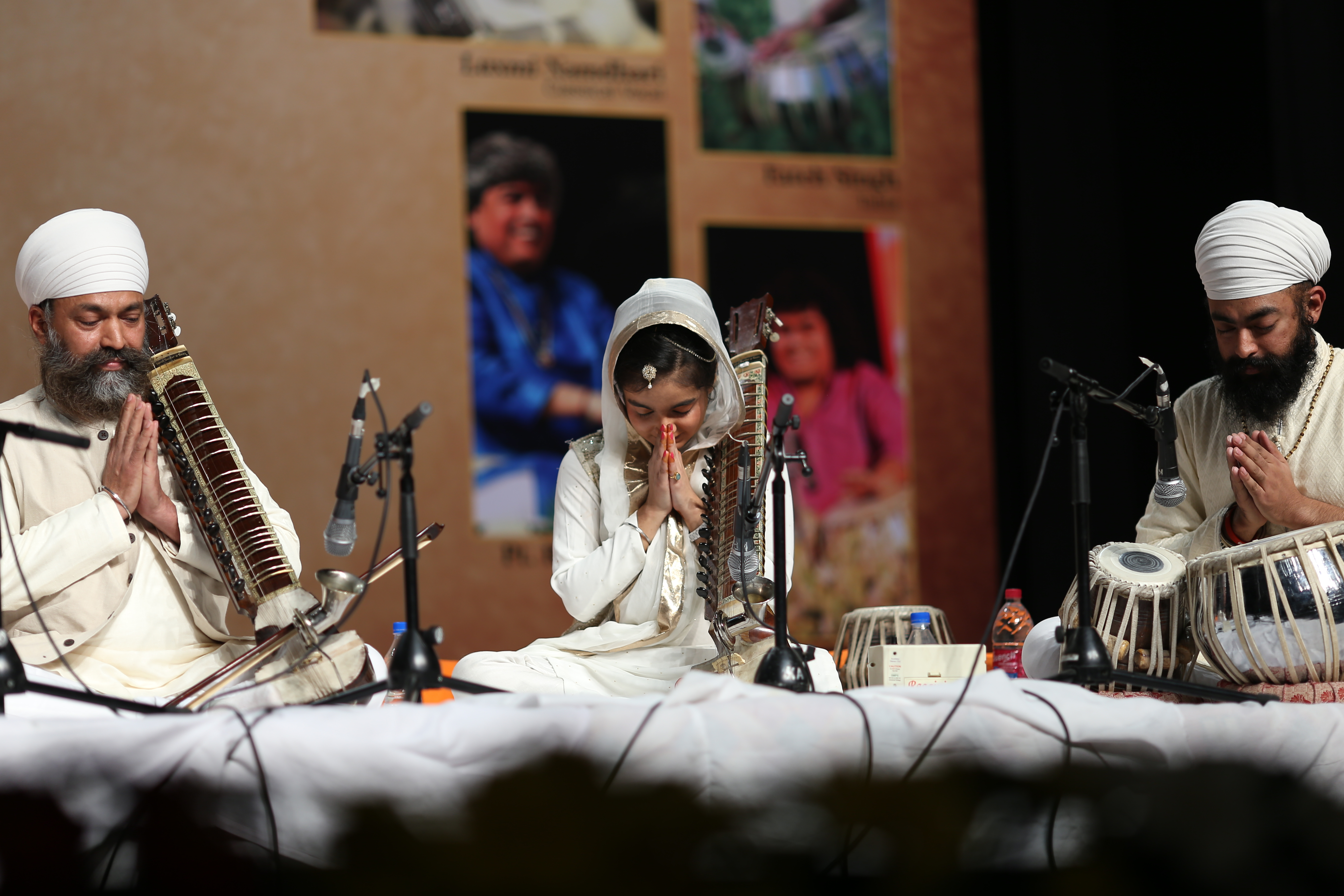
Namdhari Sikhs, also called the Kuka Sikhs, are a sect of Sikhism known for their crisp white dress and horizontal pagari (turban). Above: Namdhari singer and musicians.

The early Sikh sects were Udasis and Minas founded by Baba Sri Chand – the elder son of Guru Nanak, and Prithi Chand – the elder son of Guru Ram Das, respectively, in parallel to the official succession of the Sikh gurus. Later on, the Ramraiya sect, founded by Ram Rai, grew in Dehradun with the patronage of Aurangzeb. Many splintered Sikh communities formed during the Mughal Empire era. Some of these sects were financially and administratively supported by the Mughal rulers in the hopes of gaining a more favourable and compliant citizenry.

After the collapse of the Mughal Empire, and particularly during the rule of Ranjit Singh, Udasi Sikhs protected Sikh shrines, preserved the Sikh scripture, and rebuilt those that were desecrated or destroyed during the Muslim–Sikh wars. However, Udasi Sikhs kept idols and images inside these Sikh temples. In the 19th century, Namdharis and Nirankaris sects were formed in Sikhism, seeking to reform and return to what each believed was the pure form of Sikhism.

All these sects differ from Khalsa orthodox Sikhs in their beliefs and practices, such as continuing to solemnise their weddings around fire and being strictly vegetarian. Many accept the concept of living gurus such as Guru Baba Dyal Singh. The Nirankari sect, though unorthodox, was influential in shaping the views of Tat Khalsa and the contemporary-era Sikh beliefs and practices. Another significant Sikh sect of the 19th century was the Radhasoami movement in Punjab led by Baba Shiv Dyal. Other contemporary era Sikhs sects include the 3HO, formed in 1971, which exists outside India, particularly in North America and Europe.

=== Sikh castes ===
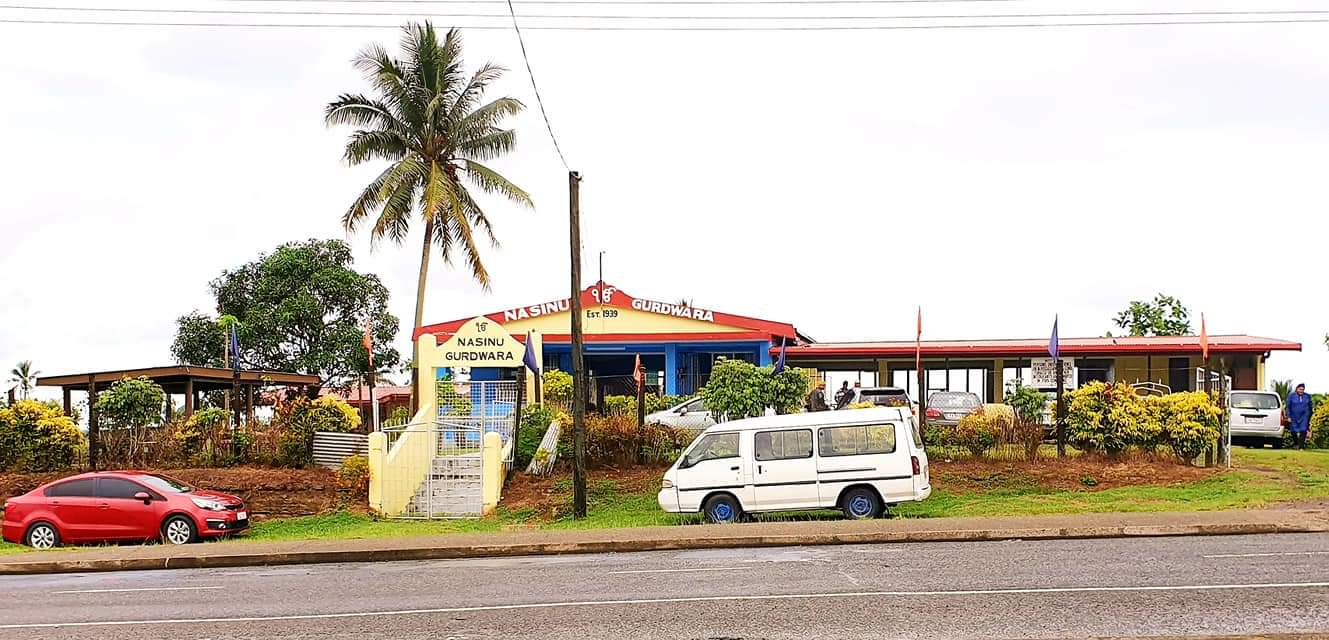
Ravidassia Sikh Gurdwara, Nasinu, Fiji Established in 1939

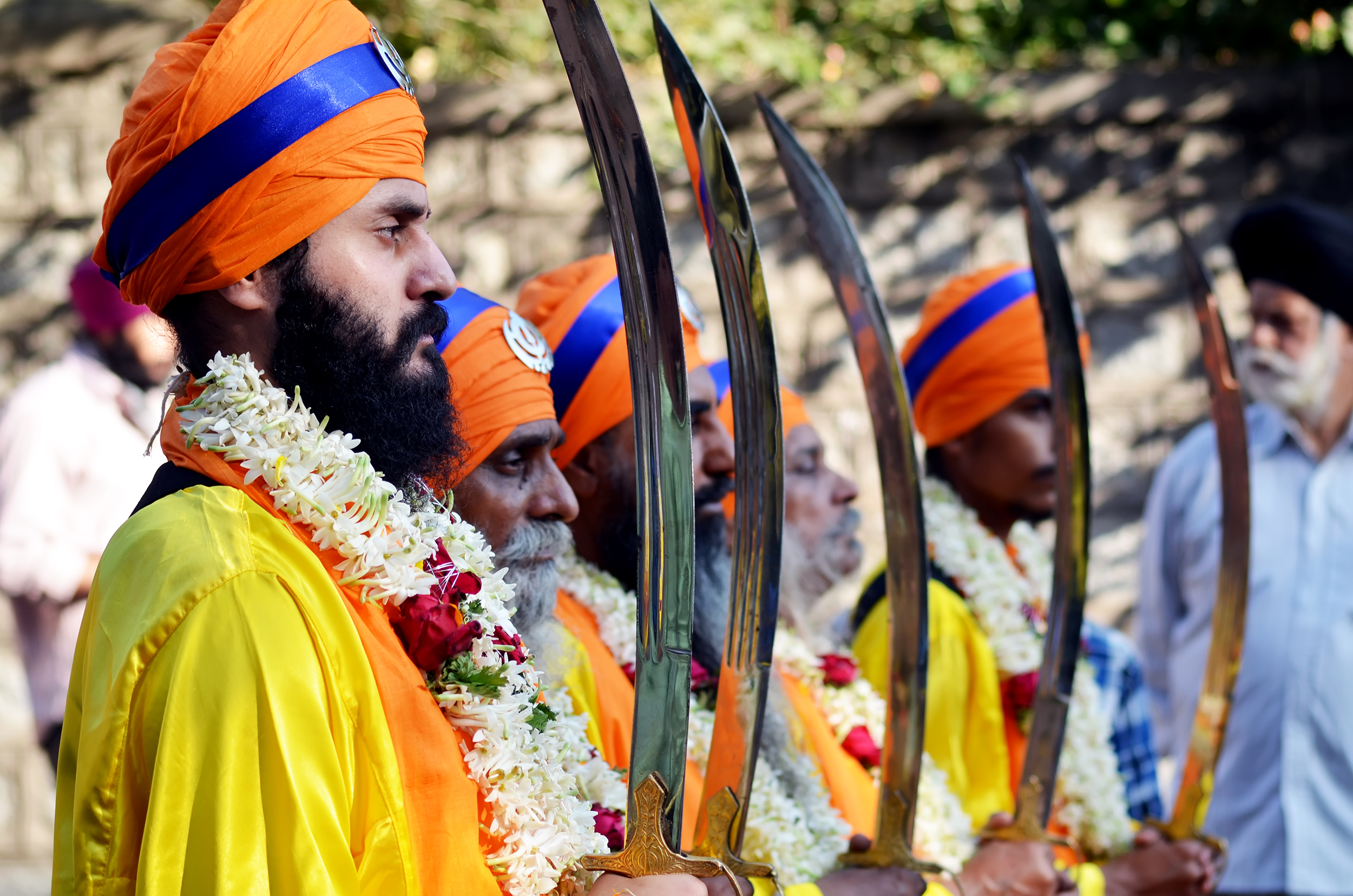
Nagar Kirtan in Bangalore

According to Surinder Jodhka, the state of Punjab with a Sikh majority has the "largest proportion of scheduled caste population in India". Although decried by Sikhism, Sikhs have practiced a caste system. The system, along with untouchability, has been more common in rural parts of Punjab. The landowning dominant Sikh castes, states Jodhka, "have not shed all their prejudices against the lower castes or dalits; while dalits would be allowed entry into the village gurdwaras they would not be permitted to cook or serve langar." The Sikh dalits of Punjab have tried to build their own gurdwara, other local-level institutions and sought better material circumstances and dignity. According to Jodhka, due to economic mobility in contemporary Punjab, castes no longer mean an inherited occupation, nor are work relations tied to a single location. In 1953, the government of India acceded to the demands of the Sikh leader, Master Tara Singh, to include Sikh Dalit castes in the list of scheduled castes. In the Shiromani Gurdwara Prabandhak Committee, 20 of the 140 seats are reserved for low-caste Sikhs.

The 2011 Indian Census recorded 5,390,484 Scheduled Caste individuals identifying as Sikhs in Punjab, out of the state's total Scheduled Caste population of 8,860,179, representing 33.68% of Punjab's total Sikh population (16,004,754). Over 60% of Sikhs belong to the Jat caste, which is an agrarian caste. Despite being very small in numbers, the mercantile Khatri and Arora castes wield considerable influence within the Sikh community. Other common Sikh castes include Sainis, Ramgarhias (artisans), Brahmins, Ahluwalias (formerly brewers), Rajputs, Rai Sikh (Rai), Kambojs (rural caste), Labanas, Kumhars and the two Dalit castes, known in Sikh terminology as the Mazhabis (the Chuhras) and the Ravidasias (the Chamars).

=== Sikh diaspora ===
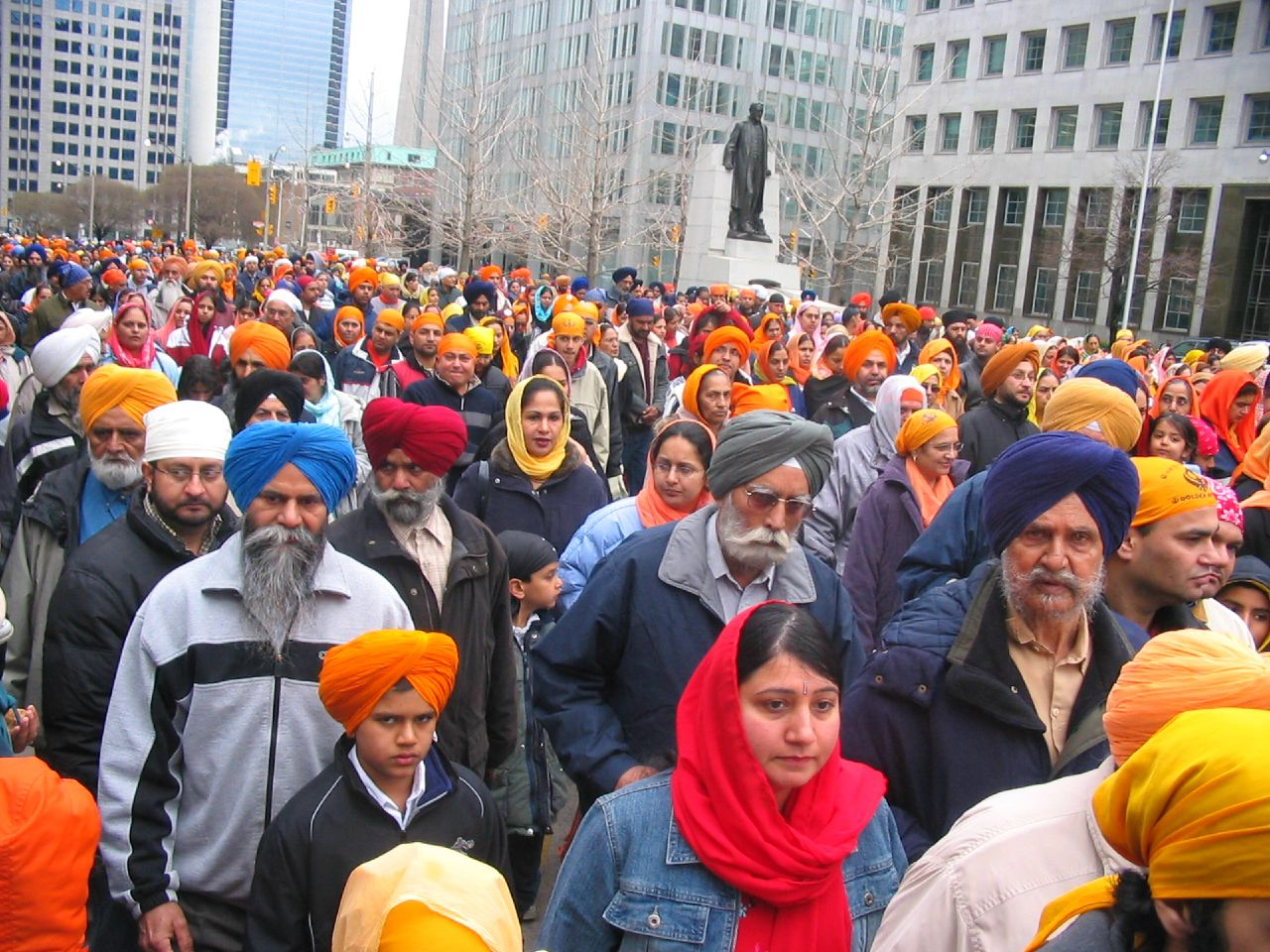
Sikhs celebrating Vaisakhi in Toronto, Canada

Worldwide, there are 30 million Sikhs, which makes up 0.4% of the world's population. Approximately 75% of Sikhs live in Punjab, where they constitute 57.7% of the state's population. Large communities of Sikhs migrate to neighbouring states such as the Indian State of Haryana, which is home to the second-largest Sikh population in India, with 1.1 million Sikhs as per the 2001 census, and large immigrant communities of Sikhs can be found across India. However, Sikhs only comprise about 1.7% of the Indian population.

Most Sikhs outside India live in the core Anglosphere, with 771,790 in Canada (2.1% Sikh), 524,140 in the United Kingdom (0.9% Sikh), 280,000 in the United States (0.1% Sikh), (Note: While the U.S. Census does not ask about religion, 70,697 Americans (or 0.02% of the total population) declared Sikh as their ethnicity in the 2020 census. In the 2021 Canadian census, 194,640 Canadians declared Sikh as their ethnicity while 771,790 Canadians declared Sikh as their religion, indicating that the Sikh American population may be around 280,329, or 0.08% of the total population. The U.S. Census Bureau estimated the adult Sikh American population at 78,000 in 2008. The Pew Research Center estimated the Sikh American adult population to be 140,000 and the total population at 200,000 in 2012 while the World Religion Database at Boston University estimated the American Sikh population to be at 280,000 in 2012. Sikh organisations like the Sikh Coalition and American Sikh Congressional Caucus estimate the Sikh American population to be as high as 1,000,000, but do not provide any sources for these figures; 500,000 nevertheless remains the most cited Sikh American population size in news media. With 1% of Asian Americans being Sikh, and 90.7% of Sikh Americans being Asian American, the American Sikh population can be estimated at around 280,000 in 2021.) 210,400 in Australia (0.8% Sikh), and 40,908 in New Zealand (0.9% Sikh). While these communities are over 125 years old, most Sikhs in the West are first-, second-, or third-generation immigrants. As of the 2021 Canadian Census, more than half of Canada's Sikhs can be found in one of four cities: Brampton (163,260), Surrey (154,415), Calgary (49,465), and Abbotsford (38,395).

Sikhs also migrated to East Africa, the Middle East, and Southeast Asia. These communities developed as Sikhs migrated out of Punjab to fill in gaps in imperial labour markets.

== Prohibitions in Sikhism ==
Four major transgressions:

- Hair removal – Hair cutting, trimming, removing, shaving, plucking, threading, dyeing, or any other alteration to any body part is strictly forbidden.
- Eating Kutha meat. This is the absolute minimum required by all initiated Sikhs. Many Sikhs refrain from eating non-vegetarian food and believe all should follow this diet. This is due to various social, cultural, political, and familial aspects. As such, there has always been major disagreement among Sikhs over the issue of eating non-vegetarian food. Sikhs following the rahit (code of conduct) of the Damdami Taksal and AKJ also subscribe to this view. The Akali Nihangs have traditionally eaten meat and are famous for performing Jhatka. Thus, there is a wide range of views that exist on the issue of a proper "Sikh diet" in the Panth. It has been stipulated that meat slaughtered via the Muslim (Halal) or Jewish (Shechita) methods is against Sikh dogma and principles. The Akal Takht represents the final authority on controversial issues concerning the Sikh Panth (community or collective). The Hukamnama (edict or clarification), issued by Akal Takht Jathedar Sadhu Singh Bhaura dated 15 February 1980, states that eating meat does not go against the code of conduct of the Sikhs. Amritdhari Sikhs can eat meat as long as it is Jhatka meat.
- Adultery: Cohabiting with a person other than one's spouse (sexual relations with anyone you are not married to).
- Intoxication – Consumption of tobacco and intoxicants (hemp, opium, liquor, narcotics, cocaine, etc.) is not allowed. Cannabis is generally prohibited, but ritually consumed in edible form by some Sikhs. Some Sikh groups, like the Damdami Taksal, are even opposed to drinking caffeine in Indian tea. Indian tea is almost always served in Sikh Gurudwaras around the world. Some Akali Nihang groups consume cannabis-containing shaheedi degh (ਭੰਗ), purportedly to help in meditation. Sūkha parshaad (ਸੁੱਖਾ ਪ੍ਰਰਸਾਦ), "Dry-sweet", is the term Akali Nihangs use to refer to it. It was traditionally crushed and consumed as a liquid, especially during festivals like Hola Mohalla. It is never smoked, as this practice is forbidden in Sikhism. In 2001, Jathedar Santa Singh, the leader of Budha Dal, along with 20 chiefs of Nihang sects, refused to accept the ban on consumption of shaheedi degh by the apex Sikh clergy of Akal Takht – in order to preserve their traditional practices. According to a 2011 BBC article, "Traditionally they also drank shaheedi degh, an infusion of cannabis, to become closer with God". Baba Santa Singh was excommunicated and replaced with Baba Balbir Singh, who agreed to shun the consumption of bhang.

Other mentioned practices to be avoided, as per the Sikh Rehat Maryada:

- Piercing of the nose or ears for wearing ornaments is forbidden for Sikh men and women. However, this is a point of contention as it was common for Sikh men and women to wear during the Sikh Misl period.
- Female infanticide: A Sikh should not kill their daughter; nor should they maintain any relationship with a killer of a daughter.
- A Sikh shall not steal, form dubious associations or engage in gambling.
- It is not proper for a Sikh woman to wear a veil or keep her face hidden.
- Sikhs cannot wear any token of any other faith, nor participate in idol worship (idolatry) according to the Guru Granth Sahib. Sikhs must not have their head bare or wear caps. They also cannot wear any ornaments piercing through any part of the body.
- Hereditary priest – Sikhism does not have priests, as they were abolished by Guru Gobind Singh. The only position he left was a Granthi to look after the Guru Granth Sahib; any Sikh is free to become a Granthi or read from the Guru Granth Sahib.

== See also ==
- Indian religions
- Five Virtues
- Panjab Digital Library
- Turban training centre
- Women in the Guru Granth Sahib
- Idolatry in Sikhism
- Khalsa
- History of Sikhism
