= Sikh scriptures =

Holy books of the Sikh religion

The principal Sikh scripture is the Adi Granth (First Scripture), more commonly called the Guru Granth Sahib. The second most important scripture of the Sikhs is the Dasam Granth. Both of these consist of text which was written or authorised by the Sikh Gurus.

Within Sikhism the Sri Guru Granth Sahib or Adi Granth is more than just a scripture. Sikhs consider this Granth (holy book) to be a living Guru. The holy text spans 1430 pages and contains the actual words spoken by the Gurus of the Sikh religion and the words of various other Saints from other religions including Hinduism and Islam.

== Terminology ==
=== Bir ===
The word 'bir' (Gurmukhi: ਬੀੜ, romanized: Bīṛa; alternatively spelt as 'birh') in Sikhism refers to a complete volume of a Sikh scripture as an individual corpus. The term "Bir" is derived from the Sanskrit verb vīḍ which means "to make strong or firm, strengthen, fasten, or to be strong, firm or hard." The word puratan biran refers to an ancient manuscript of a Sikh scripture. The first birs in Sikh history were the Kartarpuri Bir (also known as the Adi Bir, meaning "first corpus") and the Bhai Bhanno Bir. Copies of these corpuses are also referred to as "Birs". Hath-likhat biran refers to a hand-written manuscript whilst patthar shappa refers to volumes of Sikh scriptures published through stone lithography, prior to the introduction of the modern printing press.

=== Pothi ===
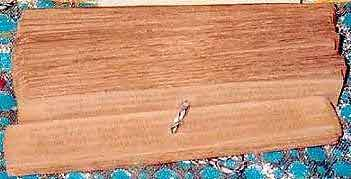
Palm-leaf manuscript (pothi) attributed to Guru Nanak and claimed to have been compiled and authored by him

The word 'pothi' (Gurmukhi: ਪੋਥੀ, romanized: Pōthī) originally meant 'book' in Old Punjabi (cognate to 'pustak' in Hindi, with both deriving from the Sanskrit word pustaka). However, amongst Sikhs the term evolved to refer to a sacred book, especially one containing Gurbani or scriptural texts and of a moderate size. Initially, the corpurses of the earlier Sikh gurus were termed as pothis rather than as birs. The literary corpus that Guru Nanak passed down to his successor, Guru Angad, is referred to as a pothi.

=== Gutka ===
A gutka (Gurmukhi: ਗੁਟਕਾ, romanized: Guṭakā) is an extract of Gurbani, which is smaller in size in-comparison to a Pothi and contains lesser amounts of hymns or specific selections. They became popularized in the 18th century, when state-enacted oppression of Sikhs forced them to be ever on the move and the portable nature of gutkas served well in this time. They became further hyped with the introduction of the printing press in the Punjab in the 19th century.

=== Lakhri ===
The term 'Lakhri' referred to the scribe of manuscripts.

== Language and script ==
The term used to label the language employed by the Sikh gurus in their compositions is Sant Bhasha, a composite literary language of North India that borrows vocabulary from a variety of regional and historical lects.

Guru Arjan decided to employ the Gurmukhi script of his predecessors when he compiled the Adi Granth. Kavi Santokh Singh, in his Suraj Prakash, explains the reasonings for why he did so as follows:

In a perfect state of oneness, the Guru called Gurdas in his presence.

Seating him close by, [the Guru] voiced the purpose: “Bhai, listen to our hope.3

Create cohesive benevolent Grinth [Braj form of 'Granth']-Anthology in the Gurmukhi [alphabets].

In Patti composed by revered Nanak, beautiful are the thirty-five [alphabets].4

Scribe the entire Gurbani in them; it is very easy to study them. Those graced with great intellect shall practice it to learn.5

They will study and reflect for many years, then they may realize the essence. With heart filled with devotion, scribe that essence in Gurmukhi with ease.6

Intellectuals can scribe it in Sanskrit and [Perso-Arabic] language of the Turks. It will spread all over quickly as the oil over water.7

Householders [busy] earning have less wisdom; those seeking education can study it with ease. The great pathway will be revealed, and those treading it will never go astray any time.8

Therefore, scribe them in Gurmukhi alphabets; it will be availed in the whole world. Devoted ones will study with ease; they will realize freedom is in Hari-1’s [Guru Nanak] remembrance.9

Their greatness is very beautiful; Gurmukhi’s identity will be known in the world. Ones who will witness, study, and scribe will respect it,

ones who acknowledge it as the eliminator of sins-transgressions will love it.”10

— Kavi Santokh Singh, Sri Gur Pratap Suraj Granth (Ras 3, Adhiai 41)

== History ==
Starting with the founder of the faith, Guru Nanak, sacred compositions recorded and devised by Sikhs were kept in a pothi. Guru Nanak would pass his personal pothi down to his successor, Guru Angad, who would himself pass it down to his successor and so-on and so-forth. Eventually, Guru Arjan collected the scattered pothis linked to his predecessors and published the Adi Granth in 1604, assisted in his endeavor by Bhai Gurdas acting as the scribe. The reason for him doing so has been said to have been that heretical sects, such as Minas, were using the pen-names of earlier Gurus and attempting to circulate their compositions as sanctified Sikh writings. Scholars Mandanjit Kaur and Piar Singh state the following regarding the motivations of the Guru for assembling an authoritative canonical text:

Stray compilations of them [sabads] were in circulation. Conscious or unconscious interference in their text, often prompted by a desire to round off a word or a phrase or to regulate its metrical flow in accordance with the whim of the singer, was not an uncommon phenomenon. To check this, the need to place an authentic version of the bānī in the hands of the readers seemed paramount. The corpus of the bānī left by the third and the fourth Gurus, as also composed by Guru Arjun himself, had grown enormously. There was a need to regulate it, lest it should be lost. There was a danger of its being interpolated by imitators too. Guru Arjun, therefore, thought it fit to compile the whole corpus of gurubānī in a befitting way and, thus, leave behind himself an authorized version of the Sikh Scripture.

— Mandanjit Kaur and Piar Singh, Guru Arjan and His Sukhmani by Kapur Singh, introductory section

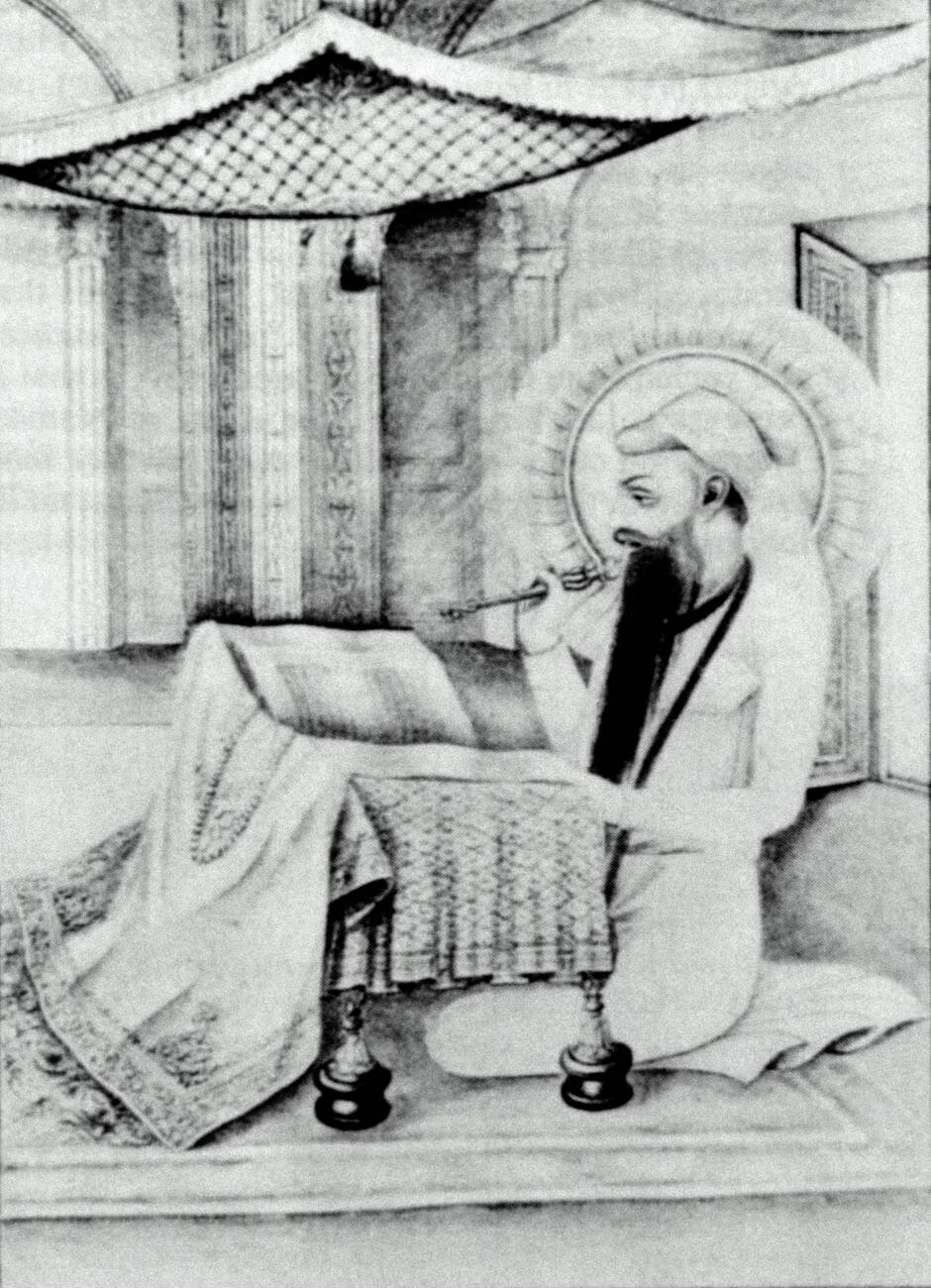
Illustration of Guru Arjan with the Adi Granth before him from 'The Sikh Religion' (1909)

Various recensions of the primary Sikh canon, the Guru Granth Sahib, are known aside from the two primary ones most recognized by Sikhs today (Kartarpuri and Damdami). The recension published by Guru Arjan in 1604 would come to be known as the Kartarpuri Bir (also known as the Adi Bir). The original manuscript of the Kartarpuri Bir is preserved by the Sodhi family inhabiting Kartarpur, Jalandhar district.

Another recension, known as the Bhai Banno Bir (also known as the Bhai Bhannowali Bir), was also in circulation. The composition of this recension is traced back to 1604 by Bhai Banno, a prominent follower of the Guru, who prepared an unauthorized copy of the composition of Guru Arjan when the Guru asked him to get the leafs bound together into a manuscript at Lahore. Another view is that it was prepared in 1642 by a certain Banno of Khara Mangat (located in modern-day Gujrat district). This composition contains many extraneous, superfluous, and apocryphal writings, including sectoral Mina compositions and compositions of the female Bhakti saint, Mirabai.

There further existed a third recension, known as the Lahori Bir. The Lahori Bir was composed in around 1610 and was found in a shrine in Pakistan. The Lahori Bir is mostly similar to the sanctified Kartarpuri Bir, however differences lay in the ordering of Bhagat (devotional poets) and Bhatt (bardic poets) compositions found at the end of the scripture.

Guru Gobind Singh would later publish the Damdami recension (also spelt as 'Damdama') of the Adi Granth with Bhai Mani Singh acting as the scribe. The reason for him doing so has been said to be the unauthorized recensions of the Adi Granth scattered around, especially the Banno recension which contained unauthorized additions. This is the recension in-which the guruship was given to in 1708 and rechristened as the Guru Granth Sahib, however the original Damdami manuscript was lost during the Vadda Ghalughara in 1762. Two exact copies of the Damdami recension, one manuscript dating to 1682 and the other dated to 1691, were kept at the Sikh Reference Library and are presumed to be lost forever after the library was burnt down by Indian forces during Operation Blue Star in 1984.

== Shaant Ras (Essence of Peace) ==
=== Guru Granth Sahib ===
The principal Sikh scripture is the Adi Granth (First Scripture), more commonly called the Guru Granth Sahib. The Sikhs do not regard this as their "holy book" but as their perpetual and current "guru", guide or master. It was called Adi Granth until Guru Gobind Singh, the tenth and final guru in human form, conferred on it the title of the guru in 1708, after which it was called Sri Guru Granth Sahib, or Guru Granth Sahib for short. The Granth has 1430 Ang Sahib (ang meaning limb since the Guru Granth Sahib is not a book but it is the eternal Guru for Sikhs) divided into 39 chapters. All copies are exactly alike. The Sikhs are forbidden from making any changes to the text within this scripture.

The Guru Granth Sahib was compiled by Guru Arjan Dev, the fifth guru of the Sikhs. The work of compilation was started in 1601 and finished in 1604. The Granth, called "Pothi Sahib" by Guru Arjan, was installed at Harmandir Sahib (House of God) with much celebration.

==== Authorship ====
The Guru Granth Sahib is widely accepted as containing the works of six Gurus, fifteen Bhagats (devotional poets), elevent Bhatts (bardic poets), and four Gursikhs (devoted Sikhs). The SGPC version of the Guru Granth Sahib has the works of 6 Gurus while the Nihang version has the works of 7 gurus including one couplet by Guru Har Rai.

==== Sections ====
The Guru Granth Sahib can be divided into three main sections:

1. Introduction (pages 1–13): Containing in-sequence of appearance the Mul Mantar, Japji (meaning "to meditate"), five hymns of So Dar (meaning "that gate") four hymns of So Purakh (meaning "that Being"), and five verses of the Sohila.
2. Raga (pages 14–1353): This is the by-far the largest section, where compositions of the authors are ordered by traditional Indic musical modes, metres, or measures, known as ragas. The chapters in this section begin with a verse by a Sikh guru and end with a verse of a Bhagat. Each raga chapter begins with shorter compositions and end with longer ones. The compositions of the Gurus are arranged by chronological order, with Guru Nanak's verses coming first, Guru Angad's second, and so forth. The Gurus are referred to as Mahala (house, palace, or vessel) in the headings, with Guru Nanak being referred to as the First Mahala (M.1) and so-on by order of guruship succession (Angad – M.2, Amar Das – M.3, Ram Das – M.4, Arjan Dev – M.5, Tegh Bahadur – M.9).
3. Conclusion (pages 1354–1430): Contains miscellaneous compositions and works that were left out of the earlier raga section, including individual works of Nanak, Amar Das, Arjan, Tegh Bahadur, Kabir, Farid, Kalh, Harbans, and Mathura. Contains the Mundavani (closing seal) and gratification couplet of Guru Arjan and after that is the controversial and much-debated Ragamala.

==== Japji Sahib ====
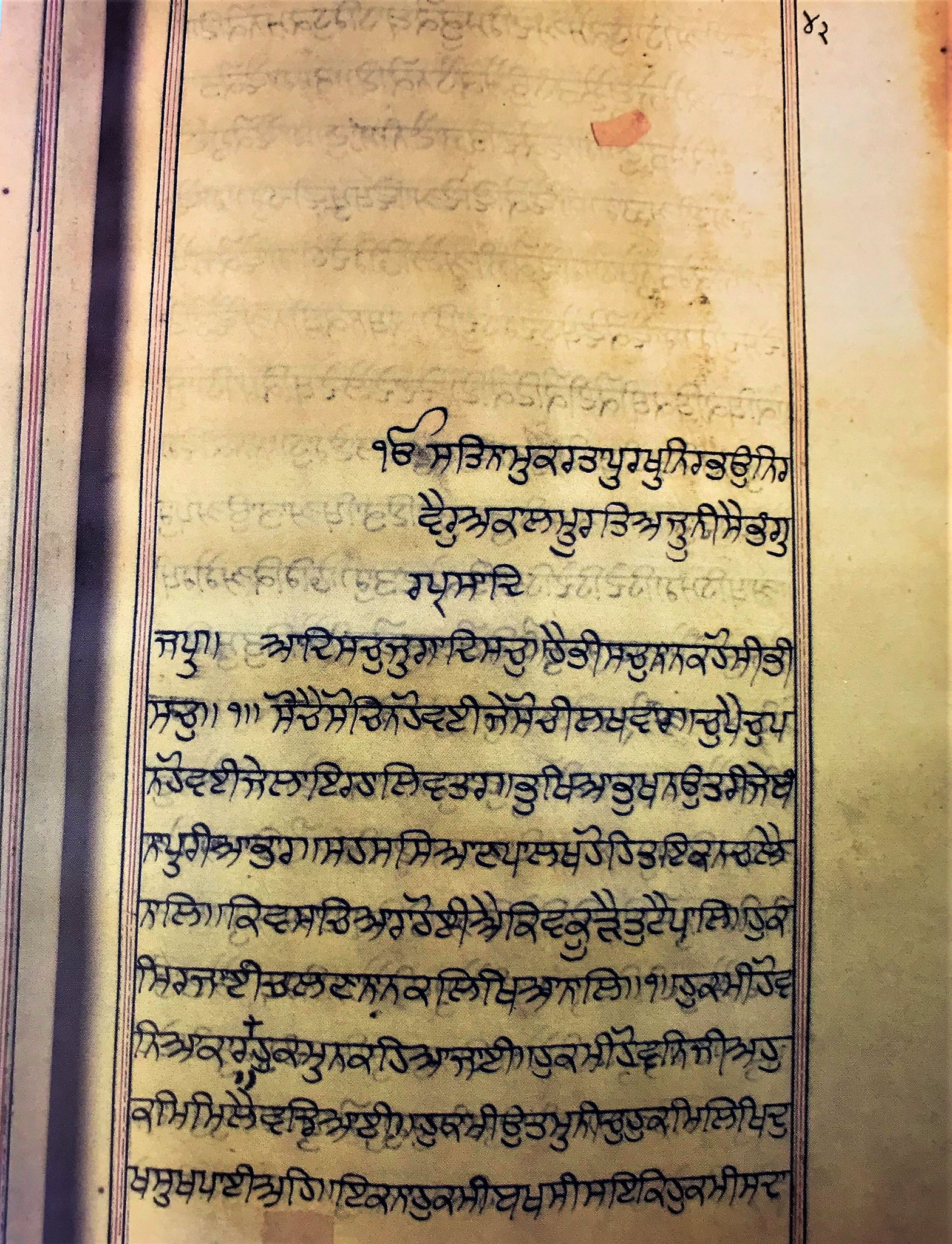
Part of Japji Sahib, a section of a Guru Granth Sahib manuscript from Guru Ka Bagh, Banaras, now housed at Bhai Gurdas Library G.N.D.U.

Japji Sahib is a Sikh prayer, that appears at the beginning of the Guru Granth Sahib – the scripture and the eternal guru of the Sikhs. It was composed by Guru Nanak, the founder of Sikhism. It begins with Mool Mantra and then follow 38 paudis (stanzas) and completed with a final Salok by Guru Angad at the end of this composition. The 38 stanzas are in different poetic meters.

Japji Sahib is the first composition of Guru Nanak, and is considered the comprehensive essence of Sikhism. Expansion and elaboration of Japji Sahib is the entire Guru Granth Sahib. It is the first Bani in Nitnem. Notable is Guru Nanak's discourse on 'what is true worship' and what is the nature of God'. According to Christopher Shackle, it is designed for "individual meditative recitation" and as the first item of daily devotional prayer for the devout. It is a chant found in the morning and evening prayers in Sikh gurdwaras. It is also chanted in the Sikh tradition at the Khalsa initiation ceremony and during the cremation ceremony.

=== Bhai Gurdas Varan ===
Varan Bhai Gurdas is the name given to the 40 varan (chapters) of writing by Bhai Gurdas. They have been referred to as the "Key to the Guru Granth Sahib" by Guru Arjan Dev, the fifth Sikh guru. He was the first scribe of Guru Granth Sahib and a scholar of great repute. From his work, it is clear that he had mastery of various Indian languages and had studied many ancient Indian religious scriptures.

==== Languages ====
The following languages are found in this Granth:

- Punjabi – many Sikh Gurus, Bhagat (saint) Sheikh Farid and others
- Sindhi – Guru Arjan
- Sanskrit – Guru Nanak, Guru Arjan and others
- Gujarati and Marathi – Bhagat Namdev and Trilochan
- Western Hindi – Bhagat Kabir
- Eastern Hindi – Court poets
- Eastern Apabhramshas – Bhagat Jaidev
- Persian and Arabic – Bhagat Namdev and Guru Nanak

The first published translation of the Guru Granth Sahib into Sindhi was done in 1959 by Jethanand B. Lalwani of Bharat Jivan Publications. He used his entire personal savings and produced 500 copies. Lalwani later took out loans to make a reprint in 1963.

The knowledge that enshrines and illuminates Guru Granth Sahib does not recommend translation; instead a direct learning connection with Guru Granth Sahib is only advised. This recommendation reduces learner's bias through secondary translations and middle channels that could mislead a learners' journey.

== Bir Ras (Essence of War) ==
=== Dasam Granth ===
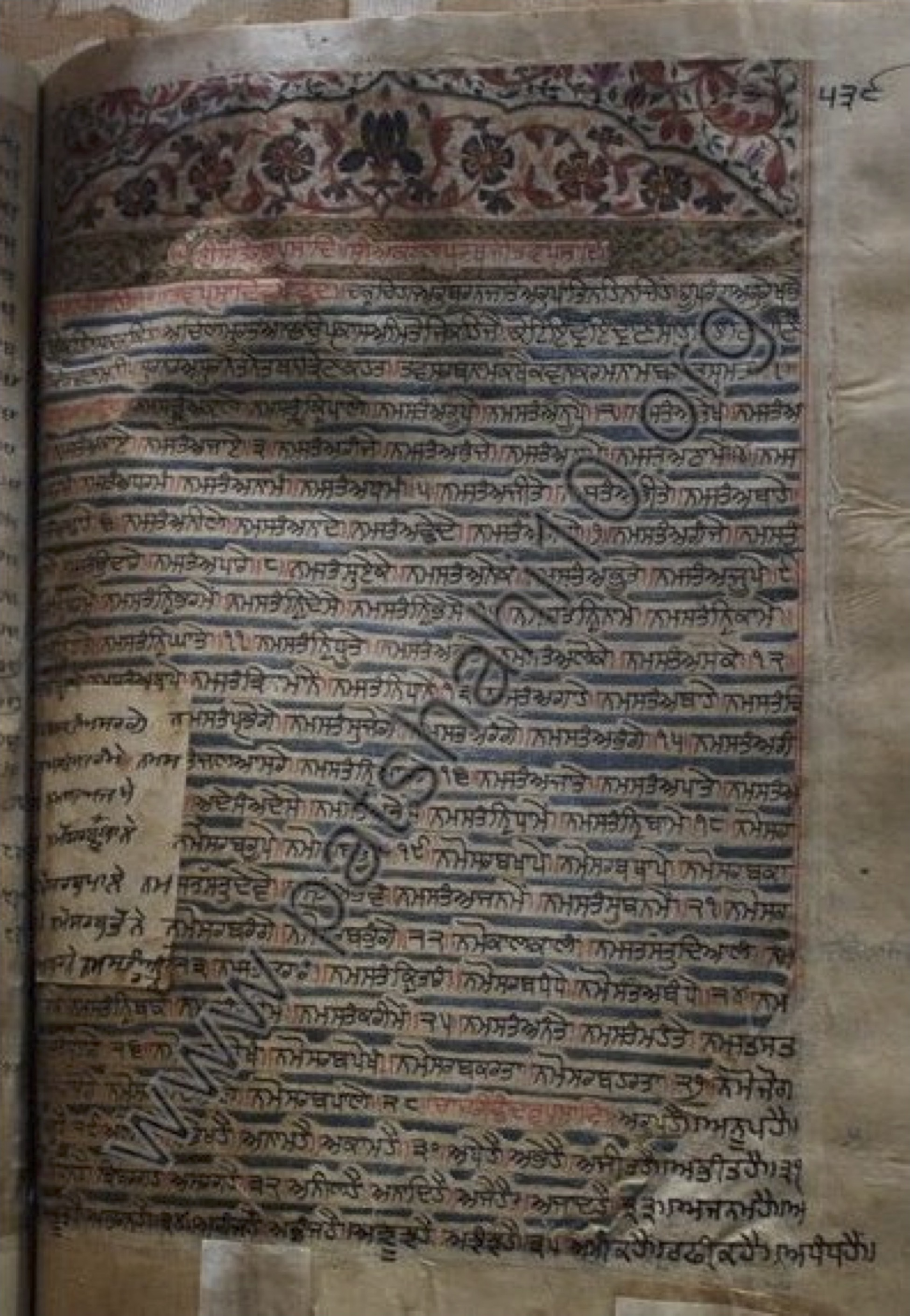
Page from the illuminated Bhai Mani Singh bir (manuscript) of the Dasam Granth dated to the early part of the 18th century

This is regarded as the second holiest book of the Sikhs and is called the Dasam Granth – the book of the tenth guru. The Granth was compiled three years after the guru's death and it was Mata Sundri, the widow of the guru, who asked Bhai Mani Singh, a contemporary of the guru, to collect all the hymns composed by the guru and prepare a Granth of the Guru. However, the narrative of Bhai Mani Singh being the collector and compiler of Guru Gobind Singh's writings is strongly based on a letter purported to be Bhai Mani Singh writing to Mata Sundari. The authenticity of this letter has been challenged by scholars like Rattan Singh Jaggi, who claim the writing style does not match Bhai Mani Singh's time period and the letter only surfaced in the 1920's. It was completed in 1711. In its present form it contains 1428 pages and 16 chapters as listed below. The Nihang Dasam Granth contains 70 chapters.

- Jaap (meditation)
- Bichitra Natak (autobiography of the Guru)
- Akal Ustat (praises of God)
- Chandi Charitar I & II (the character of goddess Chandi)
- Chandi di Var (a ballad to describe goddess Durga)
- Gian Prabodh (the awakening of knowledge)
- Chaubis Avtar (24 incarnations of Vishnu ordered by Supreme God)
- Brahm Avtar (incarnation of Brahma)
- Rudar Avtar (incarnation of Shiva)
- Shabad Hazare (ten shabads)
- Swayyae (33 stanzas)
- Khalsa Mehma (the praises of the Khalsa)
- Shaster Nam Mala (a list of weapons)
- Triya Charitar (the character of humans whose fall in deeply and mentally sexual desire )
- Zafarnamah (epistle of victory, a letter written to Emperor Aurangzeb)
- Hikayats (stories)

The following are the main banis regularly recited by devoted amritdhari Sikhs:

1. Japji Sahib
2. Jaap Sahib
3. Tav Prasad Savaiye
4. Chaupai Sahib
5. Anand Sahib
6. Rehiraas Sahib
7. Kirtan Sohila or Sohila Sahib

=== Sarbloh Granth ===
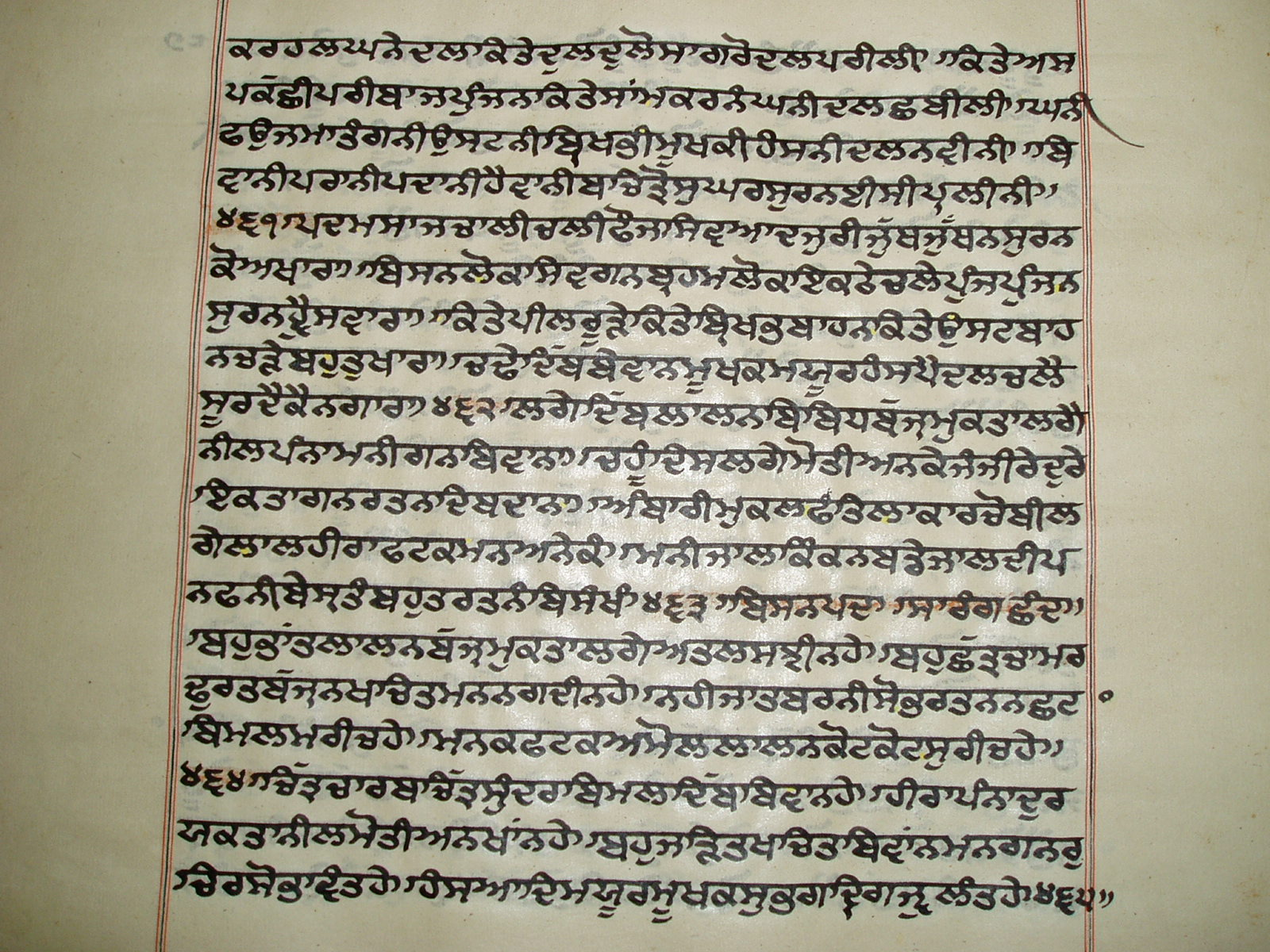
Folio of an 18th-century handwritten Sarbloh Granth manuscript

The Sarbloh Granth (Punjabi: ਸਰਬਲੋਹ ਗ੍ਰੰਥ, sarabalŝha grantha) also called Manglacharan Puran, is a voluminous book contains collections of various writings of Guru Gobind Singh, Poets and other Sikhs. Sarbloh Granth literally means "the Granth or Scripture of all-steel or iron". Khalsa Mahima is part of this Granth. This Granth contains hymns of greatness of Panth and Granth. Khalsa Mahima is authentic hymn of Guru Gobind Singh of this granth.

==== Languages ====
- Khadi boli
- Konkani and Marathi
- Punjabi
- Persian
- Hyderabadi
- Brij
- Influence of Awadhi
- Panjabi
- Influence of Urdu
- Persian
- Influence of Arabic

== Conservation ==
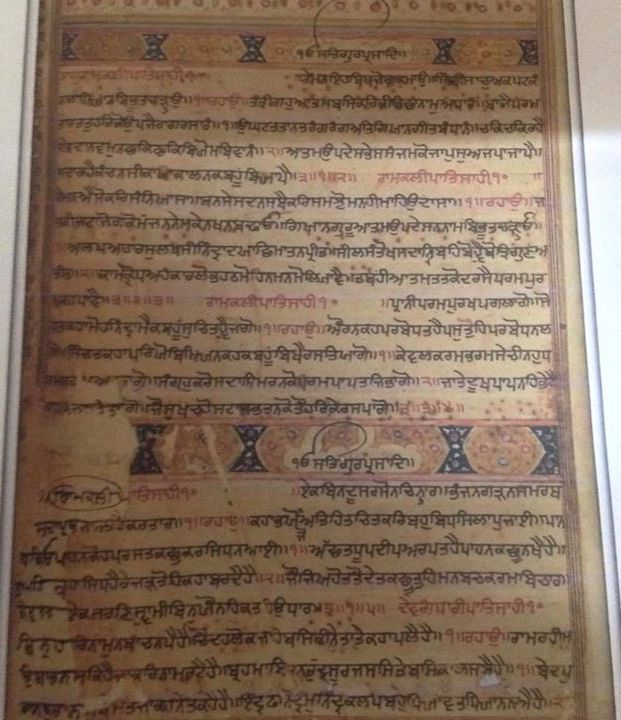
Decorated page of the Dasam Granth from the Patna Sahib bir (manuscript)

Manuscripts of the Sikh scriptures are often burnt as a form of devotion by Sikhs once they are no longer used for regular reading or worship, however there is a movement toward conserving such codices instead to preserve Sikh heritage as an alternative form of seva. Large amounts of historical Sikh scriptural manuscripts have been systematically "cremated" (burnt to destruction) over the years at secretive ‘Angitha Sahib’ gurdwaras in Punjab and around India under the guise of kar seva. This practice is criticized for systematically destroying historical manuscripts rendering them unable to be researched, archived, repaired, or conserved for future generations. There have been instances of so-called Satkar Sabhas (or Satkar Committees) stealing historical manuscripts from their traditional custodians and refusing to return them. The SGPC has been criticized for the poor "restoration" methods it has conducted on historical manuscripts of Sikh scriptures.

Pothi Seva is a Sikh organization dedicated toward the conservation and repair of historical Sikh texts, including scriptures.

=== Digitization ===
UNICEF originally microfilmed some Sikh scriptural manuscripts sometime in the 20th century.

Panjab Digital Library in collaboration with the Nanakshahi Trust took up digitization of Sikh scriptures in 2003. Thousands of manuscripts have been digitized and are available online at Panjab Digital Library.

Digitization efforts which began in 2008 are also ongoing at the Sikh Reference Library to scan the scriptural manuscripts and other literature held within its collection.

On 6 September 2023, the SGPC announced plans to digitize Sikh literature and scriptures kept in the collection of Sri Guru Ramdas Library in Amritsar. There are plans to make the digitized works available to the public on a website in the near future.

== See also ==
- Sant Bhasha
- History of Dasam Granth
- Sikh architecture
- Sikh art and culture
- History of Sikhism
- Gurbani
- Nitnem
- Bhat Vahis
- Panjab Digital Library
