= Gurbani =

Sikh hymns

Gurbani from Nitnem Pothi Sahib

Gurbani (Punjabi: ਗੁਰਬਾਣੀ, pronunciation: [ɡɝbaːɳiː], lit. the Guru's words; gurbāṇī) is a Sikh term, very commonly used by Sikhs to refer to various compositions by the Sikh Gurus and other writers of Guru Granth Sahib. In general, hymns in the central text of the Sikhs, the Guru Granth Sahib, are called Gurbani. Among Amritdhari Sikhs, a few texts from Dasam Granth which are read as Nitnem, like Tav-Prasad Savaiye and Chaupai, are also considered Gurbani. In Adi Granth, Gurbani is a sound which comes directly from the Supreme and the text is a written form of the same in worldly language and scripts. It is also called Guru’s Bani.

Prior to reading Gurbani or meditating, it is compulsory to cover the head with a turban, dupatta or other cloth, as well as removing shoes, performing at least the Panj Ishnan (washing of the 5 main parts of the body), and if possible using a teeth-cleaning twig. Gurbani are explanations of qualities of the Primal Lord and Soul which a Sikh should comprehend and with which they can attain the supreme state. Sikh historical writings, unauthentic writings or apocryphal compositions written under the names of Sikh Gurus and other writings by Sikhs are not considered Gurbani and are referred to as Kachi Bani (ਕੱਚੀ ਬਾਣੀ; meaning adulterated verses).

== Etymology ==
Gurbani is composed of two words: 'Gur' and 'Bani'. Gur has multiple meanings depending on context. In Guru Granth Sahib, Gur is used for multiple meanings, as per context of hymn. The common use of Gur is either for wisdom and internal conscious mind (referred to as Chitta or Antar Atma).

According to Pashaura Singh, compositions found in the Guru Granth Sahib are referred to either as bani ("utterances") or gurbani ("utterance of the guru").

Thereby Gurbani either means the speech of wisdom or the speech of conscious mind.

== Significance ==
Gurbani is directly received from inside after attaining a Supreme state, whereas the Granth or textual form is worldly language of the same. Gurbani is also referred to as Dhur Ki Bani (ਧੁਰ ਕੀ ਬਾਣੀ; meaning the speech from the Supreme house). In the Adi Granth, it is considered a source of spiritual knowledge which illuminates the mind and gives internal bliss. The one who comprehends Gurbani is also described as an Amritdhari. Gurbani is a source of truth with which the internal filth and sins get eradicated and one who find Gurbani sweet is in supreme state.

Extracts from Guru Granth Sahib are called Gutkas (ਗੁਟਕਾ; meaning small books) containing sections of Gurbani. These Gutkas can vary from just a few pages to hundreds of pages and are used by the Sikhs to read these Banis on a daily basis.

== Compilation ==
Painting of Bhai Mani Singh (left) scribing Gurbani alongside Guru Gobind Singh dictating (right), artwork kept at Takht Damdama Sahib

Gurbani is not seen as mere intellectual, spiritual writings conjured by the Sikh gurus, bhagats, bhatts, and gursikhs, but rather as divine word revealed by the creator itself. As per Guru Arjan regarding the origin of gurbani:

Bani originated from the Primordial One (dhurki bani), and removes all anxiety.

— Guru Arjan, The Sikh View on Happiness: Guru Arjan’s Sukhmani (2020), page 36

== Nitnem compositions ==
The hymns of the Japji Sahib, Jaap Sahib, Tav-Prasad Savaiye, Chaupai Sahib and Anand Sahib should be read before sunrise daily according to the Sikh Rehat Maryada. These are recited by initiated Sikhs at Amritvela (before 6 a.m.). Rehras is read in the evening around sunset or after a day's work and finally Kirtan Sohila is read before going to bed. Doing Nitnem is also commonly referred as doing paath.

Japji Sahib, Anand Sahib, and Kirtan Sohila are a part of Guru Granth Sahib. Jaap Sahib, Tav-Prasad Savaiye, and Chaupai Sahib were all compiled by Guru Gobind Singh and found in the Dasam Granth. Rehras is a mix with hymns from both Guru Granth Sahib and Dasam Granth. A Sikh may add more Gurbani to their Nitnem and if done frequently that Gurbani becomes a part of their Nitnem.

A Pothi Sahib (Nitnem prayerbook) is commonly wrapped in a similar cloth as a mark of respect

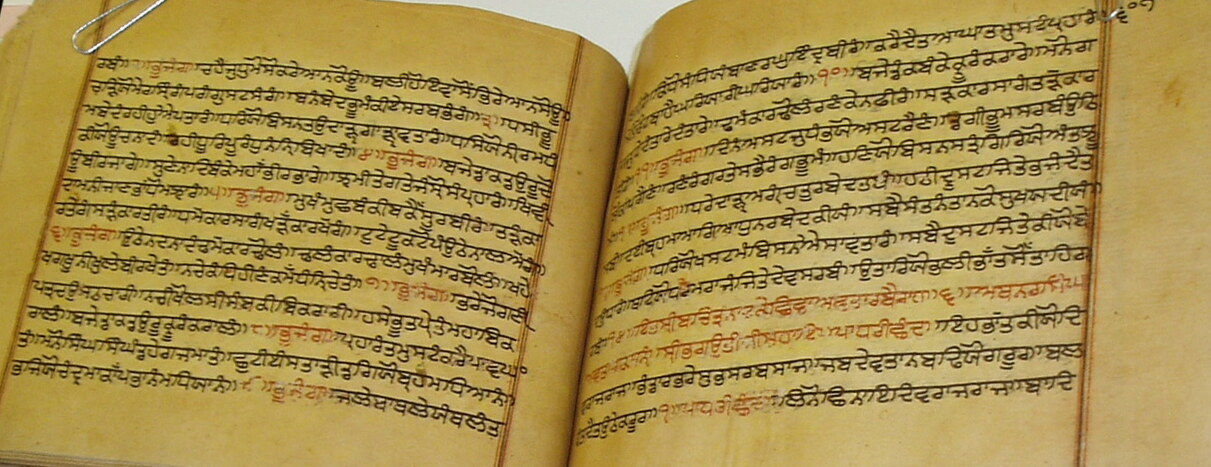
Historical gutka manuscript of the Dasam Granth from the 18th century

Sikh gutka from early 18th century

== See also ==
- Anand Sahib
- Guru Granth Sahib
- Panj Granthi
- Japji Sahib
- Nitnem
- Sikh scriptures
