= Sarbat da bhala =

Sikh term meaning blessings for everyone

Sarbat da bhala (Punjabi: ਸਰਬੱਤ ਦਾ ਭਲਾ (Gurmukhi); sarabata dā bhalā) is the final term in the Sikh prayer called the Ardas. It defines the wish for the betterment of all humanity, including both Sikhs and non-Sikhs.

== Description ==
The term outlines one of the most important of Sikh principles and is a point that is repeated in the Sikh Scriptures. The Sikh concept of sarbat da bhala which means "blessings for everyone" or literally "may everyone prosper". This statement is repeated by all practicing Sikhs at least twice daily as part of their Nitnem (daily prayers). This concept is central to Sikhism and forms a very important and essential role in the religious philosophy of the Sikh Gurus.

The Ardas ends with the line:

Nanak Naam Chardi Kala, teraa bhane sarbat da bhala.
Nanak, with Naam comes Chardi Kala and with your blessings, peace for everyone.

The term calls on the Sikh to request, pray and ask the Almighty for the well-being of all of humanity, prosperity for everyone (regardless of religion) in the worldwide community, global peace for the entire planet.

A Sikh selflessly prays daily for "all to prosper". This gesture comes from the clear and pure teaching of Gurbani (Sri Guru Granth Sahib) and forms the Gurmat code of conduct. Gurbani tells us that there are "no others", "there is only One". The same "One God resides within all". We are "all the children of that One God". As the potter makes pots of different forms and colors from the same basic clay; and as the goldsmith moulds jewellery of various types, colors and shapes from the same single homogeneous material, gold; similarly, we are all born of the same One Light: "There is no difference".

Sing the Praise of the One, the Immaculate Lord; He is contained within all. — Guru Granth Sahib, ang 706, line 30456

See the brotherhood of all mankind as the highest order of Yogis; conquer your own mind, and conquer the world. — Guru Granth Sahib, ang 6, line 292

Accordingly, by instruction from the Gurus, the true Sikh begs for "the good for all beings" of the world. Because he knows that within every one of us resides the same One God – the Sikh should realise that he is "one with the rest".

== Significance ==
The phrase Sarbat da Bhala (Punjabi: ਸਰਬੱਤ ਦਾ ਭਲਾ) translates to "welfare of all" and reflects a central tenet of Sikh philosophy. It is recited at the conclusion of the Sikh prayer Ardas, expressing a universal prayer for the well-being of all humanity, transcending religious, cultural, and social boundaries.

Scholars interpret Sarbat da Bhala not only as a spiritual aspiration but also as a social and ethical imperative rooted in the teachings of Guru Nanak. It is closely tied to the Sikh concept of seva (selfless service), which forms a foundation of Sikh practice. This is reflected in practices like Langar (community kitchens), where food is served to all regardless of background.

Historically, this principle has been exemplified by Sikh Gurus through advocacy for justice and protection of the oppressed. Guru Tegh Bahadur, for example, is remembered for sacrificing his life in defense of religious freedom. The formation of the Khalsa by Guru Gobind Singh is also seen as an institutionalization of the duty to uphold righteousness and defend others.

In modern times, the spirit of Sarbat da Bhala continues to inspire global Sikh humanitarian efforts—from disaster relief and food distribution to interfaith outreach and social justice campaigns.
