= Chhand =

Quatrain used in poetic traditions in India and Pakistan

Chhand (Punjabi: ਛੰਦ, Urdu: چھند, Hindi: छंद) is a quatrain used in the poetic traditions of North India and Pakistan.

== Chhands in culture ==
In the culture of the northwestern part of the Indian subcontinent, it is customary for chhands to be recited at ceremonial occasions such as weddings, where they are used by grooms to praise their in-laws. Formerly, the form was extensively employed by court bards to praise royal personages. Chhands are also used extensively in the Nautanki dance-drama tradition of the region, especially in the alha chhand or bir chhand formats. A typical Punjabi wedding chhand might extol the mother- and father-in-law, for instance this one, which says the groom holds them in the same esteem as his own parents -

Shahmukhi

چهند پراگا آ ًیے جا ًیے
چهند پراگا گهیوه
سس نوں منّا ماتا/امّی جی
تے سوهرے جی نوں پیوه

Devnagri

छंद परागा आईए जाईए
छंद परागा घ्योह
सस नूँ मन्ना माता/अम्मी जी
ते सोहरे जी नूँ प्योह

Transcription

chhand paraga aiyey-jaiyey
chhand paraga g(h)yoh
sass nun manna mata/ammi ji
te sohre ji nun pyoh

A Rajasthani language chhand, from the poem Haldighati by Kanhaiyalal Sethia, describes Maharana Pratap's determination to fight on against the Mughals at all costs -

Rajasthani

हूँ भूख मरूँ, हूँ प्यास मरूँ
मेवाड़ धरा आज़ाद रहै
हूँ घोर उजाड़ा में भटकूँ
पण मन में माँ री याद रह्वै

Transcription

hoon bhookh maroon, hoon pyaas maroon
mewar dhara azaad rahai
hoon ghor ujara mein bhatkoon
pan man mein ma ri yaad r'hvai

Translation

Let me die of hunger, let me die of thirst
Mewar must remain free
Let me wander the bleakest wildernesses
But the mother(land) must always be in my thoughts

== Chhands in religion ==
Jaap Sahib is the morning prayer of the Sikhs. The Prayer or Bani was composed by the tenth Sikh Master, Guru Gobind Singh. Jaap Sahib is made up of 199 verses and is the first Bani of the Dasam Granth (p. 1-10). The Jaap Sahib begins with "Sri Mukhwakh Patshahi Dasvee," "By the holy mouth of the Tenth King." This appears to be a specific saying to authenticate the writings of Guru Gobind Singh himself. The language of Jaap, is close to classical with words and compounds drawn from Sanskrit, Brij Bhasha, Arabic and Urdu. The contents of Jaap Sahib, are divided into various Chhands bearing the name of the related meter according to the then prevalent system of prosody in India.Jaap Sahib is a total and complete introduction to a non-individual Creator, or Nature itself, or the Forces of Universe, or the Laws of Nature.

== Etymology ==
The term is derived from the Sanskrit word chhanda, which refers to the study of Vedic meter. However, in North India and Pakistan, chhand has come to mean a specific poetic style associated with the modern languages native to the region, such as Punjabi, Hindko, Dogri, Hindustani, Gujarati and Rajasthani.

== See also ==
- Chaupai (poetry)
- Doha (poetry)
- Chaupai (Sikhism)
- Collection of Wedding Chhand - marriagesloks.blogspot.in
