= Dhanaula =

- Town
- Location in Punjab, India
- Coordinates: 30.28°N 75.58°E
- Country: India
- State: Punjab
- District: BARNALA
- Elevation: 228 m (748 ft)

Population (2011)
  - Total: 19,920

Languages
  - Official: Punjabi
- Time zone: UTC+5:30 (IST)
- Postal code: 148105
- Telephone code: 91 1679
- Vehicle registration: PB19

Dhanaula is a town and a municipal council in Barnala district in the state of Punjab, India. Situated 18 km west of Sangrur, Ranjit kaur Sodhi w/o Harwinder singh Sodhi is president of nagar council Dhanaula lies on the Sangrur-Barnala road. It is about 12 km from Barnala. Dhanaula was founded by Gurditta, eldest son of Taloka, in 1718 (1775 Bikrami). It was the capital of the erstwhile Princely State of Nabha until 1755 when Raja Hamir Singh founded Nabha town and made it the capital of the state. He also built a fort which now houses the police station of Dhanaula. A temple of Hanuman exists here. It is said that a man was digging a ditch and found an idol of Hanuman. A temple was constructed at that place, the idol was placed there, and the people began to worship it. Dhanaula is a town of temples.

A fair known as Hanuman Mela is held in this temple on every Tuesday. Dhanaula is known the wooden toys that are sold in shops on the main road to Barnala. There is also a special hospital for mentally upset patients. Dhanaula also has a name and fame due to animal fairs which are organised by Punjab government on 11th and 27th of every month. Traders across the country come here for their animal business deals. There are two main Gurudwaras, Gurudwara Ramsar Sahib and Gurudwara Pathsahi Nauvin. Gurdawara Pathsahi Nauvin is historical, and it is believed that Ninth Guru, Guru Teg Bahadur Sahib, visited Dhanaula.

In 1941, Dhanaula had a population of 9,560.

== Geography ==
Dhanaula is located at 30.28°N 75.58°E. It has an average elevation of 228 metres (748 feet).

== Demographics ==
As of the 2001 India census, Dhanaula had a population of 18,397. Males constitute 53% of the population and females constitute 47%. Dhanaula has an average literacy rate of 56%, lower than the national average of 59.5%: male literacy is 59%, and female literacy is 51%. In Dhanaula, 13% of the population is under 6 years of age. As per 2011 census, the population has increased to a total of 19,920 persons.

The table below shows the population of different religious groups in Dhanaula city, as of 2011 census.

Population by religious groups in Dhanaula city, 2011 census
| Religion | Total | Female | Male |
|---|---|---|---|
| Sikh | 14,017 | 6,606 | 7,411 |
| Hindu | 5,009 | 2,360 | 2,649 |
| Muslim | 815 | 398 | 417 |
| Christian | 67 | 28 | 39 |
| Jain | 1 | 1 | 0 |
| Buddhist | 1 | 1 | 0 |
| Other religions | 4 | 3 | 1 |
| Not stated | 700 | 2 | 4 |
| Total | 19,920 | 9,399 | 10,521 |

== Gallery ==
Entrance of Govt. Senior Secondary School (Boys) Dhanaula (Barnala)
