= Taloka =

Bhai Taloka was a GurSikh of Guru Arjan Dev, the fifth Sikh Guru. He was also a General in Nawab Ghazni's army. Once Nawab called a meeting of senior officers including Bhai Taloka. He told everyone in the meeting that tomorrow all of us will be going for hunting expedition into the forest taking only swords but no guns.

Next day, Bhai Taloka went to the forest as ordered by Nawab for hunting even though he did not want to kill any animal. The herd of deer passed in front of Bhai Taloka and he used his sword to kill the last female deer in the herd. The female deer died along with two of her unborn fawns. Bhai Taloka was very upset watching the tragic scene in front of him. His intention was to kill just one deer and not three! He went home and as it was nearly 5:30 pm, started to recite Rehras Paath; the scenes of the killed female deer and her unborn calves were flashing before his eyes and he could not concentrate on Paath. Just before falling asleep, Bhai Sahib ji recited Kirtan Sohila, and again the tragic scene of the three dead deer flashed continuously before his eyes.

He got up at Amrit vela and the same scene started flashing in his mind again. He asked Waheguru to forgive him for what he had done and he replaced his iron sword with a wooden sword. Someone complained to Nawab that your General Bhai Taloka is keeping wooden sword and what he would do if there is a battle to be fought. The Nawab did not believe the complainer but the complainer asked Nawab to check everyone's sword at the parade that morning. The complainer further told the Nawab that if Bhai Taloka carries a wooden sword then he should be punished else the Nawab could punish the complainer.

Nawab went to the parade and announced that he wished to inspect everyone's swords. He said that as he approached each soldier, they should present their sword. Bhai Taloka knew someone has complained because Nawab never came before to inspect their swords. Nawab started inspecting from soldier and lower rank officers and finally to General. Bhai Taloka immediately started doing Ardas to Waheguru.

Bhai Taloka's Ardas was accepted. When Nawab came to inspect his sword, Bhai Taloka took out a shining iron sword out of the cover. The complainer was punished.
