= Sukhmani Sahib =

Set of hymns in the Guru Granth Sahib, the main scripture of Sikhism

Sukhmani Sahib ਸੁਖਮਨੀ ਸਾਹਿਬ
- Guru Granth Sahib
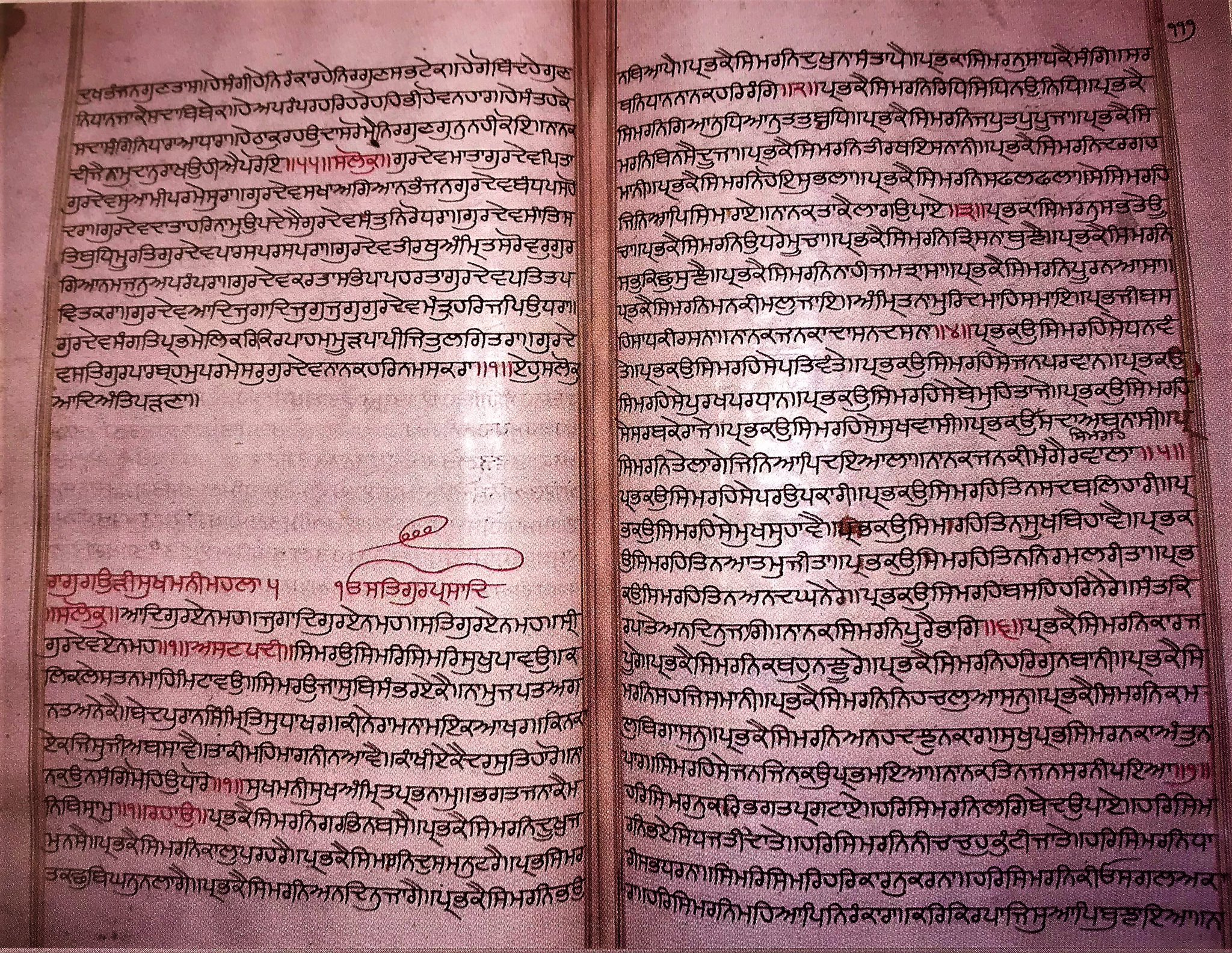
- Sukhmani Sahib chapter from an illuminated Guru Granth Sahib manuscript housed at Burhanpur, Madhya Pradesh, India

Information
- Religion: Sikhism
- Author: Guru Arjan
- Language: Mix of Punjabi and Braj
- Period: ca.1602

Sukhmani Sahib (Punjabi: ਸੁਖਮਨੀ ਸਾਹਿਬ), known under the title of Gauri Sukhmani in the scripture (named after the Gauri raga musical measure it belongs to), is usually translated to mean Prayer of Peace is a set of 192 padas (stanzas of 10 hymns) present in the holy Guru Granth Sahib, the main scripture and living Guru of Sikhism from Ang 262 to Ang 296 (about 35 count). This Gurbani text (writing of the Gurus) was written by the 5th Guru, Guru Arjan (1563–1606) at Amritsar in around 1602. Guru Arjan first recited the bani at Gurdwara Barth Sahib in the Gurdaspur district of Punjab, India.

== Content ==
The composition deals with such topics such as Simran (general meditation that leads to merging with God) and Nam Japna (meditation of Naam), the greatness of Saints and Sadh Sangat (holy congregation), true devotion, doing good deeds, the nature of the mind, the badness of slandering, concepts relating to Brahmvidya, Advaita, Sargun and Nirgun, materialism and death, Hukam, and other similar topics.

=== Recitation ===
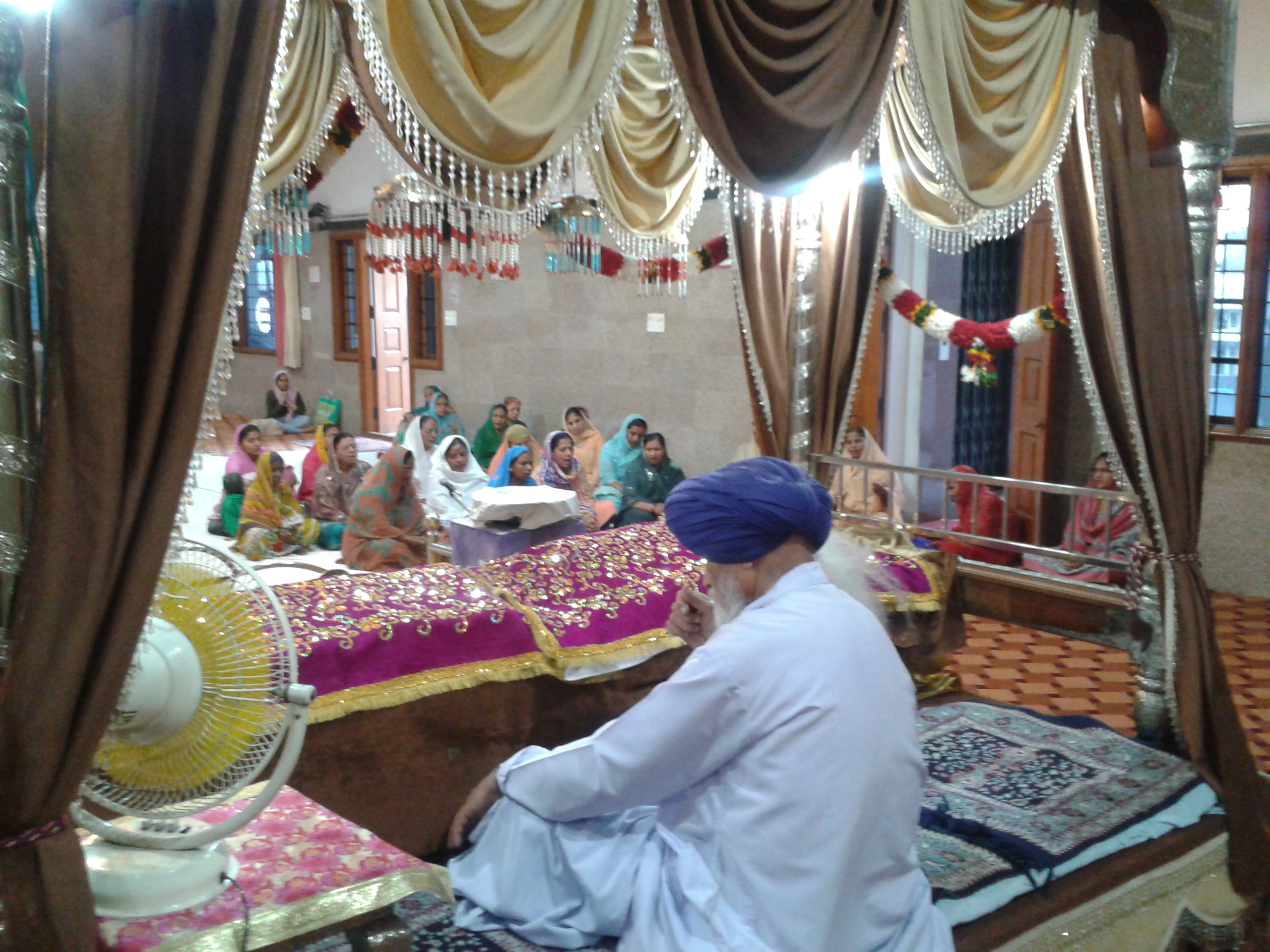
Sukhmani Sahib being recited as a group at Gurdwara Ameerpet, Hyderabad, India.

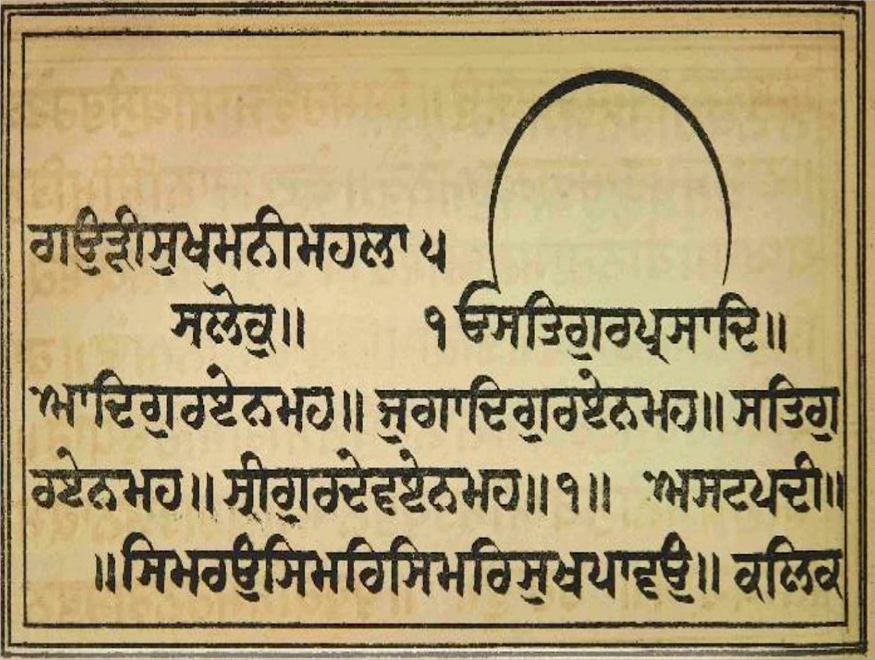
Folio containing part of the Sukhmani Sahib composition within a historical Panj Granthi manuscript

Sukhmani Sahib is frequently recited by Sikhs is one of the popular Banis (compositions of the Guru). It can be done individually or as a group usually in either a place of worship (Gurdwara) or at home. Reciting the entire Sukhmani Sahib takes about 60 to 90 minutes, and is sometimes undertaken by everyone in a smaller congregation with turn by turn reading. Reciting the Gurbani of Sukhmani Sahib is believed to bring peace to one's mind and aid help remembering God constantly.

=== Form ===
Sukhmani Sahib belongs to the Raag Gauri with Gauri meaning pure. The term Sukhmani comprises two words: Sukh (peace) and Mani (the treasure or jewel of the mind). It typically is found in Gutka form (small prayer book).

==== Structure ====
Sukhmani Sahib is divided into 24 Ashtpadi (Section). The Ashtpada is the Sanskrit word for a verse that has eight (Asht) metrical feet (pādi). Before the Ashtpadi begins there is a Salok of two lines and then each Ashtpadi contains eight padas of 10 hymns per pada.

== History ==
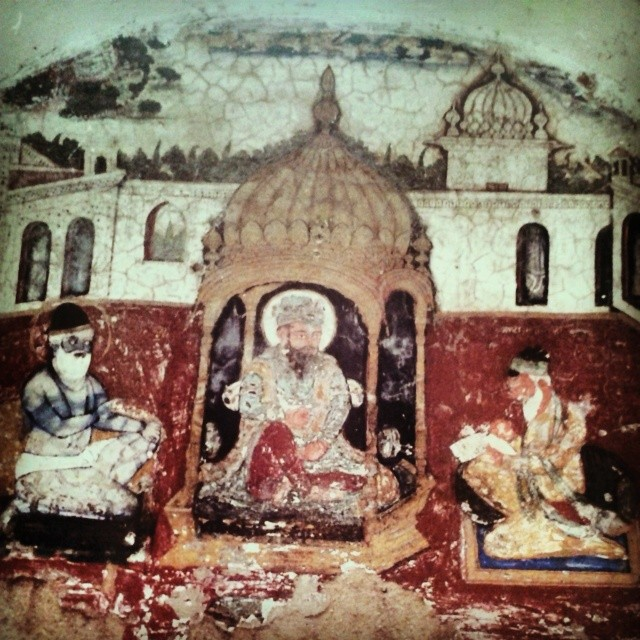
Mural from Gurdwara Ramsar Sahib of Sri Chand meeting Guru Arjan and Bhai Gurdas at Amritsar whilst the Sukhmani Sahib is being composed. The mural has been whitewashed and is no longer extant

Sukhmani Sahib was composed by Guru Arjan around 1602 before he compiled the Adi Granth. The Guru compiled it at Ramsar Sarovar (Sacred pool), Amritsar which at the time was in thick woods.

It is believed Sri Chand came to Amritsar to meet Guru Arjan and he engaged in the creation of Sukhmani. The Guru had written 16 canto and requested Sri Chand to finish the composition. Sri Chand out of humility only recited the Salok from the Mul Mantar by Guru Nanak, his father. Therefore this Salok was put by the Guru in the start of the 17 canto.

Prominent Sikh saint Baba Nand Singh would tell Sikhs to recite Sukhmani Sahib twice daily.
