= Nitnem =

Daily prayers in Sikhism

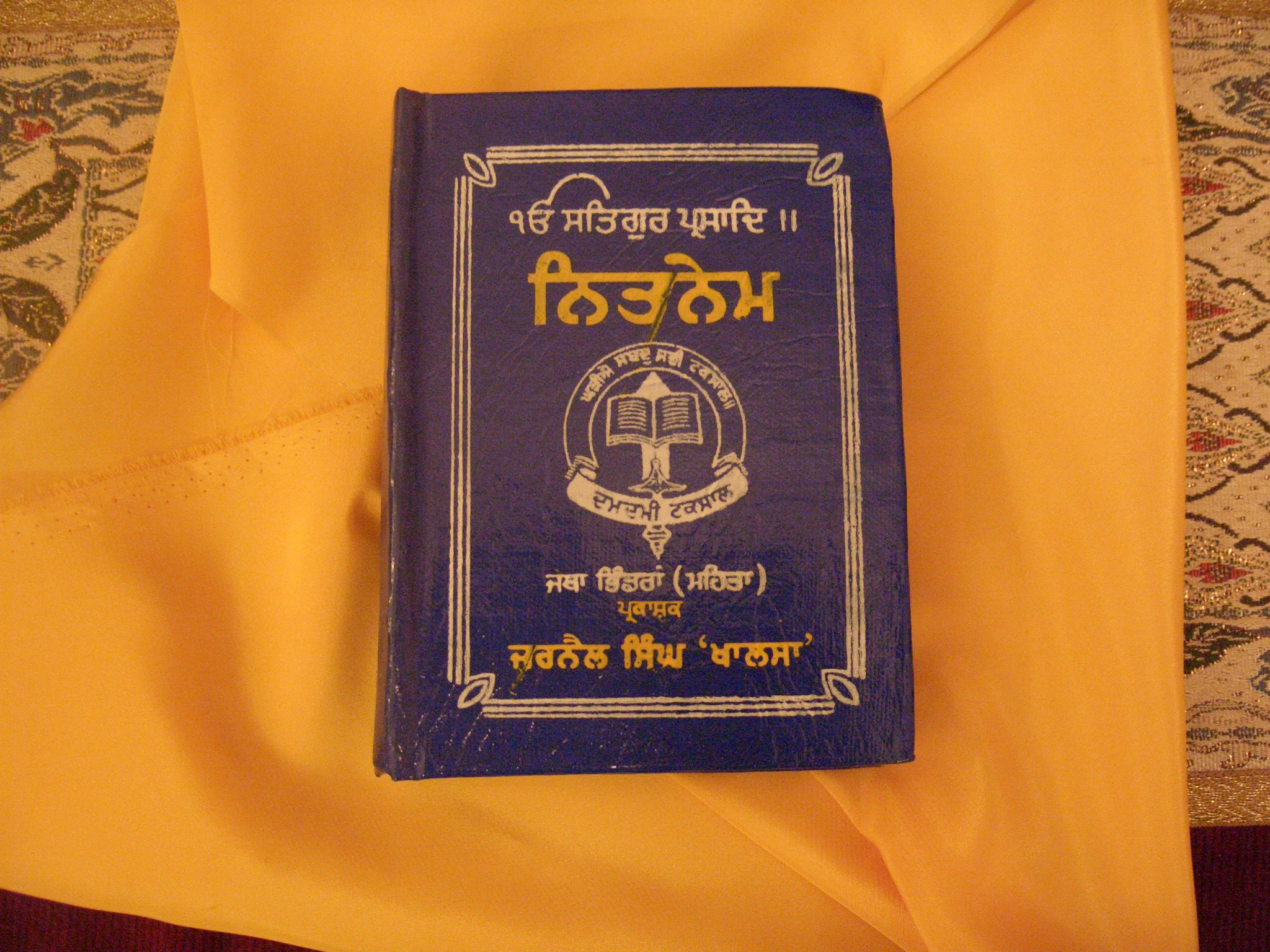
A typical Nitnem "Gutka", or Sikh Prayer book, extremely common in many Sikh households

Nitnem (Punjabi: ਨਿਤਨੇਮ, lit. 'daily routine') is a collection of Sikh hymns (Gurbani) to be read minimally 3 different times of the day. These are mandatory and to be read by every Amritdhari Sikh as expressed in the Sikh Rehat Maryada (the official Sikh Code of Conduct which acts as the ultimate "rulebook" for Amritdhari Sikhs). Optionally additional prayers may be added to a Sikh's nitnem. There are three hymns which are officially mandated by the Sikh Rehat Maryada to be recited at Amrit Vela (early hours of the morning between 2AM and 6AM), although two more are commonly recited alongside these, forming the 5 Baania (5 hymns). The Rehras Sahib hymn is also mandated in the evening, followed by Kirtan Sohila at night. The morning and evening prayers should be followed by an Ardaas.

== Five Banis ==
The initiated Sikh is asked by the Panj Piare during the Amrit Sanchar ceremony to recite the following 5 banis (Punjabi: ਪੰਜ ਬਾਣੀਆਂ, romanized: paja bāṇī'āṁ) as a commitment to the Sikh Gurus and Waheguru. The banis are also recited daily, starting in the early morning (Amrit Vela). However, through time, the "five banis" has come to mean different things to different groups of Sikhs.

Officially, the 5 Baani refers to Japji Sahib, Jaap Sahib and Tav Prasad Savaiya (morning), Rehraas Sahib (evening) and Kirtan Sohila (before bed)- this is the Sikh Rehat Maryada's definition. But some minority sects within Sikhism who do not accept the Sikh Rehat Maryada's authority claim that "5 Baani" refers to the 5 hymns recited at the Amrit Sanchar ceremony, which are to be recited every morning at Amrit Vela, in addition to Rehras Sahib and Kirtan Sohila in the evening and night, respectively. These groups' definition of "Five hymns" (5 Baani) counter-intuitively makes them recite 7 hymns daily instead of five

== Morning prayers ==
- Japji Sahib
- Jaap Sahib
- Tav-Prasad Savaiye
- Chaupai Sahib
- Anand Sahib

As per the Sikh Code of Conduct, Sikhs are only required to recite Japji Sahib, Jaap Sahib, & the Ten Sawayyas in the morning. Many Sikhs, including those who follow the lifestyle of sects such as the Damdami Taksal & AKJ, believe that Chaupai Sahib & Anand Sahib are also required in the morning prayers. Sometimes this is referred to as the Five Banis. These prayers are recited between 2 and 6 AM. These morning prayers are required to be followed by the Ardas.

However, most Sikhs (even the majority of Amritdharis who follow the Sikh Rehat Maryada) will still recite Chaupai Sahib and Anand Sahib as part of their morning prayers, despite knowing that they are not required to. This is because although the minimum number of morning prayers to be recited at Amrit Vela is 3, recitation of more hymns and Sikh scripture (Gurbani) is always welcomed and encouraged for all Sikhs. Therefore, the majority of Amritdhari Sikhs worldwide do recite a total of 7 prayers daily, identical to those sects who mandate this practice, such as AKJ and the Damdami Taksal - however, this is strictly out of personal desire to recite more hymns, not due to obligation.

== Daytime prayers ==
Five Banis can also refer to Japji Sahib, Jaap Sahib, & the Ten Sawayyas in the morning, along with Rehras Sahib and Kirtan Sohila in the evening, which are the five minimum prayers to be recited daily by any amritdhari Khalsa Sikh, as per the Sikh Code of Conduct.

== Evening prayer ==
- Rehras Sahib
- Ardas

This prayer is recited after sunset and takes about 8–12 minutes to recite. This evening prayer is required to be followed by the Ardas.

== Night prayer ==
- Kirtan Sohila Sahib

Some Sikh traditions also include the recitation of Rakhya De Shabad (hymns of divine protection) before Kirtan Sohila, especially within certain Taksal and Nihang lineages. These shabads are selected verses from the Guru Granth Sahib and Dasam Granth that express trust in the protection of Waheguru and seek spiritual and mental reassurance before resting. While not universally practiced across all Sikh communities, this addition is considered a way of preparing the mind for peaceful sleep and reinforcing a sense of divine guardianship throughout the night. This prayer is recited before going to bed and takes about 5–12 minutes to recite. This night prayer is not required to be followed by the Ardas.

== Other prayers ==
Nitnem is typically read from a gutka (Sikh Prayer book) or pothi (wider rectangular book), of which the main forms are the Panj Granthi (5 main scriptures from Guru Granth Sahib) and the Das Granthi (main scriptures from Dasam Granth). The Sundar Gutka (A larger gutka containing a mix of many compositions, lit. Beautiful Gutka) is also common in Sikh households.

Other prayers commonly read are:

- Sukhmani Sahib
- Asa di Vaar
- Aarti
- Sidh Gosti
- Uggardanti
- Shabad Hazare Patshahi 10

== See also ==
- Guru Granth Sahib
- Panj Granthi
- Sukhmani Sahib
- Amrit Vela
- Meditation
- Simran
- Dasam Granth
