= Panj Granthi =

Booklet containing chosen hymns from Guru Granth Sahib

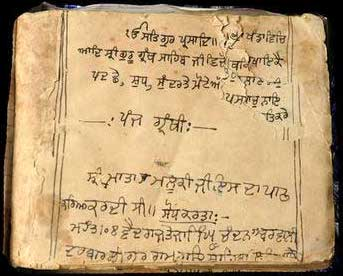
A handwritten Panj Granthi manuscript (nitnem pothi) belonging to Mata Malooki (died 1701), wife of Ram Rai

A Panj Granthi (Gurmukhi: ਪੰਜ ਗ੍ਰੰਥੀ, romanized: Paja grathī, lit. 'five books'), also known as Pañj Granth Ādi, is a small booklet which contains five hymns chosen from Guru Granth Sahib.

== Description ==
The Guru Granth Sahib is very sacred so it can only be recited in a prescribed ritualistic manner. Small anthologies called Gutka Sahib or Panj Granthi began to be made for recitation of certain hymns in private setting. They are usually small and easily fit in the hand of a person. Nowadays, the title 'Panj Granthi' has become a misnomer as a Panj Granthi may include more than five hymns from Guru Granth Sahib. A parallel booklet known as 'Das Granth' also exists which exclusively contains chosen compositions from Dasam Granth.

== History ==
Grierson describes in 1916 that it consisted of "eight devotional books of the Sikhs, consisting of selections from the Ādi Granth". In the second half of the 19th century, a number of Panj Granthi printed editions were published, including at Lahore (1874, 1878, 1879, 1881, 1882, 1885, 1886, all in Gurmukhi), Gujranwala (1875, 1879, all in Perso-Arabic script), and Amritsar (1895, Perso-Arabic script).

== Das Granthi ==
Das Granthi (Gurmukhi: ਦਸ ਗ੍ਰੰਥੀ, romanized: Dasa grathī, lit. 'ten books') is a small religious booklet containing only few selected compositions from Dasam Granth. Das stands for Ten and Granthi stands for booklet. It means Booklet of 10th Guru of Sikhism. This booklet was created for beginners and lay readers for reading these compositions in daily liturgy for proper understanding.

There is no standardization of this booklet and various sects in Sikhism have their own versions. The Shiromani Gurdwara Parbandhak Committee contains eight texts namely, Jaap, Bachitra Natak, Chandi Charitra I, Shabad Hazare Patshahi 10, Akal Ustati, Chandi Charitra 2, Gian Prabodh and Chandi di Var.
