= Anand Sahib =

Collection of Sikh hymns

Anand Sahib (Gurmukhi: ਅਨੰਦ ਸਾਹਿਬ anada sāhiba) is a collection of hymns in Sikhism, written in the Ramkali Raag by Guru Amar Das, the third Guru of the Sikhs. It appears on pages 917 to 922 in Guru Granth Sahib Ji. The word Anand means complete happiness.

== Synopsis ==
The Anand Sahib is a part of the Nitnem (daily prayers) which are read by Amritdhari Sikhs before dawn. Anand Sahib is chanted at all the religious ceremonies of the Sikhs irrespective of the nature of the event. There are two versions of Anand Sahib: one which extends 40 pauries and one shorter version often called Chhota Anand Sahib which comprises the first five pauries and then skips to the last one. This shorter version of Anand Sahib is usually recited at the closing ceremonies before Ardas. The Chhota Anand Sahib is included at the end of Rehras Sahib.

Anand Sahib, alongside Panj Granthi's (five chosen texts) Dakhni Oankar and Sidh Gosht are written in Raga Ramkali—the Raga of the coincides with part of the night before sunrise or perhaps the first part of the day after sunrise.

=== History ===
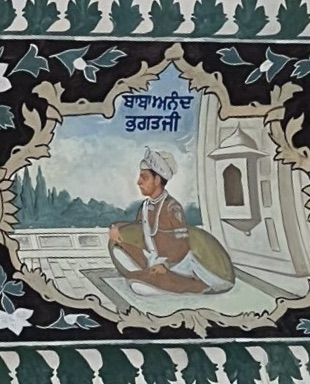
Fresco of Baba Anand (grandson of Guru Amar Das) from above the entrance of the Baoli Sahib located in Goindwal. He was named after the composition by the Guru

The Anand Sahib was composed by Guru Amar Das, whom, according to Sikh legend, composed it around the time he got news of the birth of his grandson, Baba Anand, whom is believed to have been a reincarnation of the soul of a yogi who met Guru Amar Das in a previous life. Baba Anand was personally named after the composition by the Guru.
