= Gagan mein thaal =

Prayer composed by Guru Nanak

Gagan mai thaal is an Aarti (prayer) in Sikh religion which was recited by first guru, Guru Nanak. This was recited by him in 1506 or 1508 at the revered Jagannath Temple, Puri during his journey (called "Udasi") to east Indian subcontinent. This arti is sung (not performed with platter and lamps etc.) daily after recitation of Rehraas Sahib & Ardās at the Darbar Sahib, Amritsar and at most Gurdwara sahibs. However, it is common among Nihangs to recite “Aarta” before aarti which is a composition of prayers from each banis in Dasam Granth and to use lamps, flowers, conch shells, bells, incense at different parts of the ceremony “sankhan kee dhun ghantan kee kar phoolan kee barakhaa barakhaavai”. This form of arti is also recited at Patna Sahib and Hazur Sahib. This form of Sikh aarti is the most common aarti at Ravidassia gurdwaras.

== Text and translation ==
Guru Nanak Dev Ji has imagined the entire universe decorated as a prayer platter on the altar of the almighty. The starting verses of the aarti are as follows :

=== Original Gurumukhi text and Roman transliteration (ISO 15919) ===
ਧਨਾਸਰੀ ਮਹਲਾ ੧ ਆਰਤੀ
ੴ ਸਤਿਗੁਰ ਪ੍ਰਸਾਦਿ ॥
dhanāsarī mahalā 1 āratī
ੴ satigura prasādi ..

ਗਗਨ ਮੈ ਥਾਲੁ ਰਵਿ ਚੰਦੁ ਦੀਪਕ ਬਨੇ ਤਾਰਿਕਾ ਮੰਡਲ ਜਨਕ ਮੋਤੀ ॥
gagana mai thālu ravi candu dīpaka banē tārikā maṇḍala janaka mōtī ..

ਧੂਪੁ ਮਲਆਨਲੋ ਪਵਣੁ ਚਵਰੋ ਕਰੇ ਸਗਲ ਬਨਰਾਇ ਫੂਲੰਤ ਜੋਤੀ ॥੧॥
dhūpu malaānalō pavaṇu cavarō karē sagala banarāi phūlanta jōtī ..1..

ਕੈਸੀ ਆਰਤੀ ਹੋਇ ਭਵ ਖੰਡਨਾ ਤੇਰੀ ਆਰਤੀ ॥
kaisī āratī hōi bhava khaṇḍanā tērī āratī ..

ਅਨਹਤਾ ਸਬਦ ਵਾਜੰਤ ਭੇਰੀ ॥੧॥ ਰਹਾਉ ॥
anahatā sabada vājanta bhērī ..1.. rahāu ..

ਸਹਸ ਤਵ ਨੈਨ ਨਨ ਨੈਨ ਹੈ ਤੋਹਿ ਕਉ ਸਹਸ ਮੂਰਤਿ ਨਨਾ ਏਕ ਤੋਹੀ ॥
sahasa tava naina nana naina hai tōhi kau sahasa mūrati nanā ēka tōhī ..

ਸਹਸ ਪਦ ਬਿਮਲ ਨਨ ਏਕ ਪਦ ਗੰਧ ਬਿਨੁ ਸਹਸ ਤਵ ਗੰਧ ਇਵ ਚਲਤ ਮੋਹੀ ॥੨॥
sahasa pada bimala nana ēka pada gandha binu sahasa tava gandha iva calata mōhī ..2..

ਸਭ ਮਹਿ ਜੋਤਿ ਜੋਤਿ ਹੈ ਸੋਇ ॥
sabha mahi jōti jōti hai sōi ..

ਤਿਸ ਕੈ ਚਾਨਣਿ ਸਭ ਮਹਿ ਚਾਨਣੁ ਹੋਇ ॥
tisa kai cānaṇi sabha mahi cānaṇu hōi ..

ਗੁਰ ਸਾਖੀ ਜੋਤਿ ਪਰਗਟੁ ਹੋਇ ॥
gura sākhī jōti paragaṭu hōi ..

ਜੋ ਤਿਸੁ ਭਾਵੈ ਸੁ ਆਰਤੀ ਹੋਇ ॥੩॥
jō tisu bhāvai su āratī hōi ..3..

ਹਰਿ ਚਰਣ ਕਮਲ ਮਕਰੰਦ ਲੋਭਿਤ ਮਨੋ ਅਨਦਿਨੋ ਮੋਹਿ ਆਹੀ ਪਿਆਸਾ ॥
hari caraṇa kamala makaranda lōbhita manō anadinō mōhi āhī piāsā

ਕ੍ਰਿਪਾ ਜਲੁ ਦੇਹਿ ਨਾਨਕ ਸਾਰਿੰਗ ਕਉ ਹੋਇ ਜਾ ਤੇ ਤੇਰੈ ਨਾਮਿ ਵਾਸਾ ॥੪॥੧॥੭॥੯॥
kripā jalu dēhi nānaka sāriṅga kau hōi jā tē tērai nāmi wāsā ..4..1..7..9..

=== Translation ===
Dhanasri 1st Guru, Present adoration..
There is but One God. By True Guru's grace, He is obtained..
In the sky's salver, the Sun and the Moon are the lamps and the stars with their orbs, are the studded pearls..
The fragrance of sandal wood make Thy incense, wind Thy fan and all the vegetation Thy flowers, O Luminous Lord..1..
What a beautiful worship with lamps is being performed? Such is Thine adoration O Lord, the Destroyer of dread..
The celestial strain is the sounding of template drums..1.. Pause..
Thousands are Thine eyes, yet thou hast no eye. Thousands are Thine forms, yet Thou hast not even one..
Thousands are Thine holy feet, yet Thou hast not one foot. Thousands are Thine noses and yet Thou art without a nose. I am bewitched by these plays of Thine..2..
Amongst all there is light and that light art Thou..
By His Light, the light shines within all the souls..
By Guru's teaching the Divine light becomes manifest..
Whatever pleases Him, that is His real worship..3..
My soul is bewitched by the honey of the lotus feet of God and, night and day, I am thirsty for them..
Bless Nanak, the pied cuckoo, with the Nectar of Thine mercy, so that he may have an abode in Thy Name, O Lord..4..1..7..9..

— Translated by Bhai Manmohan Singh
