= Dakhni Oankar =

Discourse in Guru Granth Sahib between Guru Nanak and priest of Omkareshwar

Dakhni Oankar is a composition by Guru Nanak which is present in Guru Granth Sahib. It consists of 54 stanzas. The composition is known as 'Dakhani Oankar' because it is a discourse between the priest of Omkareshwar Temple in Dakhan (South). The priest's name was Chatur Das. This composition is between Ang 929 to 938 of Guru Granth Sahib.
