= Akal Ustat =

Sikh composition from the Dasam Granth

Akal Ustat ਅਕਾਲ ਉਸਤਤਿ
- Dasam Granth
- ← Jaap Sahib Bachitar Natak →
- Akal Ustat composition of Guru Gobind Singh inscribed on a plate of the 'Charaina' (translates to “four mirrors”) body armour worn by Guru Gobind Singh in the battle of Bhangani, ca.1688

Information
- Religion: Sikhism
- Author: Guru Gobind Singh
- Verses: 271 and a half

Akal Ustat (Punjabi: ਅਕਾਲ ਉਸਤਤਿ, pronounced [aːkaːl ʊsteːti], lit. ‘the praise of the Timeless One’), is the name given to the second Bani (sacred composition) present in the second holy scripture of the Sikhs called the Dasam Granth. It is composed of 271 verses, and is largely devotional in nature. The Akal Ustat was completed in 1677 as per the Chaupa Singh Rehitnama.

== Synopsis ==
The word "Akal" means the "timeless primal being" and the word "Ustat" (from the Sanskrit stuti) means "praise". Together, the words "Akal Ustat" mean "the praise of the Timeless One". The scripture praises God through phrases such as Akal Purakh (meaning 'the Timeless Primal Being') and Sarbloh (meaning 'the Lord of all Steel').

In the Akal Utstat, Guru Gobind Singh, the tenth Sikh Guru, writes that God is worshipped by various peoples in many different ways, and with varying names and methods:

He is an Inconceivable Entity, External and Attire-less. He is without attachment, colour, form and mark. He distinct from all others of various colours and signs. He is the Primal being, Unique and Changeless.(3) He is without colour, mark, caste and lineage. He is the without enemy, friend, father and mother. He is far away from all and closest to all. His dwelling is within water, on earth and in heavens.(4)

— (Guru Gobind Singh, Akal Ustat, verse 3 to 4)

The scripture is notable for its unalloyed disavowal of the caste system, and of cultural elitism in general. At various points in this composition, Guru Gobind Singh speaks out against the belief that some people are superior to others, by virtue of belonging to a particular religion, region, history, culture, colour or creed. Instead, he clearly and firmly states that "all human beings are equal ":

Someone is Hindu and someone a Muslim, then someone is Shia, and someone a Sunni, but all the human beings, as a species, are recognized as one and the same.

— (Guru Gobind Singh, Akal Ustat, Verse 85-15-1)

Eternal God, thou art our shield, The dagger, knife, the sword we wield. To us Protector there is given The timeless, deathless Lord of Heaven; To us All-light's unvanquished might, To us All-time's resistless flight; But chiefly Thou, Protector brave All-steel, wilt Thine own servant save

Within the Manglacharan Puran, Guru Gobind Singh further does a Teeka of the Akal Ustat, as Baba Binod Singh had asked Guru Gobind Singh what the Bani meant in terms of spirituality.

Ritualism is criticized in the composition as an overemphasized method to reach God.

Parts of the work are read out during Amrit Sanchar baptismal ceremonies.

Occasional references are made to the Abrahamic mythology found within the Quranic texts and practices of Muslims. Most references in the work are directed at the corpus of Indic mythology.

Some Sikh writers have claimed that verses 211–230 of the work were not authored by Guru Gobind Singh, likely because they may be interpreted as praising the goddess Durga. Other Sikh scholars claim the composition is incomplete in its extant form and is missing parts.

Various regions and peoples of the world are mentioned in the world, some examples being China, Manchuria, Firangis (Europeans), Kandharis, Arabs, Quraishis, etc. The author describes them as worshipping the Lokeshwar ("Lord of Common") in their own ways and attributes the various languages of the world to the divine.

== Gallery ==
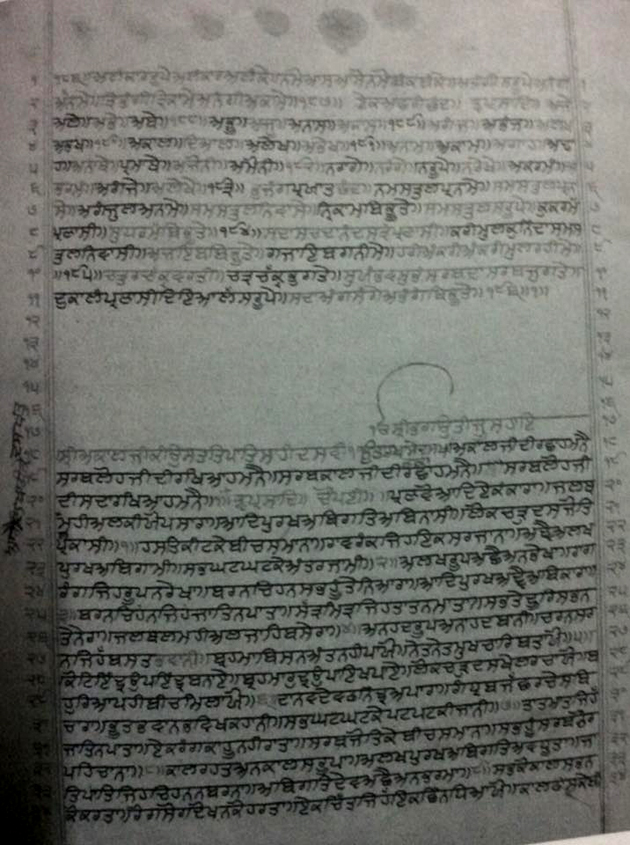
Concluding verses of Japu Sahib and opening verses of Akal Ustat - from the Anandpuri Hazuri bir (manuscript) of the Dasam Granth dated to the late 17th century

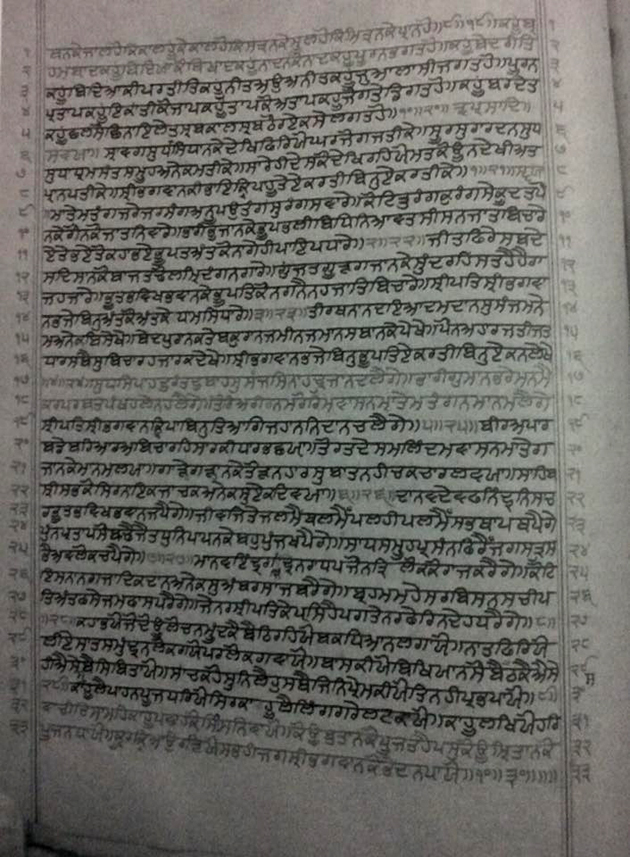
Verses of Akal Ustat - from the Anandpuri Hazuri bir (manuscript) of the Dasam Granth dated to the late 17th century

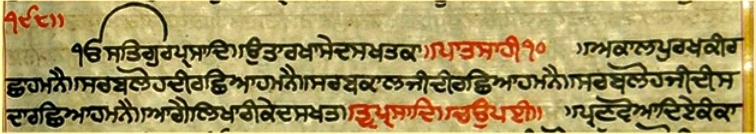
Detail of a page of a manuscript of the Sarbloh Granth showing verses of the Akal Ustat composition in a Teeka

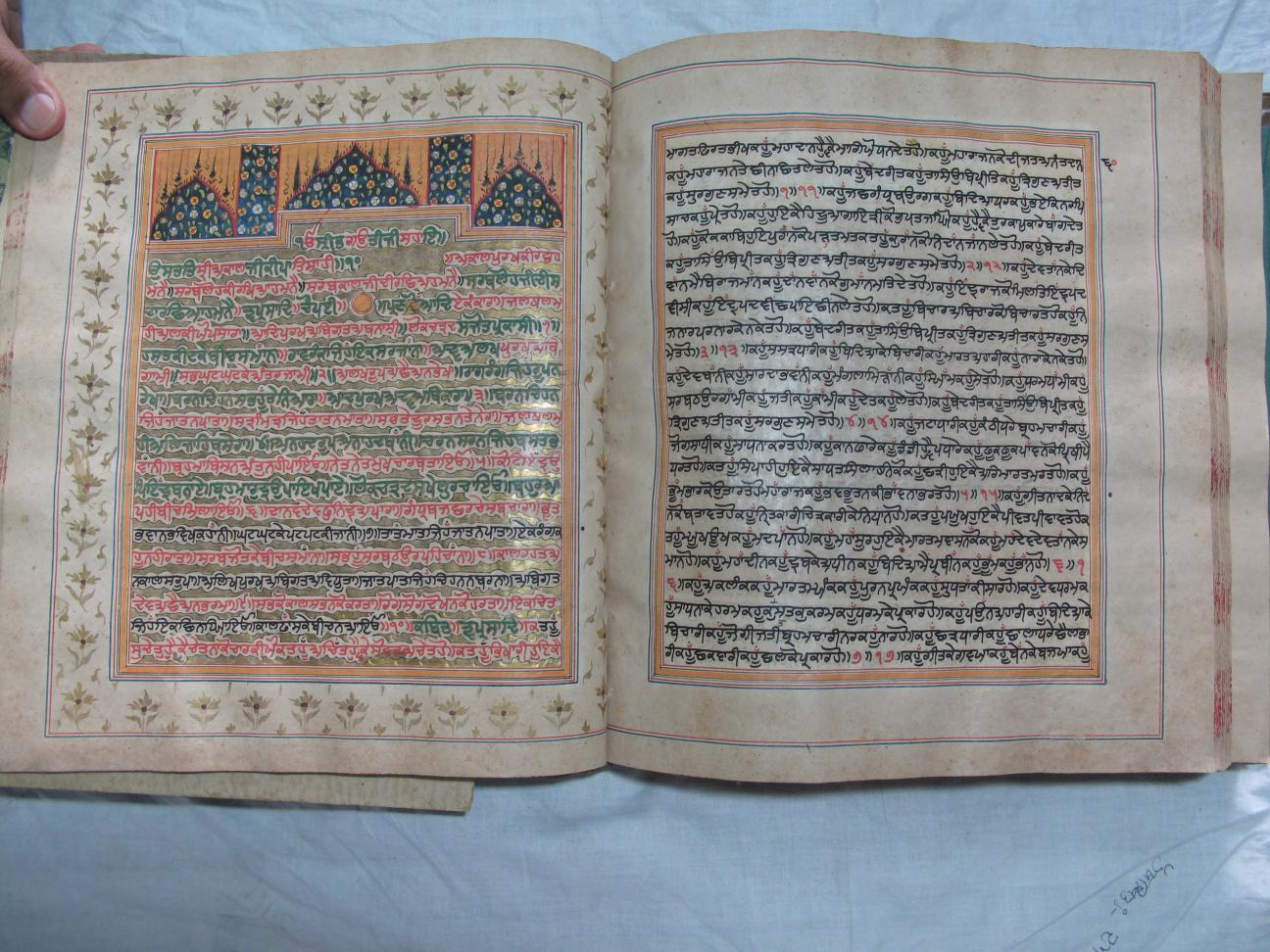
Akal Ustat from the 1765 "Patna Missal" Dasam Granth Manuscript

== Bibliography ==
- The Wondrous Play, Dr. Jodh Singh.
- The Life and Ideals of Guru Gobind Singh by Surindar Singh Kohli, 1986, Munshiram Manoharlal
