= Amrit Velā =

Religious time for reciting hymns in Sikhism

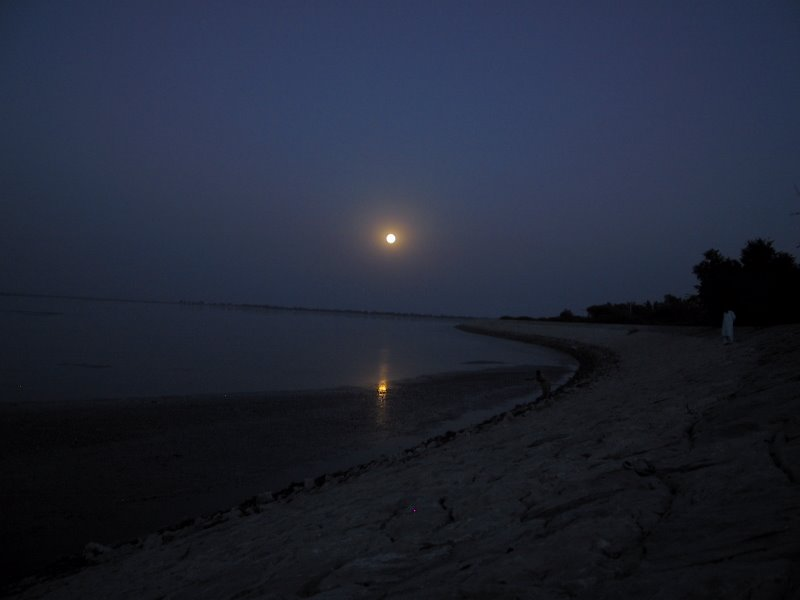
Amrit Vela is an important time for Sikhs.

Amrit Velā (Punjabi: ਅੰਮ੍ਰਿਤ ਵੇਲਾ, pronunciation: [əmɾɪt̪ᵊ ʋeːläː], lit. 'never ending time') does not refer to a specific time. According to the pahar system of time, most Sikhs typically interpret this time to start at around 3:00 a.m. Guru Nanak in the Japji Sahib (4th Pauri) says, "in amrit velā meditate on the grandeur of the one true Name". The importance of Amrit Vela is found throughout the Guru Granth Sahib. The Guru Granth Sahib states that "those who consider themselves a Sikh must wake up daily at Amrit vela and be in tune with the Naam (the Lord's Name)"

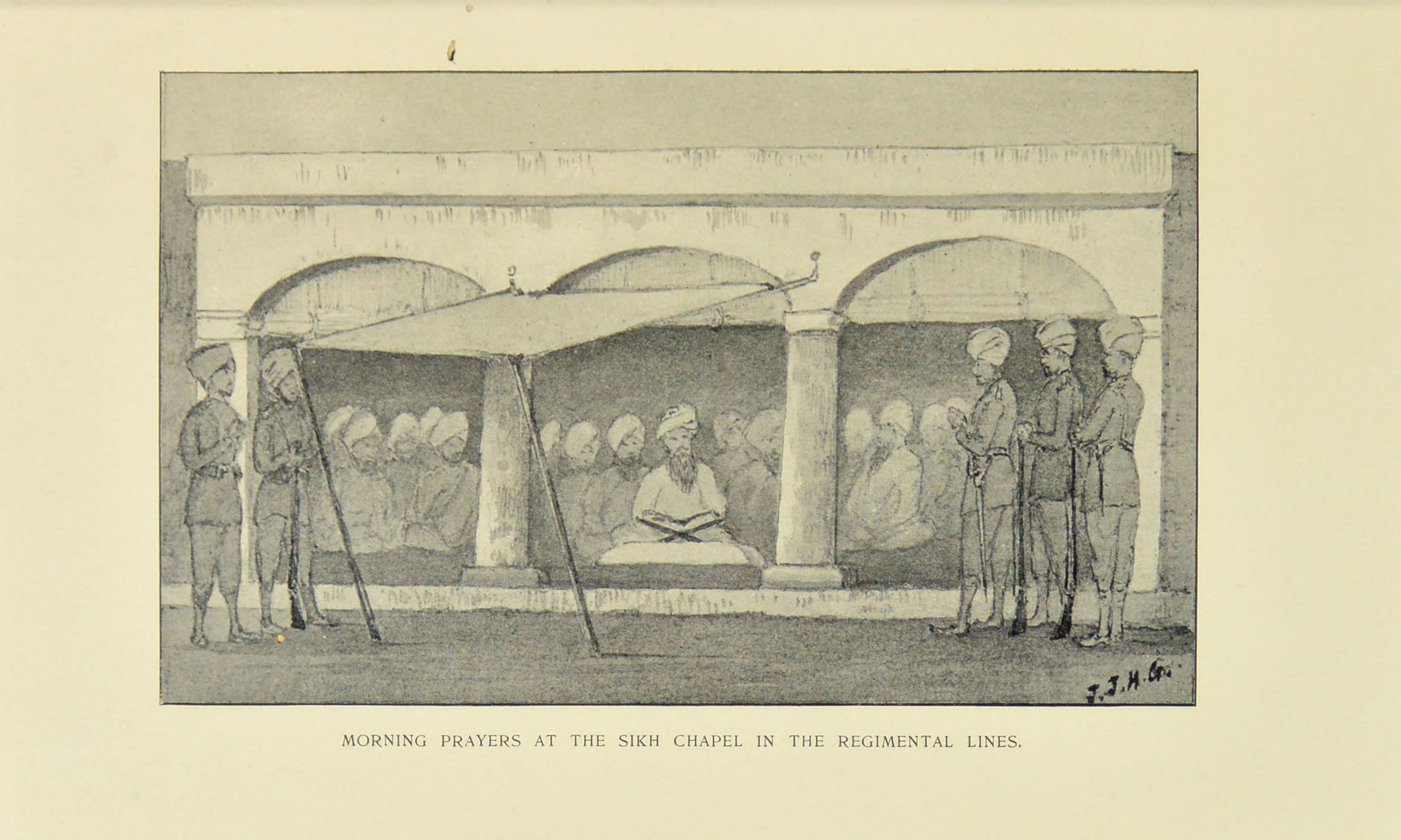
Illustration titled 'Morning prayers at the Sikh chapel in the regimental lines' from The Sikhs (1904) by John James Hood Gordon

In the SGPC Sikh Rehat Maryada it is written to arise in the Amrit Velā, bathe, and meditate on the divine Naam (through Simran and Naam Japna). Here, Amrit Vela is defined as "three hours before the dawn". Sikhs recite their morning Nitnem during Amrit vela. Traditionally after Nitnem Sikhs meet with the Sangat (congregation) to recite Asa ki Var.

== See also ==
- Amrit
- Brahmamuhurta
- Khalsa
- Nitnem
- Simran
