= Jaap Sahib =

Sikh morning prayer

Jaap Sahib ਜਾਪੁ ਸਾਹਿਬ
- by Guru Gobind Singh
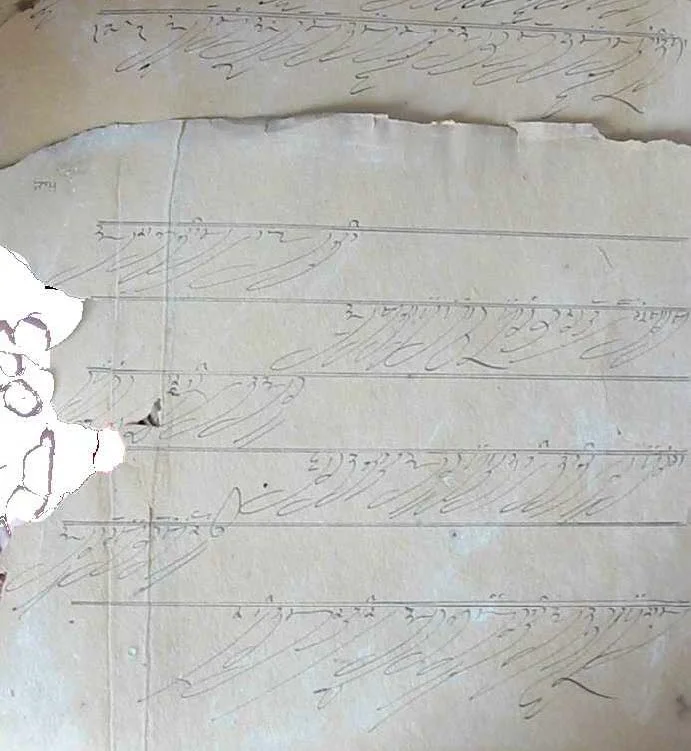
- The first page with the opening stanza of Jaap Sahib in the hand of Guru Gobind Singh
- Original title: Jaap (ਜਾਪੁ)
- First published in: Dasam Granth
- Country: Mughal Empire (Modern India)
- Language: Sant Bhasha (predominantly influenced by Hindi-languages [such as Braj, Kauravi], Sanskrit, Persian, and Arabic)
- Subject: Eulogy of Almighty
- Genre: Religion
- Meter: Chhand
- Lines: 22 stanzas comprising 199 verses in total
- Pages: Page 1-10 of Dasam Granth
- Followed by: Akaal Ustat

Jaap Sahib (or Japu Sahib; Punjabi: ਜਾਪੁ ਸਾਹਿਬ, pronunciation: [d͡ʒaːpʊ saːɦɪb]) is the morning prayer of the Sikhs. The beaded prayers were composed by the Tenth Sikh Guru, Guru Gobind Singh and is found at the start of the Sikh scripture Dasam Granth. This Bani is an important Sikh prayer, and is recited by the Panj Pyare while preparing Amrit on the occasion of Amrit Sanchar (initiation), a ceremony held to Amrit initiates into the Khalsa and it is a part of a Sikh's Nitnem (daily meditation). The Jaap Sahib is reminiscent of Japji Sahib composed by Guru Nanak, and both praise God. The Jaap Sahib was completed in 1677 as per the Chaupa Singh Rehitnama.

== Meaning of jaap ==
Following are some accepted meanings of jaap:

- The popular meanings of Jaap is to recite, to repeat, or to chant.
- Jaap also means to understand. Gurbani cites Aisa Giaan Japo Man Mere, Hovo Chakar Sache Kere, where Jaap means to understand wisdom.

Jaap is a Sanskrit word meaning "to utter in a low voice, whisper, mutter (especially prayers or incantations); to invoke or call upon in a low voice". Jaap Sahib is a rhythmic hymn composed like a necklace of pearls and gems, beauteously (beautifully) arranged around a string: the string is the Supreme God; the pearls and gems are His attributes, excellences, and glories. It basically helps reader do a daily Greetings to Waheguru in 199 verses, just like we do hello to each other. The glories sung by Guru Sahib revolve around the following attributes of God:

- God is metaphysical, beyond time, Eternal, Unborn, Uncreated, Self-existent, and without form, feature, colour or contour. Therefore, neither can God be described or depicted, nor can anyone make an image or idols of that which is undefinable.
- God's manifestations are universally pervasive. God cannot be confined to any particular place, land, country, religion, race, garb, body or name.
- God is the Creator of the Universe and the laws governing it. Never can anyone be outside the ambit of these laws nor can anyone have the power to oppose them. God's Law and Justice is Righteous and Ultimate.
- God's is pervasive in all that 'He' has created, yet God also extends beyond 'His' creations; God is thus Immanent in His Creation and at the same time Transcends it.
- God is Omnipotent, Omnipresent, and Omniscient; nothing, whether good or evil, can happen outside of the Creator's Will; God is the Creator-Sustainer-Annuller of His Creation. God is the Life of life, the Death of death, the Darkness of darkness, the Light of light.

== Content ==
The Jaap Sahib is a recitation and praise of God. It includes various names of God in various languages. Understand the fact that god has no name but is called by various names by devotees based on their experience and the blessings they have obtained from him. There is only one sole religion of humans - humanity, and the worldly path that we choose to understand the natural power, our source, source of creation - is called faith.

All faiths are rivers and flow into one "ocean - the Lord, the light"; whatever one may call, think, believe or perceive it to be.

== Form ==
Jaap Sahib is made up of 199 verses and is the first Bani of the Dasam Granth (p.1–10).

The Jaap Sahib, just like any other sikh composition, begins with the Mool Mantar and then the name of the composition and the author's signature:

ੴ ਸਤਿਗੁਰ ਪ੍ਰਸਾਦਿ।।
{Ik Oankar} Satgur Prasaad
Manglacharan

ਸ੍ਰੀ ਵਾਹਿਗੁਰੂ ਜੀ ਕੀ ਫਤਹਿ।।
Sri Waheguru Ji Ki Fateh
Victory is of The Lord,

ਜਾਪੁ।।
Jaap
Name of the composition,

ਸ੍ਰੀ ਮੁਖਵਾਕ ਪਾਤਿਸਾਹੀ {੧੦।।}
Sri Mukhwaak Patsahi Dasvee
From The Blessed Mouth Of The Tenth Emperor,

Jaap is a Sanskrit word which means "to utter in a low voice, whisper, mutter (especially prayers or incantations); to invoke or call upon in a low voice." The form of the word here is Japu, which makes it a noun, meaning "meditation on nothing but the Truth; ('God') (or The True God).

=== Structure ===
Jaap Sahib starts with opening invocation "ੴ ਸਤਿਗੁਰ ਪ੍ਰਸਾਦਿ।।", then comes the name of composition "ਜਾਪੁ।।", right after this is author's signature "ਸ੍ਰੀ ਮੁਖਵਾਕ ਪਾਤਿਸਾਹੀ ੧੦।।".

Jaap Sahib is structured into 22 stanzas which cycles through 10 chhand. Each poetic meter alters the pace, rhythm and mood of the prayer. These poetic meters are as follows:

Poetic Meters of Jaap Sahib
No.	Chhand	Verses	
No.	Chhand	From	To
1	Chhapay/ ਛਪੈ	1	1
2	Bhujang Prayat/ਭੁਜੰਗ ਪ੍ਰਯਾਤ	2	28
3	Chachari/ਚਾਚਰੀ	29	43
4	Bhujang Prayat/ਭੁਜੰਗ ਪ੍ਰਯਾਤ	44	61
5	Chachari/ਚਾਚਰੀ	62	63
6	Bhujang Prayat/ਭੁਜੰਗ ਪ੍ਰਯਾਤ	64	73
7	Charpat/ਚਰਪਟ	74	78
8	Ruaal/ਰੂਆਲ	79	86
9	Madhubhar/ਮਧੁਭਾਰ	87	93
10	Chachari/ਚਾਚਰੀ	94	95
11	Bhujang Prayat/ਭੁਜੰਗ ਪ੍ਰਯਾਤ	96	98
12	Chachari/ਚਾਚਰੀ	99	102
13	Bhagwati/ਭਗਵਤੀ	103	132
14	Chachari/ਚਾਚਰੀ	133	141
15	Charpat/ਚਰਪਟ	142	144
16	Rasawal/ਰਸਾਵਲ	145	149
17	Bhagwati/ਭਗਵਤੀ	150	160
18	Madhubhar/ਮਧੁਭਾਰ	161	170
19	Haribolmana/ਹਰਿਬੋਲਮਨਾ	171	184
20	Bhujang Prayat/ਭੁਜੰਗ ਪ੍ਰਯਾਤ	185	188
21	Aik Acchari/ਏਕ ਅਛਰ	189	196
22	Bhujang Prayat/ਭੁਜੰਗ ਪ੍ਰਯਾਤ	197	199

== Language ==
The language of Jaap, is close to classical with words and compounds drawn from Sanskrit, Brij Bhasha, Arabic and Urdu. The contents of Jaap Sahib, are divided into various Chhand bearing the name of the related meter according to the then prevalent system of prosody in India.

== Japji Sahib and Jaap Sahib ==
The Guru Granth Sahib starts with Japji Sahib, while Dasam Granth starts with Jaap Sahib also called Japu Sahib. Guru Nanak is credited with the former, while Guru Gobind Singh is credited with the latter. The Jaap Sahib, unlike Japji Sahib, is composed in Braj bhasha, Sanskrit and Arabic, and with 199 verses, is longer than Japji Sahib. The Jaap Sahib is, like Japji Sahib, a praise of God as the unchanging, loving, unborn, ultimate power.

== Bibliography ==
- Singh, Dr. Santokh (1990). English Transliteration and Interpretation of Nitnaym Baanees, Sikh Prayers for English Speaking Sikh Youth. Sikh Resource Centre. ISBN 1-895471-08-7.
- William Owen Cole, Piara Singh Sambhi (1995). The Sikhs: Their Religious Beliefs And Practises. Sussex Academic Press. ISBN 1-898723-13-3.
- Neki, Jaswant (2008). Basking in the Divine Presence - A Study of Jap Sahib. Amritsar: Singh Brothers.
- Singh, Sahib (2003). Jaap Sahib Steek. Amritsar: Singh Brothers.
