= Rehras =

Daily evening prayer in Sikhism

Rehras Sahib (Punjabi: ਰਹਿਰਾਸ ਸਾਹਿਬ, pronunciation: [ɾəɦɚaːs saːɦɪb], lit. “the way”; Rahirās), alternatively spelt Rahiras Sahib, commonly known as So dar Rehras, is the daily evening prayer of the Sikhs and is part of Nitnem. It includes hymns from Guru Granth Sahib Ji and Dasam Granth Ji.

It contains hymns of So Dar, So Purakh, a shortened version of Chaupai Sahib (the first 25 stanzas), swaiya 'paae gahe', dohra 'sagal duaar' a concise 6 stanza version of Anand Sahib, and Mundhavani with its concluding Salok, among which Chaupai Sahib is from the Dasam Granth Ji. This Bani is a collection of hymns of five Sikh Gurus: Guru Nanak Dev Ji, Guru Amar Das Ji, Guru Ram Das Ji, Guru Arjan Dev Ji and Guru Gobind Singh Ji.

== History ==
In the second half of the 19th century, a number of Rahiras Sahib printed editions (Pōthī Rahirās, consisting of the Sikh evening prayers, including selections from the Guru Granth Sahib and the Dasam Granth) were published as pothis, including at Lahore (1867, 1869, 1869 [with other inclusions from the Guru Granth Sahib], 1873, 1874, 1874 [with other inclusions from the Guru Granth Sahib, in Perso-Arabic script], 1875, 1878, 1879; and Amritsar (1893).

== See also ==
- Guru Granth Sahib
- Dasam Granth
