= Japji Sahib =

Sikh prayer

- by Guru Nanak
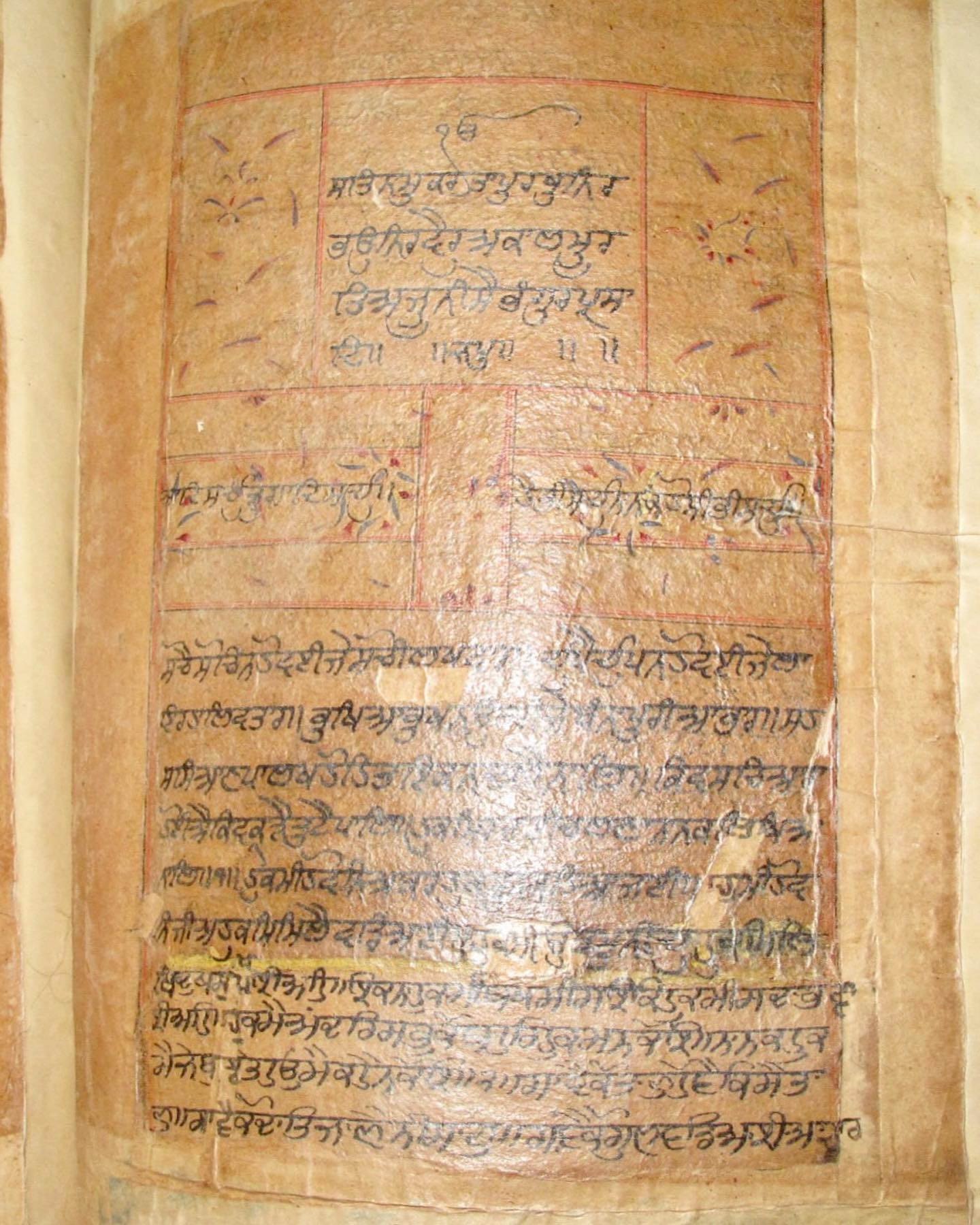
- Japji Sahib composition of the Kartarpur Bir written by Bhai Gurdas under the supervision of Guru Arjan, ca.1604
- Original title: ਜਪੁਜੀ ਸਾਹਿਬ or ਜਪੁ ਜੀ ਸਾਹਿਬ
- Written: 16th century
- First published in: Adi Granth, 1604
- Language: Gurmukhi
- Subject: Spirituality
- Genre: Religion
- Lines: 38 Stanzas
- Followed by: So Dar Aasa (ਸੋ ਦਰੁ ਰਾਗੁ ਆਸਾ ਮਹਲਾ ੧)

Japji Sahib (Punjabi: ਜਪੁਜੀ ਸਾਹਿਬ, pronunciation: [d͡ʒəpʊd͡ʒiː sɛː́b]; Japjī) is the Sikh thesis that appears at the beginning of the Guru Granth Sahib – the scripture of the Sikhs. Jap is the original name of the prayer and, to show respect, it is called Japji Sahib. It was composed by Guru Angad, and is mostly the writings of Guru Nanak. It begins with Mool Mantra and then follow 38 paudis (stanzas) and completed with a final Salok by Guru Angad at the end of this composition. The 38 stanzas are in different poetic meters.

Japji Sahib is the first composition of Guru Nanak, and is considered the comprehensive essence of Sikhism. Expansion and elaboration of Japji Sahib is the entire Guru Granth Sahib. It is first Bani in Nitnem. Notable is Nanak's discourse on 'what is true worship' and 'what is the nature of God'. According to Christopher Shackle, it is designed for "individual meditative recitation" and as the first item of daily devotional prayer for the devout. It is a chant found in the morning and evening prayers in Sikh gurdwaras. It is also chanted in the Sikh tradition at the Khalsa initiation ceremony and during the cremation ceremony.

Related to Japji Sahib is the Jaap Sahib (Punjabi: ਜਾਪੁ ਸਾਹਿਬ), the latter is found at the start of Dasam Granth and was composed by Guru Gobind Singh.

== Etymology ==
Japa (Sanskrit: जप) means the recitation of a mantra. The Sanskrit word japa is derived from the root jap-, meaning "to utter in a low voice, repeat internally, mutter".

Following are some accepted meanings of Jap:

- A conventional meaning for Jap(u) is to recite, to repeat, or to chant.
- Jap also means to understand. Gurbani cites Aisa Giaan Japo Man Mere, Hovo Chakar Sache Kere, where the word Jap means to understand wisdom.

== Content ==
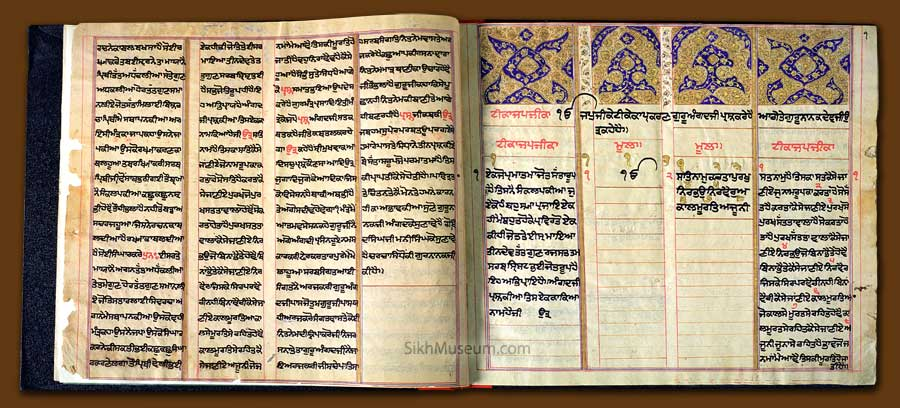
19th century commentary on the Japji Sahib

Mural of Guru Nanak presenting and chanting the Japji Sahib in the presence of Guru Angad with Bhai Bala to side with a fly-whisk, circa 19th century. The Mul Mantar is inscribed to the left.

The Japji Sahib’s first stanza or pauri states that one cannot be cleaned or stay clean by repeatedly taking bath at holy sites as the thoughts are not clean, by silence alone one cannot find peace as the thoughts come one after another in our mind, by food and all material gains alone one cannot satisfy one's hunger, to be purified one must abide in love of the divine. Hymn 2 asserts that by God's command the ups and downs in life happen, it is He who causes suffering and happiness, it is He whose command brings release from rebirth, and it is His command by which one lives in perpetual cycles of rebirth from karma.

With good karmas in past life and his grace is the gate to mukti (liberation); in him is everything, states verse 4. The verse 5 states that He has endless virtues, so one must sing His name, listen, and keep the love for Him in one's heart. The Guru's shabda (word) is the protecting sound and wisdom of the Vedas, the Guru is Shiva, Vishnu (Gorakh) and Brahma, and the Guru is mother Parvati and Lakshmi. All living beings abide in Him. Verse 6 to 15 describe the value of listening to the word and having faith, for it is the faith that liberates. God is formless and indescribable, state verses 16 to 19. It is remembering His name that cleanses, liberates states Hymn 20. Hymns 21 through 27 revere the nature and name of God, stating that man's life is like a river that does not know the vastness of ocean it journeys to join, that all literature from Vedas to Puranas speak of Him, Brahma speaks, Siddhas speak, Yogi speaks, Shiva speaks, the silent sages speak, the Buddha speaks, the Krishna speaks, the humble Sewadars speak, yet one cannot describe Him completely with all the words in the world.

Verse 30 states that He watches all, but none can see Him. God is the primal one, the pure light, without beginning, without end, the never changing constant, states Hymn 31.

== Japji Sahib and Jaap Sahib ==
The Guru Granth Sahib starts with Japji Sahib, while Dasam Granth starts with Jaap Sahib. Guru Nanak is credited with the former, while Guru Gobind Singh Ji is credited with the latter. Jaap Sahib is structured as a stotra that are commonly found in 1st millennium CE Hindu literature. The Jaap Sahib, unlike the Japji Sahib, is composed predominantly in Braj-Hindi and the Sanskrit language, with a few Arabic and Persian words, and with 199 stanzas making it longer than Japji Sahib. The Jaap Sahib is, like Japji Sahib, in praise of God as the unchanging, loving, unborn, ultimate power and includes within it 950 names of God, starting with Brahma, Shiva, Vishnu and moving on to over 900 names and avatars of gods and goddesses found in Hindu traditions, with the assertion that these are all manifestations of the One, the limitless eternal creator. This is similar to Sahasranama texts of India, and for this reason this part is also called as Akal Sahasranama. The text includes Arabic and Persian words for God such as Allah and Khuda. The Japu Sahib includes a mention of God as wielder of weapons, consistent with the martial spirit of Dasam Granth.

== History ==
In the second half of the 19th century, a number of Japji Sahib printed editions (Pōthi Japji) were published as pothis, including at:

- Lahore in 1865, 1868, 1871 (in Perso-Arabic script), 1872 (in Perso-Arabic script), 1873, 1873 (including other verses by Nanak from the Guru Granth Sahib), 1874, 1874 (in Perso-Arabic script), 1876, 1876 (with other verses by Guru Nanak), 1876 (with a Punjabi commentary by Bihārī Lāl), 1877, 1877 (with a commentary by Maṇi Siṅgh), 1877 (with a commentary by Paṇḍit Salgrām Dās), 1878 (in Perso-Arabic script), 1879, 1879 (with Maṇi Siṅgh's commentary); 1891 (with Bihārī Lāl's commentary), 1900 (with Maṇi Siṅgh's commentary).
- Amritsar in 1875, 1882
- Karachi in 1875 (in Khoja-Sindhī script)
- Sialkot in 1876 (in Perso-Arabic script), 1877, 1879 (in Perso-Arabic script)
- Rawalpindi in 1889 (with commentary of Hariprakās, entitled Bōdh-arthāvalī)
- The original text of the Japji Sahib was added as an addendix on Ernst Trumpp's translation of the Guru Granth Sahib (1877), published with spacing rather than the traditional scriptio continua

== Translations ==
Early translations include:

- Lahore, 1870: Translation of the Japji. Text in Perso-Arabic script, with a Hindustani translation and notes. Includes the Janamsakhis and Gurbilases.
- Lahore, 1878: same as the Lahore. 1870 translationLahore, 1870. The same, Lahore, 1878. With an interlinear translation in Hindōstānī,
- Gujranwala, 1879: Interlinear translation into Hindustani
- Gujranwala, 1879: Introduction and translation into Hindustani by Sardār 'Itr Siṅgh of Patiala
- Lucknow, 1887: Jap-paramārtha, an edition of the Punjabi text, with a Hindī translation and notes by Lakshmaṇ Prasād Brahmachārī
- Amritsar: 24 December 1897: A Circular Letter to the Sikhs, written by Max Arthur Macauliffe, includes a tentative translation of the Japji into English
- Amritsar: Translation of the Japji. By M. Macauliffe. Journal of the Royal Asiatic Society, 1900, pp. 43 ff. Letter printed at the New Anglo-Gurmukhi Press.

A Japanese translation of the text was carried out by Japanese scholar Tomio Mizokami, which was digitized by Jvala Singh. Satpal Singh produced an English poetic translation of the work in 2026.

== Gallery ==
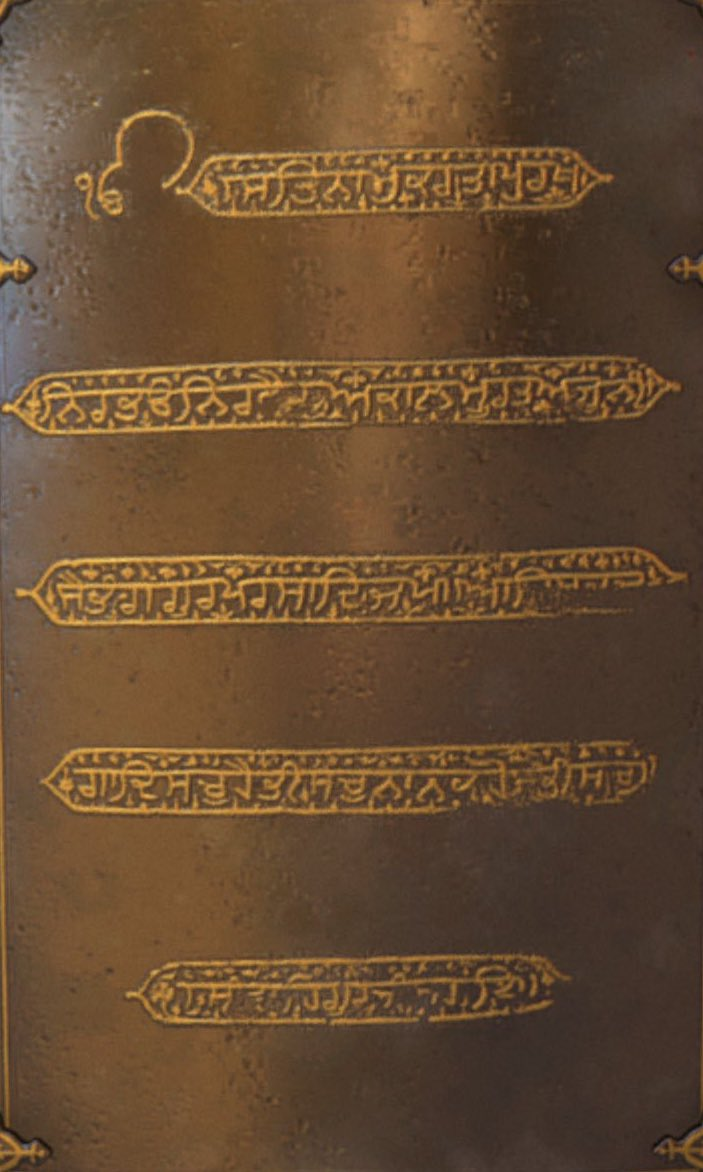
Japji Sahib composition of Guru Nanak inscribed on a plate of the 'Charaina' (translates to “four mirrors”) body armour worn by Guru Gobind Singh in the battle of Bhangani, ca.1688

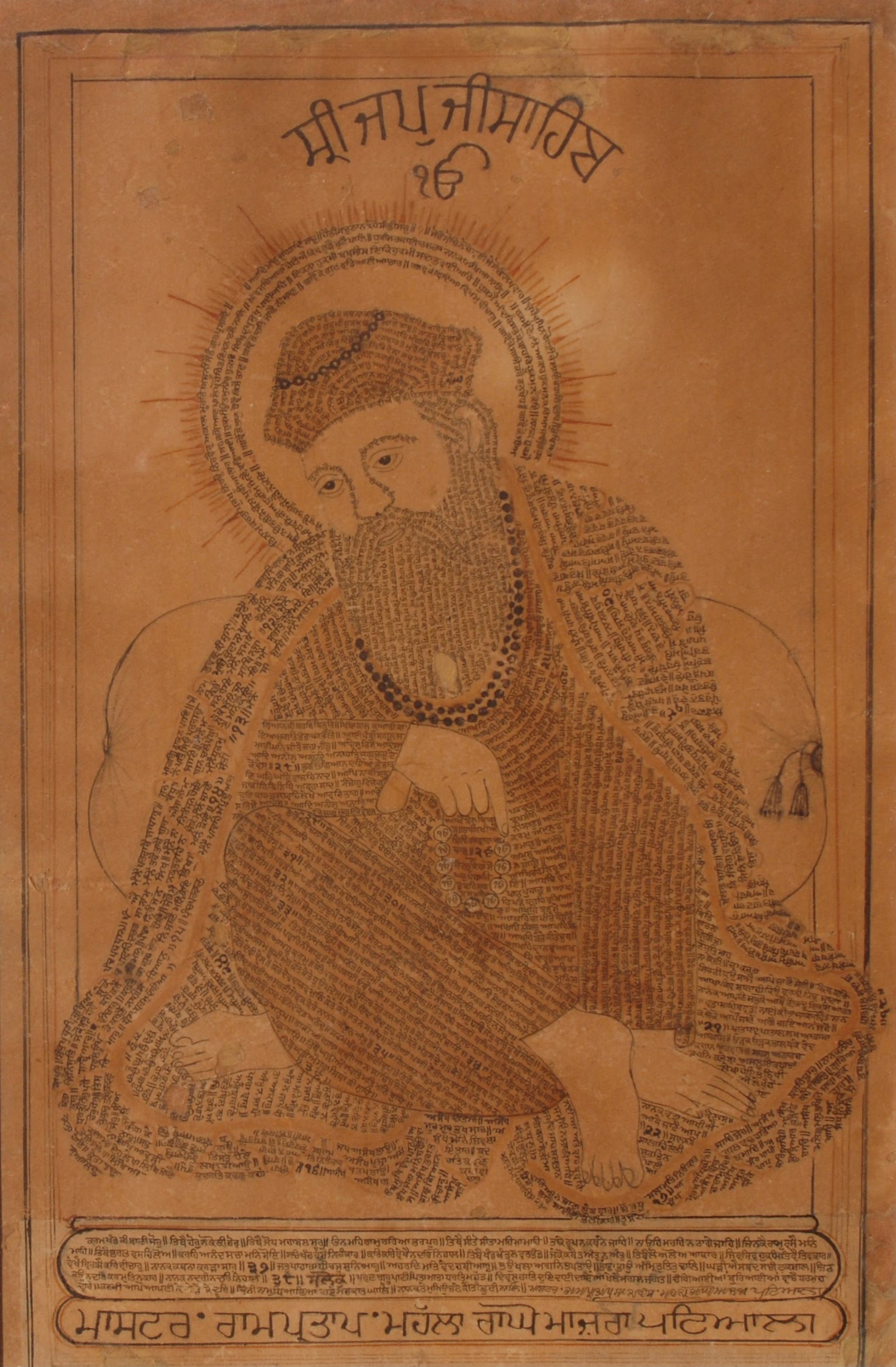
Artwork of Guru Nanak with Japji Sahib inscribed all over
