= Kirtan Sohila =

Night prayer in Sikhism

Kirtan Sohila (Gurmukhi: ਕੀਰਤਨ ਸੋਹਿਲਾ kīratana sōhilā), also known as the Arti Sohila (Ārtī-Sohilā) is a night prayer in Sikhism. Its name means 'Song of Praise'. It is composed of five hymns or shabad, the first three by Guru Nanak Dev, the fourth by Guru Ram Das and the fifth by Guru Arjan Dev.

This hymn is usually recited at the conclusion of evening ceremonies at the Gurdwara and also recited as part of Sikh funeral services, as a means to remind those in-attendance to accept that death is the ultimate truth. This hymn is also recited before sleeping during bedtime. The collection of hymns called Sohila is repeated at bedtime by Sikhs. It consists of three hymns of Guru Nanak, one of Guru Ram Das, and one of Guru Arjan. The word Sohila is derived from sowam wela or saana-na-wela meaning in the Punjabi and Pothwari language: the time for sleep.
