= Chaupai (Sikhism) =

Prayer composed by Guru Gobind Singh

Chaupai Sahib ਚੌਪਈ ਸਾਹਿਬ
- Dasam Granth
- ← Sri Charitropakhyan Zafarnama →
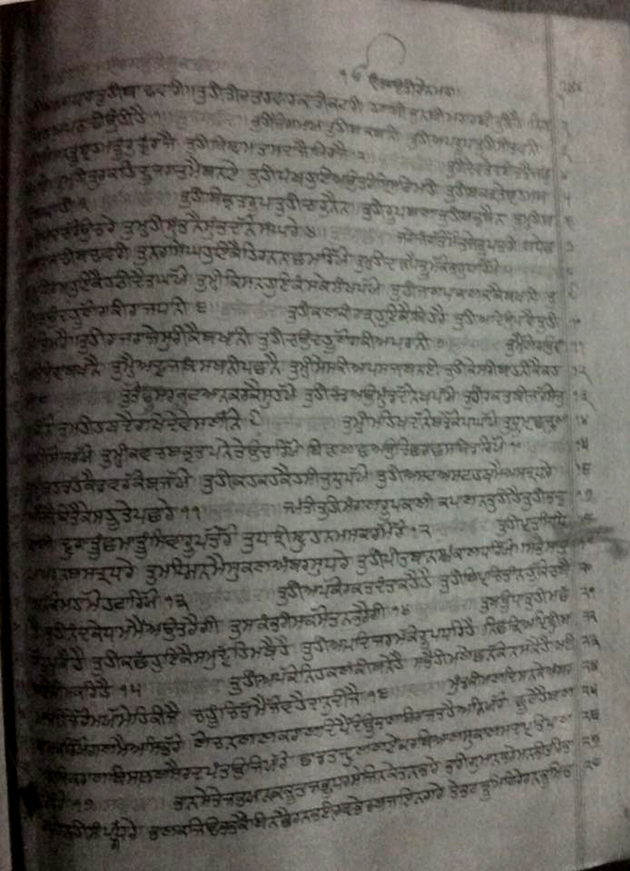
- Verses of Benti Chaupai - from the Anandpuri Hazuri bir (manuscript) of the Dasam Granth dated to 1698

Information
- Religion: Sikhism
- Author: Guru Gobind Singh
- Period: 1696

Kaviyo Bach Benti Chaupai (also referred to as Chaupai Sahib or simply as Benti Chaupai) (Gurmukhi: ਕਬਿਯੋਬਾਚ ਬੇਨਤੀ ਚੌਪਈ or ਚੌਪਈ ਸਾਹਿਬ) is a hymn by Guru Gobind Singh. Chaupai is the 405th Charitar of the Charitropakhyan composition contained within the Dasam Granth. It forms part of a Sikh's Nitnem (daily scripture reading) and is read during Amrit Sanchar ceremonies.

== Synopsis ==
Chaupai Sahib is an extension of the 405th charitar, where two massive battles, including the latter between "Mahakal" and various demons, is narrated, as well as the struggle of the goddess that was born as a result of the first battle, and her quest for the acceptance of the Supreme Being, by her abandoning all other worldly desires, is illustrated.

== Structure ==
Benti Chaupai consists of three parts: Kabiyo Bach Benti Chaupai, Arril, Chaupai, Savaiye, and Dohra. Kabiyo Bach Benti Chaupai is normally referred to as Chaupai in short. The Savaiya and the Dohra typically recited in Sikh Liturgy during the recitation of the Chaupai is not found in the Charitropakhyan, but comes at the end of the Ram Avtar subchapter in the Chaubis Avtar.

== Dating ==
Chaupai Sahib, as the author suggests, was completed on Sunday, on eighth day (Ashtami) of waxing moon phase (Shukla Paksha) of Lunar month of Bhadrapada in Vikram Samvat year 1753 (1696 A.D.).

The author says:

ਸੰਬਤ ਸੱਤ੍ਰਹ ਸਹਸ ਭਣਿੱਜੈ ॥
ਅਰਧ ਸਹਸ ਫੁਨਿ ਤੀਨਿ ਕਹਿੱਜੈ ॥
ਭਾਦ੍ਰਵ ਸੁਦੀ ਅਸਟਮੀ ਰਵਿਵਾਰਾ ॥
ਤੀਰ ਸਤੁੱਦ੍ਰਵ ਗ੍ਰੰਥ ਸੁਧਾਰਾ ॥੪੦੫॥

It was Vikram Samvat 1753 ..
This book was completed on banks of the Sutlej on Sunday, the eighth day of waxing moon phase of Bhadrapada ..405..

== Method and purpose ==
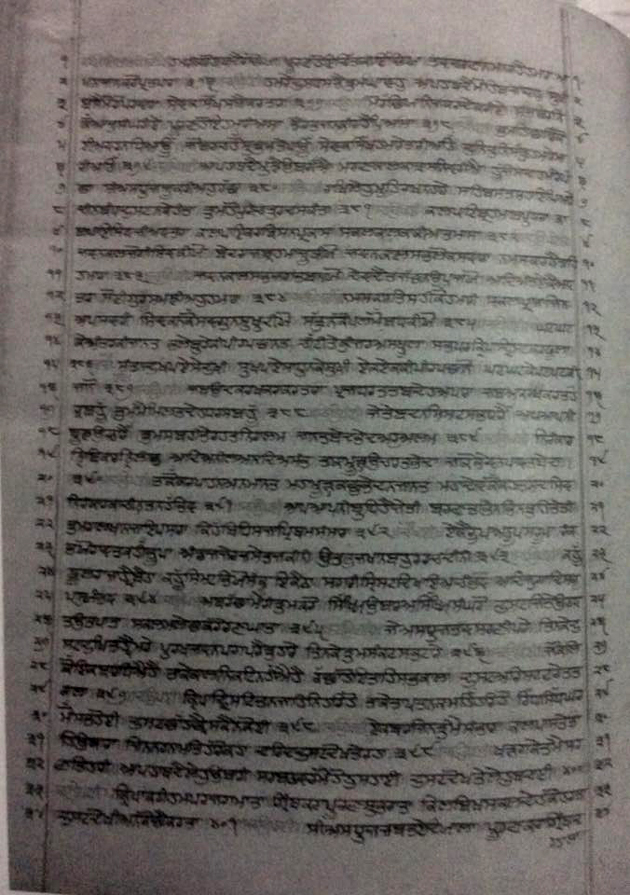
Verses of Benti Chaupai - from the Anandpuri Hazuri bir (manuscript) of the Dasam Granth dated to 1698

This hymn offers one protection and security and many Sikhs recite this Bani to gain spiritual safety and defense from external and internal enemies, worries and afflictions. The Gurmukhi gives one self-confidence and an upbeat feeling. This Bani gives one the feeling of reliability and dependability on the Lord.

According to the researchers: Gurinder Singh Mann, Leicester UK and Dr Kamalroop Singh, London, the Chaupai Sahib was completed at Gurdwara Bhabour Sahib, Nangal as the closure of Sri Charitropakhyan written by the Tenth Guru.
