= Machhiwara forest =

Historical jungle in Punjab, India

Machhiwara
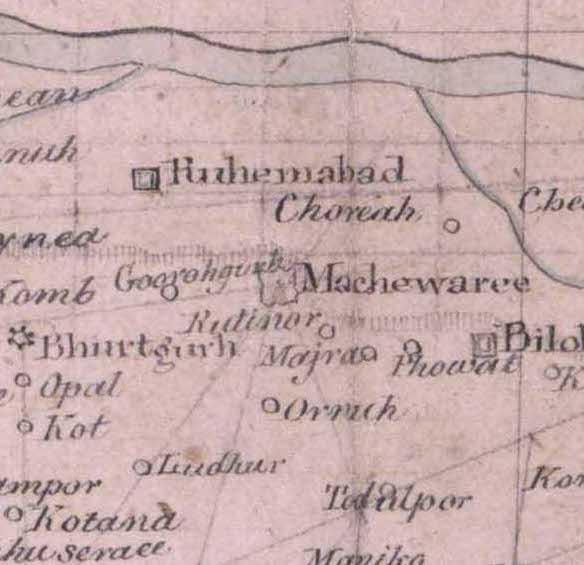
- Detail of the region of Machhiwara from a map of the country between Delhi and Ludhiana, surveyed by F. S. White, 1808

Geography
- Location: Ludhiana district, Punjab, India

Machhiwara, also spelled Macchivara, was a historical jungle located in the Punjab region near the bank of the Sutlej river near the present-day Ludhiana district in Punjab, India. The Machhiwara jungle should not be confused with the Lakhi Jungle that existed near Bathinda.

== Etymology ==
The name 'Machhiwara' is derived from machi, which is the Punjabi word for fish and came as a result of the fishermen who resided in the area.

== History ==
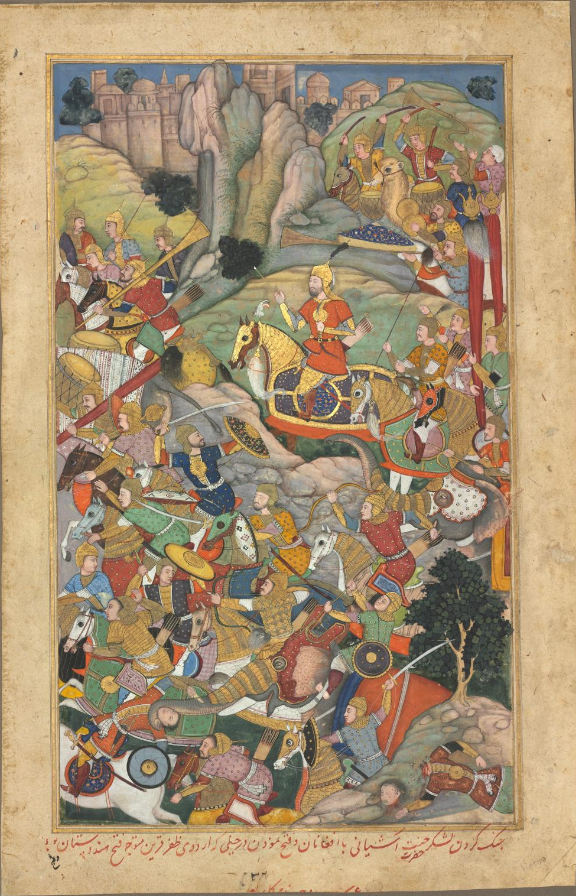
Illustration for the 1st Akbar-nama in the Cleveland Museum of Art, No. 1971.77. The Battle of Machhiwara in May 1555 is described on the reverse.

The jungle formed in a region near the bank of the Sutlej river. The jungle was filled with thorny vegetation and existed during the time period of Guru Gobind Singh. The jungle was located near a village, also called Machhiwara (now a town). In the aftermath of the Battle of Chamkaur, the tenth Sikh guru, Guru Gobind Singh, became separated from the rest of his entourage and became lost in the Machhiwara jungle after leaving from Chamkaur in December 1705. The guru was without food, shelter, or a mount during his trek through the jungle. He eventually reunited with three of his companions, Man Singh, Dharam Singh, and Daya Singh, in the garden of the village sharing the name of the jungle. The guru had chosen the garden outside the village as his resting place when he was come upon by his companions. Gurdwara Charan Kaval Sahib now marks the location of this village garden. A man named Gulaba Chand was the local masand of the Machhiwara area during the time of Guru Gobind Singh. Guru Gobind Singh stayed with Gulaba, who had a house in the Machhiwara village, where he stayed in a room on the first floor. Gurdwara Chubara Sahib now marks the location where Gulaba's house once was. Two Rohilla Pathan brothers who worked as horse dealers, named Ghani Khan and Nabi Khan, helped transport the guru whilst he was disguised as a Muslim holy man. The guru stayed at the family house of the Pathan brothers after staying in Gulaba's house. The familial house of the Pathan brothers is now marked by Gurdwara Uchch Da Pir. The group secretly disguised the guru as a Sufi Pir of Uch, carrying him in a palanquin, with the event known as Uch Da Peer. With the assistance of three Muslims, the group was able to evade Mughal patrols in the area. Eventually, the group made its way out of the area and reached Jatpura, where Rai Kalha, a local Muslim chieftain, received the Sikh guru.

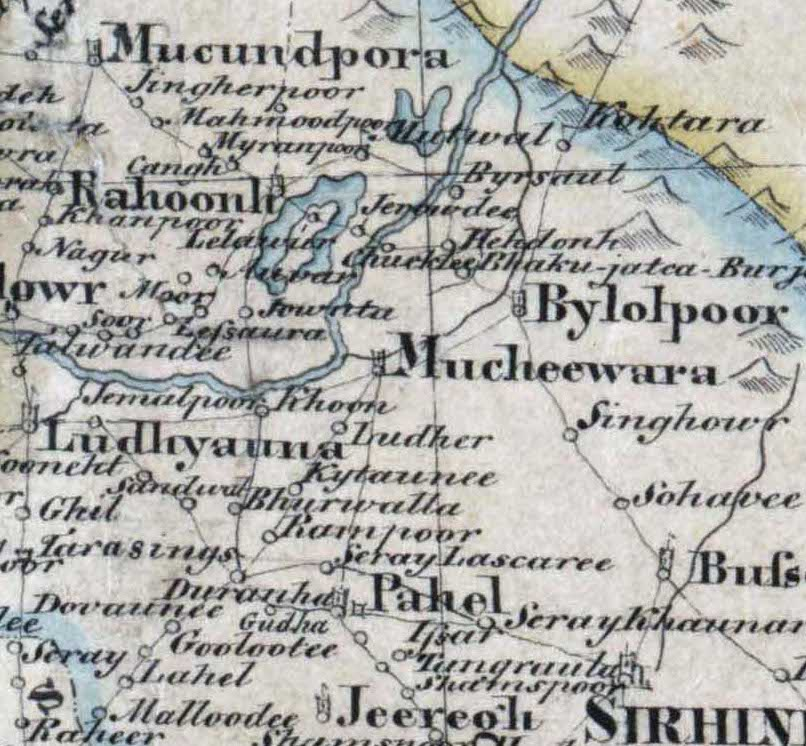
Detail of the region of Machhiwara from a map of the countries to the west of Delhi as far as Kabul and Multan, including the Punjab, surveyed by Mirza Mogul Beg between 1786 and 1796 for F. Wilford, compiled in 1804.

Some writings associated with Guru Gobind Singh are linked to the Machhiwara jungle and village. The Fatehnama letter is believed to have been composed within and dispatched from the area. Furthermore, the sixth hymn of Shabad Hazare, Mittar Pyare Nu, is believed to have been composed by the tenth Guru in the Machhiwara area after the deaths of all his sons. The Guru composed this work while leaning against a tree in the wilds of Machhiwara after having been wandering for days with only the soft leaves of the Akk plant (Calotropis gigantea) as sustenance, sleeping directly on the lumpy forest ground, suffering from foot blisters, wearing torn attire, and sustaining cuts from the thorny vegetation of the jungle. This composition forms the sixth stanza of the Shabad Hazare chapter of the Dasam Granth.

"Carry to the Beloved the message of His humble servant

Soft beds are to him like a disease, if thou are not with him

Living in the halls and mansions is like living among serpents, if thou art away

Wine cups hurt him like the sword and things of comfort kill,

as does the butcher's knife, if thou art not with him

In the companionship of the friend, turf is superior to soft beds,

accursed are the places if thou art away."

— Guru Gobind Singh, Shabad Hazare, Dasam Granth, translation from 'History of Sikh Gurus Retold: 1606-1708 C.E' (2007), pages 833–834, by Surjit Singh Gandhi

The Nihangs favour the dark blue colour for their clothing, which they adopted to emulate Guru Gobind Singh's attire when he escaped from Chamkaur through the Machhiwara jungle.

The Machhiwara jungle, alongside the Lakhi jungle, were both used as hide-outs by Sikhs during periods of active oppression and active genocide, such as by the Mughal government. Punjab used to have many thick forests that were used as safe-spots for Sikhs.

=== Present ===
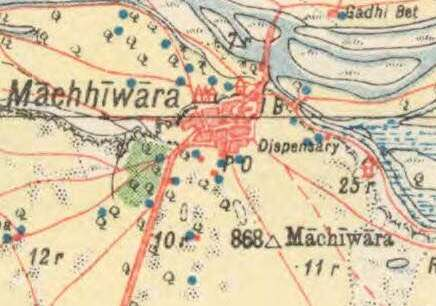
Small tract of remaining jungle of Machhiwara forest, Survey of India geographical block-map for 53 B NW Nabha (1917)

The jungle no longer exists for the most part, having been deforested, however surviving remnants can be found in the graveyard located to the north-east direction of the Government Girl School.

Some have connected the surviving Mattewara forest with the historical Machhiwara jungle.

The Machhiwara jungle that existed during Guru Gobind Singh's time, which was cut down in the subsequent centuries, is planned to be revived by the SGPC through the planting of samplings on gurdwara land the organization owns within the locality to revive the lost jungle.

== See also ==
- Battle of Machhiwara
- Guru Gobind Singh Marg
- Buddha Nullah
- EcoSikh
