= Harnam Das Udasi =

Udasi leader and scholar

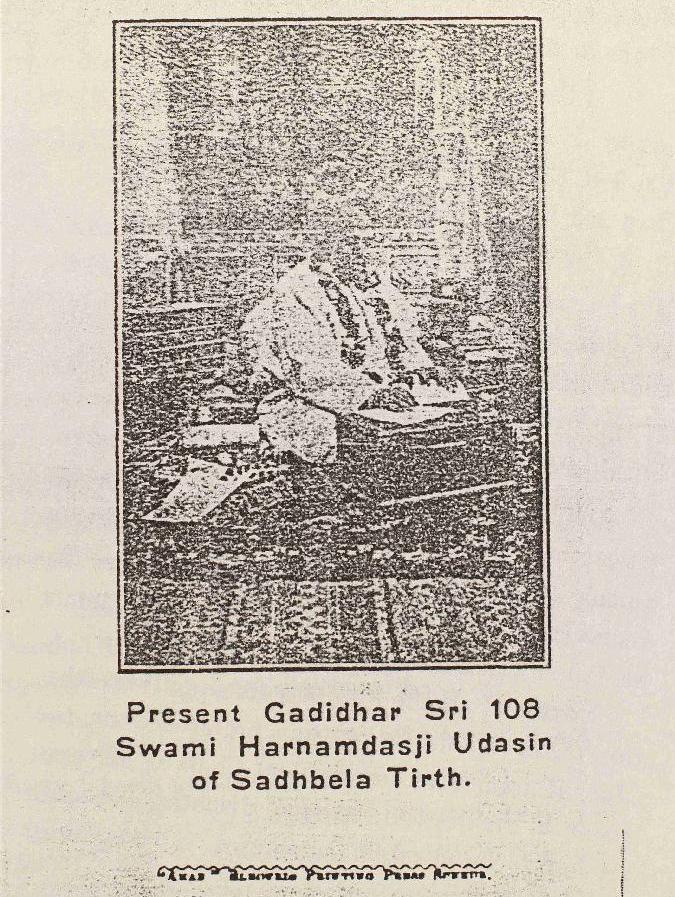
Photograph of Harnam Das Udasi, eighth gaddi nashin of Sadh Belo, ca.1927

Bawa Harnam Das, also rendered as Harnamdas, was an Udasi religious figure and scholar. He served as the eighth gaddi nashin of Sadh Belo in Sukkur, Sindh. In 1899, he ordered the construction of the temple-complex at Sadh Belo. In 1930, he requested Jinnah to visit Sadh Belo, where Jinnah made an offering of 100 rupees and asked Harnam Das explain why communal tension was present in Sindh, who blamed it on Sindhi Sheikhs. After the partition of Punjab, he became active in Kapurthala.

As for his scholarly works, he conducted research onto both the Dasam Granth and Sarbloh Granth. Harnam Das held the view that the Sarbloh Granth was authored by Guru Gobind Singh and court-poets. Harnam Das prepared and published an annotated edition of the Sarbloh Granth under the title Sri Sarab Loh Granth Sahib Ji, however its circulation has been restricted. He also researched pre-canonical Sikh texts, such as the Goindwal Pothis in the 1960s. In 1927, he published a work covering the history of the Udasi sect.

== Bibliography ==
- Das, Harnam (1927). Origin and Growth of Udasis (PDF). Translated by Dharamdas, Karamchand (1st ed.). Sukkur, Sindh: Amar Electronic Printing Press.
- Das, Harnam (1969–1972). Adi Shri Guru Granth Sahib dian Puratani Biran te Vichar (in two volumes) ਆਦਿ ਸ੍ਰੀ ਗੁਰੂ ਗ੍ਰੰਥ ਸਾਹਿਬ ਦੀਆਂ ਪੁਰਾਤਨੀ ਬੀੜਾਂ ਤੇ ਵਿਚਾਰ [Reflections on the Ancient Recensions of the Adi Sri Guru Granth Sahib] (in Punjabi). Kapurthala: Kantesh Pharmacy.
