= Bankhandi =

Udasi saint and founder of Sadh Belo

Baba Bankhandi Maharaj
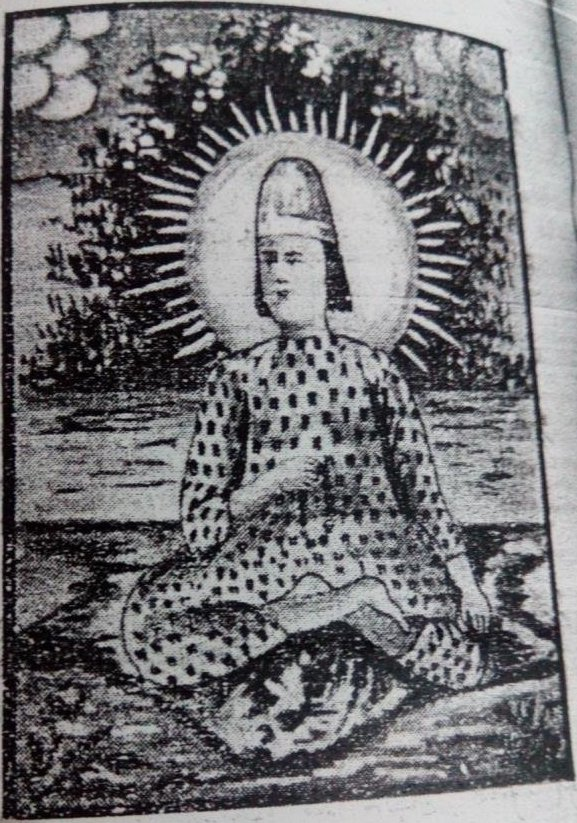
- Depiction of Bankhandi from Sakhar Soonharo (1940) by Parsram Veerumal Masand

Gaddi Nashin of Sadh Belo
- In office 1823–1863
- Preceded by: none (position established)
- Succeeded by: Swami Achal Prasad

Personal life
- Born: Balchand Sharma; 1763 Panchthar District ,Nepal or Kero Khetar near Delhi
- Died: 1863 (aged 99–100) Sadh Belo, Sukkur, Sindh

Religious life
- Religion: Syncretism of Hinduism • Sikhism
- Sect: Udasi; Bakhshishāṅ (Mihanshahi branch)

Bankhandi (1763–1863), commonly referred to as Baba Bankhandi Maharaj honorifically, also spelt Vankhandi, was an Udasi missionary and saint who founded Sadh Belo in 1823. Bankhandi was a missionary and preacher of the Mihanshahi sub-sect of the Udasis.

== Biography ==
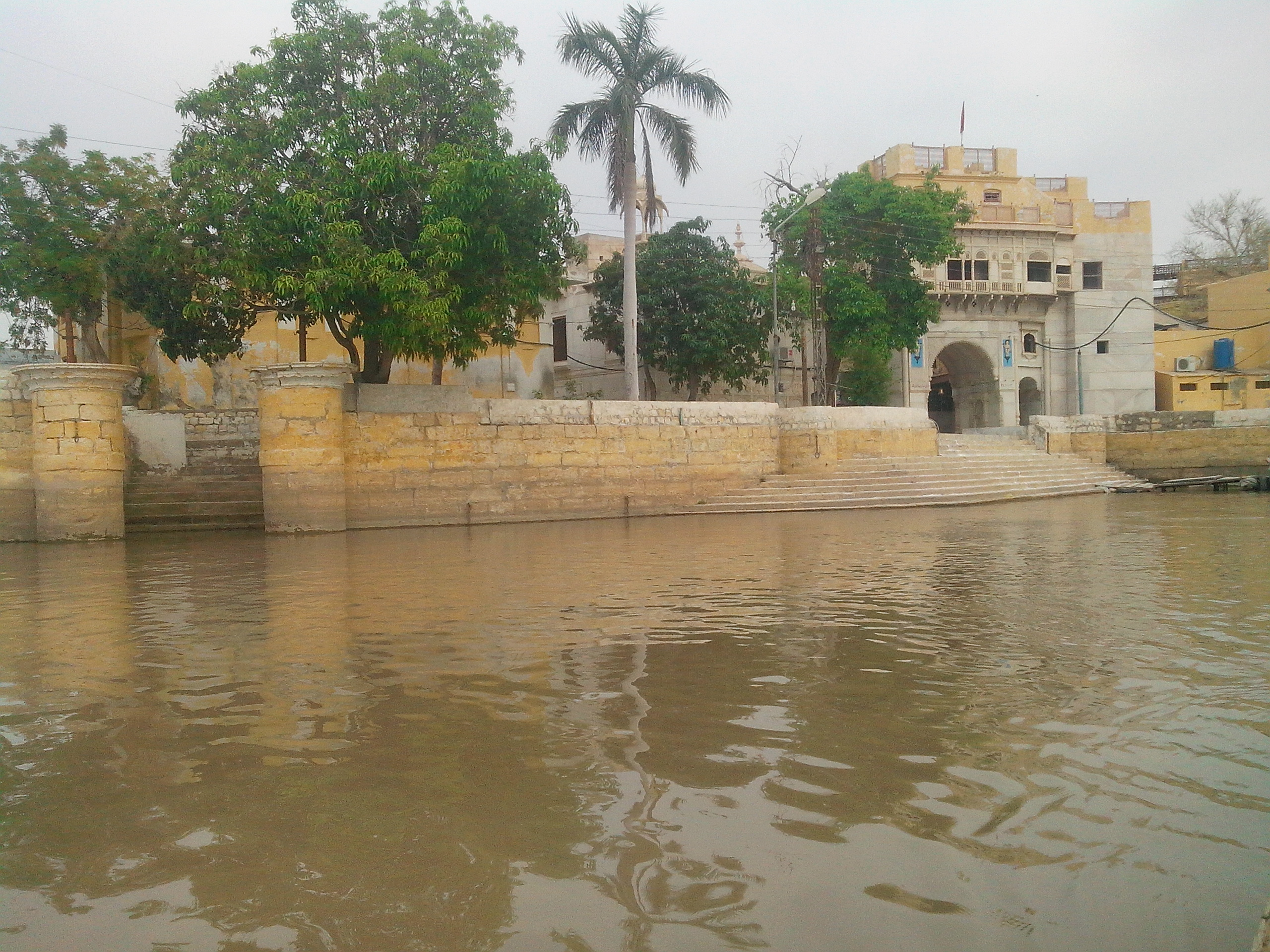
Photograph of the temple at Sadh Belo, Sukkur, Sindh

Bankhandi, who was born as Balchandra, was originally a Gaur Brahmin said to hail from Kurukshetra (in Haryana). Other sources claim he was born as Balchand Sharma, and was originally said to hail from either Panchthar District of Nepal or Kero Khetar near Dehli. According to Sarmukh Singh Amole, he was born in 1763 whilst other sources give a year of birth ranging from 1807–1808.,

He became an Udasi missionary and belonged to the Bakhshishāṅ subsect (specifically the Mihanshahi branch). He moved to a heavily forested island in Sukkur, Sindh on the Indus River called Menak Parbat in 1823 at the age of 15. He took a liking to his newfound environment, where he established a dhuni (location for a sacred fire). There he founded Sadh Belo, which grew to become a major centre of spirituality and learning for the Udasi sect. He established a hut (kutiya) there on the mound. Bankhandi established places of worship for various Indic deities, such as Annuparna, Ganesha, Shiva, and Hanuman. He also constructed places where the Guru Granth Sahib was kept. It is believed that Bankhandi had been bestowed with a bowl (kamandalu) by the goddess Annapoorna that had divine properties. He is said to have died in 1863. A temple dedicated to him was constructed in 1899 by the eight successor (gaddi nashin), Sant Harnam Das. It remains a popular pilgrimage site today.

== Sadh Belo ==
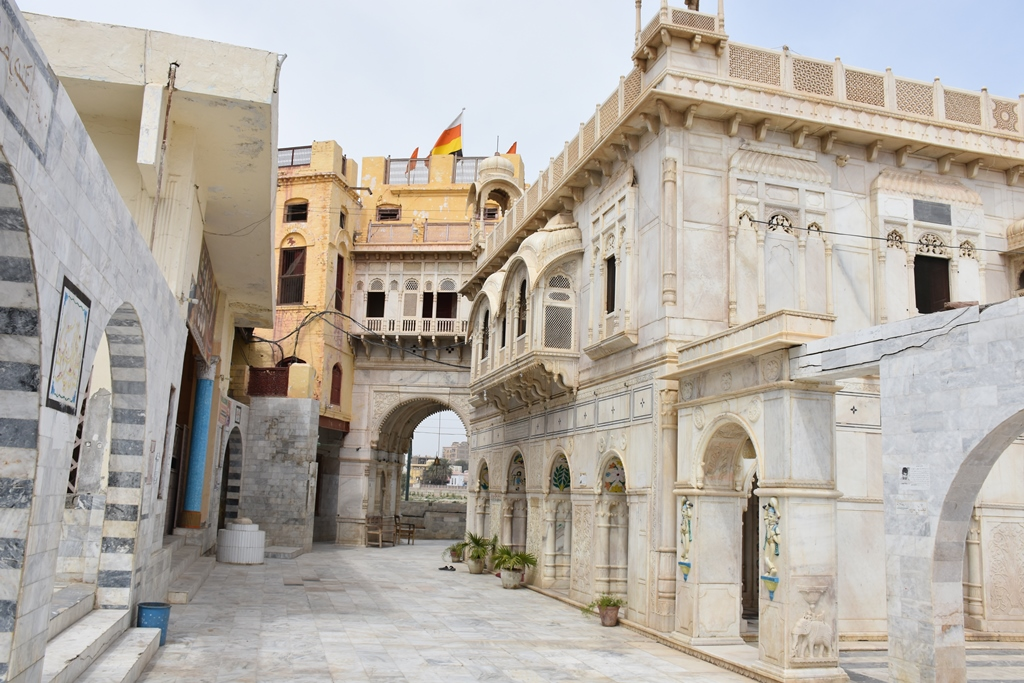
Sadh bela

During his Udasin Journey Baba Bankhandi Maharaj settled at Menak Parbat island a island in the Indus River near Sukkur, Sindh, Pakistan later this place became known as the Sadhu Bhelo, meaning the woods of the sage. According to some sources, the Sadh Belo is named after an Arab commander named "Saeed" (Arabic: سعید), who occupied and was stationed on the island.

== Nepal ==
During one of his Udāsī journeys, while returning from the Bengal region of eastern India, Baba Bankhandi travelled to the Morang area of present-day Nepal and settled in a forested area near Biratnagar, close to the Nepal–India border. According to local tradition, he was accompanied by two other ascetics, Auliya and Bagambar, and the three settled in the area. Bankhandi established a small shrine, which later became known as Banaskhandi Mahadev.

The three ascetics later left the area and travelled in different directions. Bankhandi travelled westward towards the Koshi River and settled near Chatara Dham, where he became associated with the Ramdhuni Temple. A shrine dedicated to him is located among the religious structures of the temple complex, which is also associated with the Udasi community. Auliya travelled to Chatara, while Bagambar went to Pindeswar.

== Gallery ==
Inscription about Baba Bankhandi Maharaj doing penance in "Moring Jhari", which is a historical misspelling and linguistic adaptation of the Morang region (specifically a forested area or jhari) in present-day Nepal.

Bankhandi Baba- Udasin Ramdhuni Mahant Parampara date in Bikram Samvat

== See Also ==
- Sadh Belo
- Banaskhandi Mahadev Temple
- Ramdhuni Temple
