= 2021 Singhu border lynching =

Lynching at Delhi border

Singhu Border Beadbi 2021
- 2021 Singhu border lynching (Delhi)
- Location: 28.85°N 77.12°E; Singhu, Delhi, India
- Date: 15 October 2021
- Attack type: Vigilantism
- Deaths: 1
- Perpetrator: 4 arrested (Nihang group members)
- Motive: Desecration of Sri Sarbloh Granth Sahib

The Singhu Border Beadbi 2021 refers to the incident that occurred in the early hours of 15 October 2021 at Delhi's Singhu border, resulting in the death of Lakhbir Singh, from Tarn Taran district of Punjab, India. Lakhbir Singh had arrived at the camp of the Nihang Singhs at the Kisan Morcha and proceed to throw a copy of Sri Sarbloh Granth on the floor amongst other acts of desecration. Lakhbir Singh admitted to receiving a phone call instructing him to carry out the actions in return for a monetary reward. The killing began with the victim's hand and a leg being chopped off, and later his body was hanged on a barricade near the farmers’ protest site. A Nihang Sikh group took responsibility for the killing after the man committed sacrilege of their holy scripture. A Nihang accepted his role in the murder, and courted arrest the same day. The second accused, who also belongs to the Nihang group, was arrested by the Amritsar police.

After being taken into the police custody, the second accused claimed that he had voluntarily surrendered to the police. Meanwhile, the Samyukta Kisan Morcha (SKM) distanced itself from the desecration and subsequent killing of the man, and agreed to cooperate with the police in the investigation. The Bhim Army extended financial support for the family of the victim and demanded an impartial probe from the CBI. In addition, 15 Dalit organizations also called for strict action against the culprits in the killing of Lakhbir Singh at the Singhu border after portraying the situation as the targeting of a Dalit.

Meanwhile, the victim's family has complained to the National Commission for Scheduled Castes about the lack of support from the Punjab state government.

== Background ==
During the early hours of 15 October 2021, a Dalit Sikh labourer, Lakhbir Singh from Cheema Khurd village of Tarn Taran district was lynched by Nihang Sikhs present at farmers' protest site on the allegations of sacrilege by his picking up the copy of a Sarbloh Granth. Family members of Lakhbir denied his role in alleged sacrilege.

Village residents told The Caravan that they had first seen main accused Nihang Sarabjit Singh in the village about three months earlier, near the Sarai Amanat Khan police station. Several other villagers had seen Sarabjit in Cheema Kalan on several occasions driving a Bolero Camper car close to a langar hall being built near the village's bus stand. On 12 October Lakhbir was seen leaving the market when one man on a bike picked up Lakhbir from the nearby cremation ground crossing and handed him over to two Nihangs.

== See also ==
- 2021 Lynchings for sacrilege in Punjab
- Lynching of Jagmael Singh
