= Mittar Pyare nu =

Sikh hymn from the Dasam Granth

Mittar Pyare Nu is a Shabad (religious hymn) attributed to Guru Gobind Singh in Machhiwara after the Battle of Chamkaur.

== Translation ==
It is one of the 10 shabads comprising the Shabad Hazare. Translated from the original Punjabi, it reads:

Tell the beloved friend about the state of his devotees.

Without you, we feel sick wrapping ourselves in our quilts, it's like living in a snakepit.

The flask is a thorn in the side, the cup a dagger, it's like enduring the butcher's blows.

Better to sleep on the ground near the beloved; staying in the village is like being in a furnace.

— attributed to Guru Gobind Singh, Shabad Hazare

== Machhiwara Jungle ==
The Machhiwara jungle that existed during Guru Gobind Singh's time, which was cut-down in the subsequent centuries, is planned to be revived by the SGPC through the planting of samplings on gurdwara land the organization owns within the locality to revive the lost forest.
