= Sarbloh Granth =

Tertiary scripture of Sikhism

Sarbloh Granth ਸਰਬਲੋਹ ਗ੍ਰੰਥ
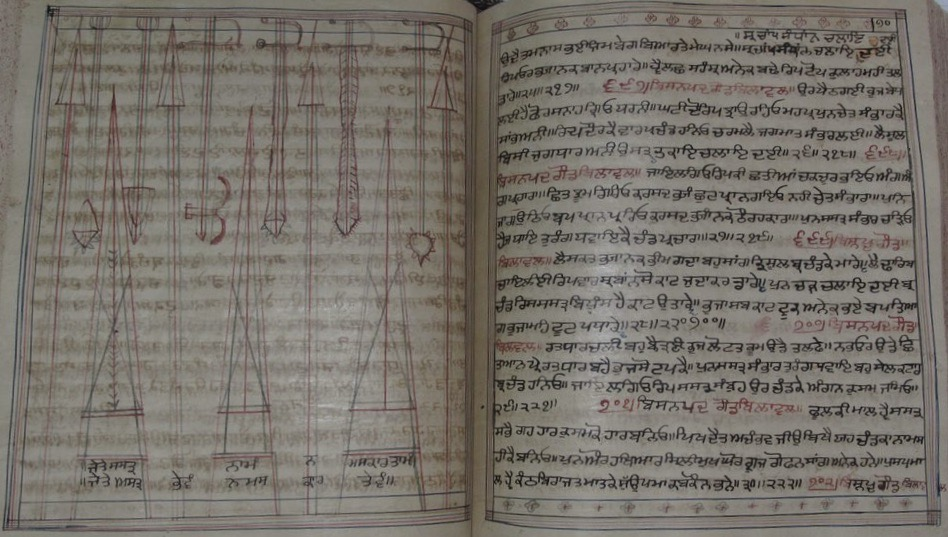
- Weapons drawn and inscribed with martial hymns eulogizing them on an illustrated folio of a Sarbloh Granth manuscript

Information
- Religion: Sikhism
- Author: Guru Gobind Singh (disputed)
- Language: Sant Bhasha (mainly influenced by Braj)
- Chapters: 5

The Sarbloh Granth or Sarabloh Granth (Punjabi: ਸਰਬਲੋਹ ਗ੍ਰੰਥ, sarabalōha grantha, literally 'Scripture of Pure Iron' (Note: The name 'Sarbloh Granth' can also be translated as meaning "book of all-iron", "all-sword book", or "scripture of wrought iron".)), also called Manglacharan Puran or Sri Manglacharan Ji, is a voluminous scripture, composed of more than 6,500 poetic stanzas. It is traditionally attributed as being the work of Guru Gobind Singh, the tenth Sikh guru. Some scholars, on the other hand, attribute the work to after the Guru's death, being authored by an unknown poet. The work is mostly revered by the Nihang sect.

According to Jvala Singh, the work is an expansion upon themes covered within the Dasam Granth, principally the Akal Ustat and Charitropahkyan (specifically the last charitar on Mahakāl) section. Within the work, a fantastical character composed of all-metal exists with various aspects of its body consisting of weaponry, such as its eyelashes being muskets or its eyes being cannons.

== History ==
=== Traditional narrative ===
As per the traditions of the Nihang Sikhs, the Sarbloh Granth was written at the Sarbloh Bunga (now called the Langar Sahib) at Takht Sri Hazur Sahib, Abachal Nagar in Nanded, India. They believe the work derives from Sanskrit sutras that were preserved by a group of sadhus, with these sutras ultimately originating from a previous incarnation of Guru Gobind Singh known as rishi Dusht Daman. It is further believed that Banda Singh Bahadur heard the last verses of the work. It is claimed that the Sanskrit sutras the Sarbloh Granth is based on is still kept in a private familial collection.

=== Authorship ===
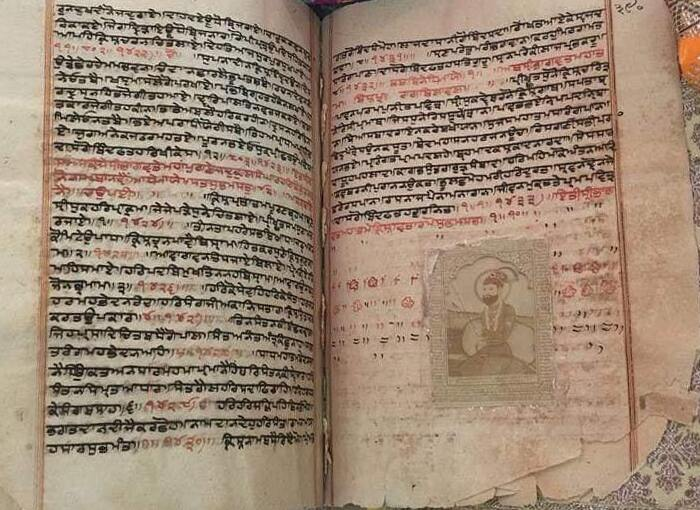
Sarabloh Granth manuscript that contains a depiction of Guru Gobind Singh, whom is traditionally ascribed as the author of the work

Very little can be ascertained regarding the authorship, compilation, or nature of the contents within the scripture. There is a high degree of controversy among various scholars on the issue of the authorship of the Granth. The following are some of the view points of prominent figures:

- According to Pundit Tara Singh, Sarabloh Granth was composed by Bhai Sukha Singh, a Granthi of Patna.
- According to Bhai Kahn Singh Nabha, Sarabloh Granth was not written by Guru Gobind Singh and Khalsa Mahima appeared in it is out of context to the main storyline.
- According to Santa Singh Nihang, Sarabloh Granth was written by Guru Gobind Singh and was completed in Nanded.
- A meeting of Sikh scholars and saints determined that Sarbloh Granth is the writings of Guru Gobind Singh and that the Sarbloh Granth was finalised at Nanded.

One narrative claims that the scripture is the result of the writings of the tenth Guru being combined, after his passing in 1708, by his followers. According to Harnam Das Udasi, a Sikh scholar who prepared an annotated edition of the scripture, the text was authored by Guru Gobind Singh. However, Harnam Das Udasi claims that Guru Gobind Singh accepted the work of some poets to form parts of the scripture, just like how Guru Arjan accepted the works written by Bhagats, Bhatts, and Sufi fakirs when he compiled the Adi Granth. However, other analysts date the text to the late 18th-century.

Gurinder Singh Mann argues that the Sarbloh Granth was produced within the courtly setting of Anandpur in the late 17th-century (specifically the 1690's) by various courtly poets (most of whose names are not known).

"In my view, the Dasam Granth and Sri Sarab Loh Granth are markers of the aura of royalty that the Sikhs attempted to create at Anandpur. The poets gathered there drew upon a shared reservoir of themes, literary forms, metaphors and images to create their songs. With the emergence of Sikh power, some poets who were resident in the broader region moved to Anandpur. A cursory look at their compositions shows the structural changes that had to be made to adjust these works to the needs of the new situation. The statements at the closing of the two longest compositions, the Krishan Avatar and Ram Avatar, carry thundering assertions of the futility of, worshipping Krishan and Ram. I can only explain them as addenda having been required to make these texts presentable at Anandpur."

— Gurinder Singh Mann, Sources for the Study of Guru Gobind Singh's Life and Times, page 256

The scripture is largely revered by the Nihang sect of Sikhs with many non-Nihang Sikhs rejecting it as an authentic work of the tenth guru, especially amongst Sikh academics. According to Gurmukh Singh, the authenticity of the work is rejected on the grounds of its writing style and mastery of poetry not matching up with Guru Gobind Singh's Dasam Granth work. Also, the text makes mention of a work composed in 1719, much after the death of the Guru. W. H. McLeod dates the work to the late 18th century and believes it was authored by an unknown poet and was mistakenly attributed to the tenth Guru. Jvala Singh believes the work to have been authored by Guru Gobind Singh but accepts that alternative views exist that it was written by 18th century Sikhs.

=== Manuscripts ===
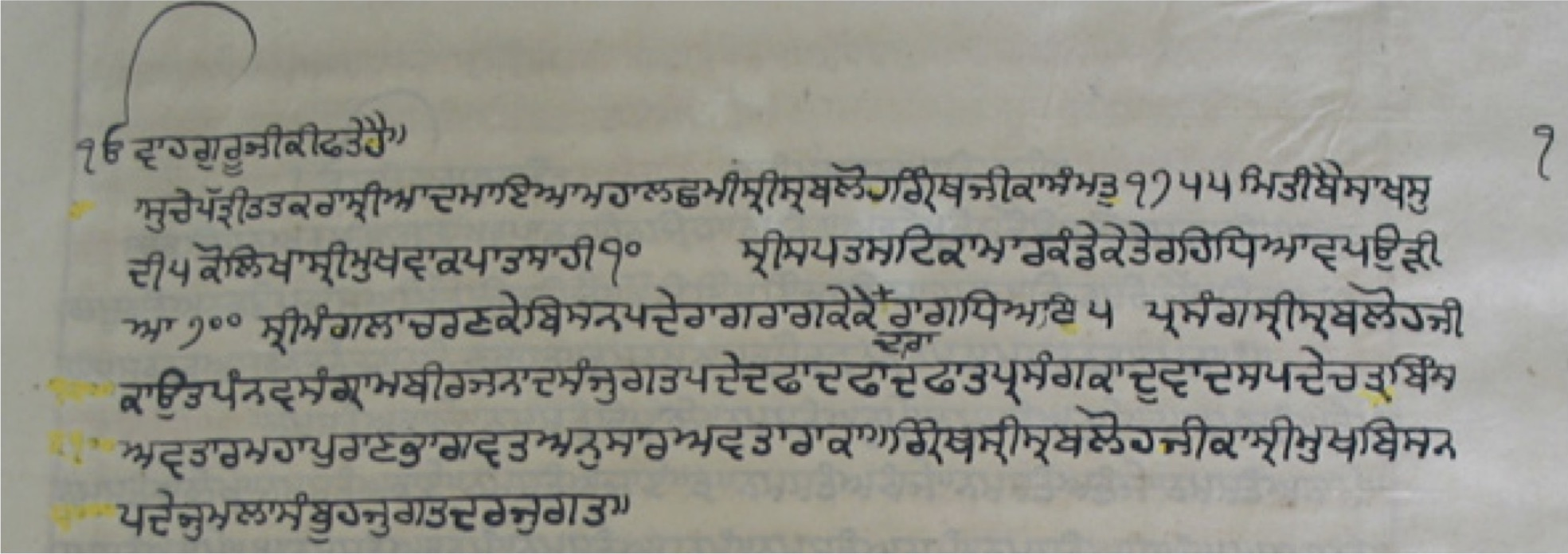
Folio of a Sarbloh Granth manuscript that bears the year 1698 as its date of writing.

Gurinder Singh Mann claims to have come across a manuscript of the scripture that dates to the late 17th-century, specifically the year 1698. (Note: The manuscript bears a recorded Indic date of Samat 1755, miti Bisakh sudi 5 (corresponding to the year 1698 in the Gregorian calendar) as their date of writing, on folios 1 and 2b.) Additionally, Harnam Das Udasi claims to have encountered a manuscript of the scripture that bears the same date for its year of compilation (1698), while he was examining twenty-four extant manuscripts of the text as part of his research activities to produce an annotated edition of the scripture. In these two early manuscripts of the scripture, the first contains the Bachittar Natak Granth on folios 1 to 350 and then continues with the text of the Sarbloh Granth-proper for the remainder of the folios (folios 351 to 702). For the second early manuscript, it only contains the text of the Sarbloh Granth-proper and there is no inclusion of external texts, unlike the other manuscript. However, the second manuscript's pagination begins with folio 351 and ends with folio 747. All together, three early manuscripts of the scripture bear their year 1698. However, it can be argued that these manuscripts were a later copy of an original from 1698 and this date was copied as well from the original in all three later copies by their respective scribes. Many early manuscripts of the scripture contain an inscription by Gurdas Singh which goes as: "Sambat satra sai bhae barakh satvanja jan. Gurdas Singh puran kio sri mukh granth parmanh." An inscription sourced from this scripture can be found in the seal of Banda Singh Bahadur and on coins minted during the reign of later Sikh polities.

According to Kamalroop Singh, there are a number of early manuscripts of the Sarbloh Granth dating to the late 17th and 18th centuries. Kamaroop Singh believes the manuscriptural evidence points to the year 1698 in Anandpur Sahib as when the majority of the work of the Sarbloh Granth was commenced, being finalized in 1708 at Hazur Sahib.

==== List of earliest manuscripts ====
Kamalroop Singh lists manuscripts of the Sarbloh Granth with a 1698 CE (1755 VS) colophon as follows:

- Nabho Katho vālī bīṛ at Hazur Sahib, which bears a colophon of 1698. This manuscript was studied by Harnam Singh Udasi.
- A manuscript kept at the Chhauṇī (cantonment) of Mata Sahib Kaur
- A manuscript is preserved by the Udasi Sampradāvāṅ at Bhankandi
- A manuscript held at Muktsar Sahib

=== Present ===
The 2021 Singhu border incident involved the desecration of a manuscript of the Sarbloh Granth, which angered a group of Nihangs who killed the perpetrator of the sacrilege.

== Description ==
=== Role ===
The Sarabloh Granth is a separate religious text from the Guru Granth Sahib and Dasam Granth, and no hymn or composition of this granth is used in daily Sikh liturgy or Amrit Sanchar. Nihang Sikhs hold the scripture in reverence, as they attribute its authorship to Guru Gobind Singh. Nihang Sikhs place the Sarbloh Granth on the left-side of the Guru Granth Sahib (with the Dasam Granth being placed on the right-side) in their public worship arrangement.

=== Structure and contents ===
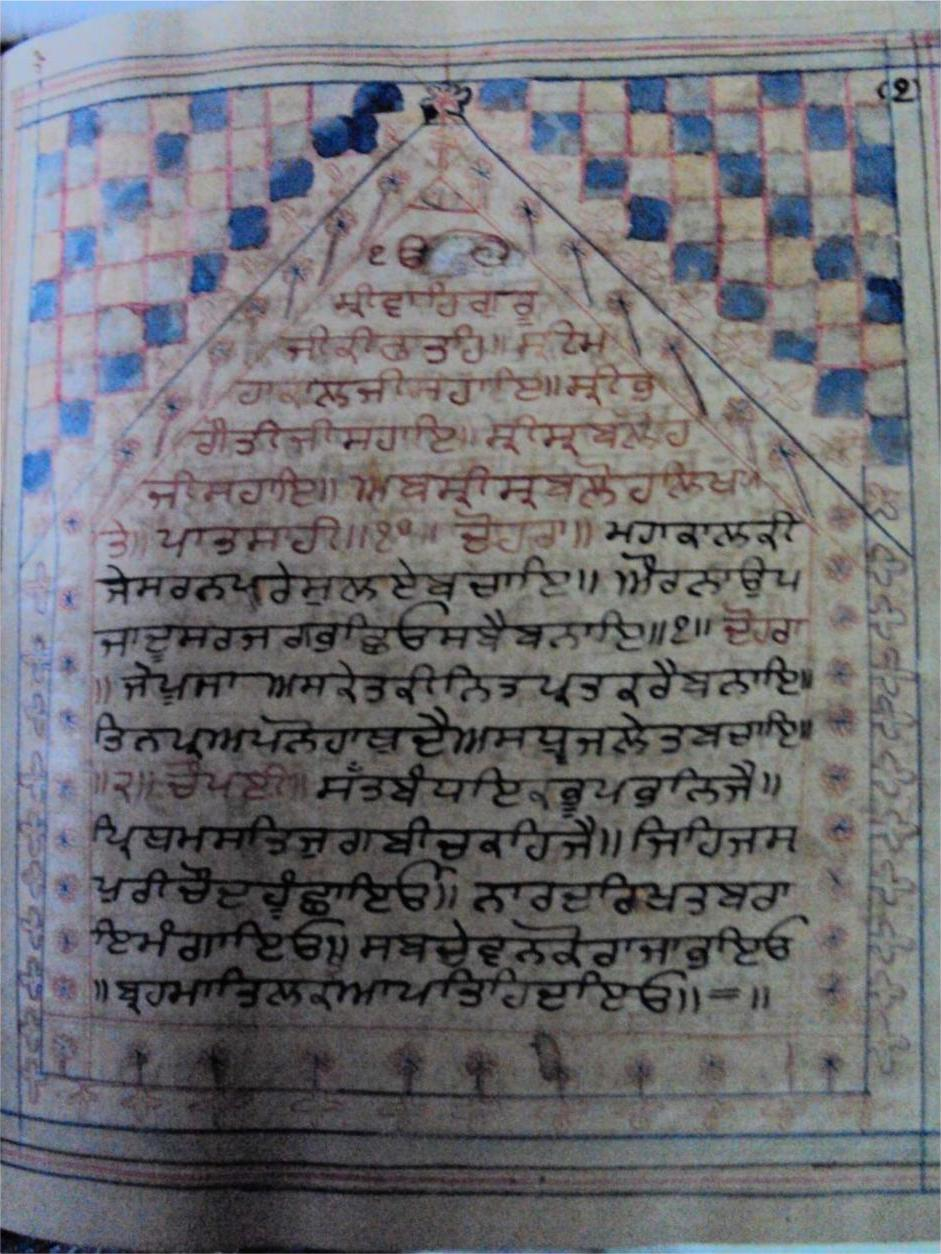
Illuminated folio of the Shahidi Bagh manuscript of the Sarbloh Granth, kept in the collection of Gurdwara Shahidi Bagh, Anandpur Sahib

Sarbloh Granth is separated into 5 chapters known as adhiyas. There are 4,361 padd (stanzas) in-total across the five chapters. The scripture itself is 1665 pages in-length total and comprises three volumes. A printed version released by Santa Singh is 862 pages in-length. At the end of the five chapters is an appendment containing information on Vishnu's incarnations.

The first four chapters are similar in narrative, focusing on Indic mythological wars between the devi-devta coalition against demons, focusing on the message of Bir-Rās (warrior spirit) to engrain the Sant-Sipahi teaching of Sikhism. The Indic deities are chronologically described as being manifestations of the hukam (command) of the Divine, and are not eternal beings although they were bestowed with powers, despite perhaps believing themselves to be supreme, with a focus on their futility. Many Shaktist terminology is employed in these chapters, such as Chandi, Bhavani, Bhagauti, whose meanings differ by interpretation, with some viewing these as references to the literal namesake deity whilst others view them as references to metaphysical concepts. According to Abinash Mahapatra, the term Bhavani refers to "the germinating power of this universe" whilst Bhagauti refers to a dual leitmotif consisting of weaponry and true supplication to the Divine. Meanwhile, Chandi refers to Kaal (temporality) rather than Akaal (eternality), it can also be interpreted as referring to female-empowerment, and the creative, preservative, and destructive powers, thus responsible for the tricks of rituals (tantra), supernaturality (siddhi), and hypocrisy (pakhand).

The first chapter contains praise and invocations to various devis (goddesses). The second chapter covers Vishnu as an incarnation of the supreme God. Chapter five, which is also the longest chapter, concludes that the various gods and goddesses mentioned formerly are incarnations of Sarabloh (literally meaning "all-iron"), which itself is an incarnation of Mahakal, a term used by Guru Gobind Singh to refer to the all-mighty divine being.

==== Chapter One ====
The first chapter, or Pahila Adhiya (Gurmukhi: ਪਹਿਲਾ ਅਧਯਾਯ, romanized: Pahilā adhayāya, lit. 'First chapter'), contains praises toward Maha Maya and Maha Kala. The Indic demi-gods (devte) lose a battle to demons, and request the devi, Chandi, to assist them. Chandi then defeats the demoniacal army and their leader, Bhimnad.

==== Chapter Two ====
In the second chapter, or Duja Adhiya (Gurmukhi: ਦੂਜਾ ਅਧਯਾਯ, romanized: Dūjā adhayāya, lit. 'Second chapter'), the wife of the defeated Bhimnad commits sati. Bhimnad's brother, Brijnad, prepares for revenge by starting another war against the demi-gods. The deity Indra writes letters to all the demi-gods asking for their help in the upcoming war.

==== Chapter Three ====
In the third chapter, or Tija Adhiya (Gurmukhi: ਤੀਜਾ ਅਧਯਾਯ, romanized: Tījā adhayāya, lit. 'Third chapter'), the demons are winning against the demi-gods, thus Vishnu sends Narada to serve as their representative to Brijnad. However, Brijnad would not negotiate and hostilities resumed. In the beginning of the unsuing battle, eleven armies of Brijnad that were on-foot were destroyed.

==== Chapter Four ====
In the fourth chapter, or Cautha Adhiya (Gurmukhi: ਚੌਥਾ ਅਧਯਾਯ, romanized: Cauthā adhayāya, lit. 'Fourth chapter'), a great battle is being waged. Vishnu gives amrit (ambrosial nectar) to the demi-gods, reinvigorating them. Indra captures the demons, yet Brijnad gains the upper-hand and attains victory in the battle, with Indra being captured by the demonic force.

==== Chapter Five ====
In the fifth chapter, or Panjva Adhiya (Gurmukhi: ਪੰਜਵਾ ਅਧਯਾਯ, romanized: Pajavā adhayāya, lit. 'Fifth chapter'), the aftermath of the demi-gods losing to the demons results in the demi-gods appealing to Akal Purakh for divine help. Thus, Akal Purakh incarnates as Sarbloh Avtar ("all-iron incarnation"). The demi-god Ganesha is appointed as Sarbloh Avtar's ambassador to Brijnad. However, Brijnad does not listen to Ganesha and wages another war. The demi-gods team-up with Sarbloh Avtar against the Indic demons. The demons and Brijnad are then "immersed in bliss" after attainting darshan (auspicious sight) of Sarbloh Avtar, with Brijnad praising Sarbloh Avtar. Sarbloh Avtar then takes on a terrifying form and annihilates all of the demons, including Brijnad in a final battle.

In the chapter, the Sarbloh Avtar is revealed at Jagannath Puri in Odisha. The traditional Trimurti (Brahma, Vishnu, and Shiva) are described as bowing to Sarbloh Avtar, as does the entire Universe. The avtar destroys all the evil forces acting upon the divine hukam of Waheguru, with its hairs and organs being described as martial weapons and equipment. In the concluding sections, verses discussing the importance of the Waheguru Mantar, the Khalsa, the Gur-Gaddi, can be found, with a section praising Guru Nanak.

==== Appendment on Vishnu's Avatars ====
After the conclusion of the fifth chapter, there is another section narrating incarnations of Vishnu. A list of the avatars of Vishnu discussed in this part includes the following:

- Mach Avtar – fish incarnation
- Kach Avtar – tortoise incarnation
- Barhā Avtar – wild-boar incarnation
- Nar Singh Avtar – half-man and half-lion incarnation
- Purshraam Avtar – Parashurama
- Ram Avtar, called 'Bīj Ramaein' – Rama
- Krishan Avtar, called "Dasam Sakand" (tenth chapter of Bhagvad Purana) – Krishna

=== Themes ===
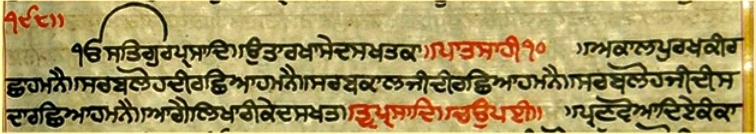
Detail of a page of a manuscript of the Sarbloh Granth showing verses of the Akal Ustat composition

The scripture deals largely on the art of warfare from a Sikh perspective. Within the scripture is contained the Das grāhī-Das tiāgī (ten virtues to hold – ten vices to renounce) for the Khalsa, as narrated by Guru Gobind Singh. All the names employed by Guru Gobind Singh in the Jaap Sahib to describe the divine find mention in the Sarbloh Granth. The scripture promotes the idea that the Waheguru mantar (mantra) is the only one capable of shedding haumai (ego) if chanted.

==== Indic mythological wars ====
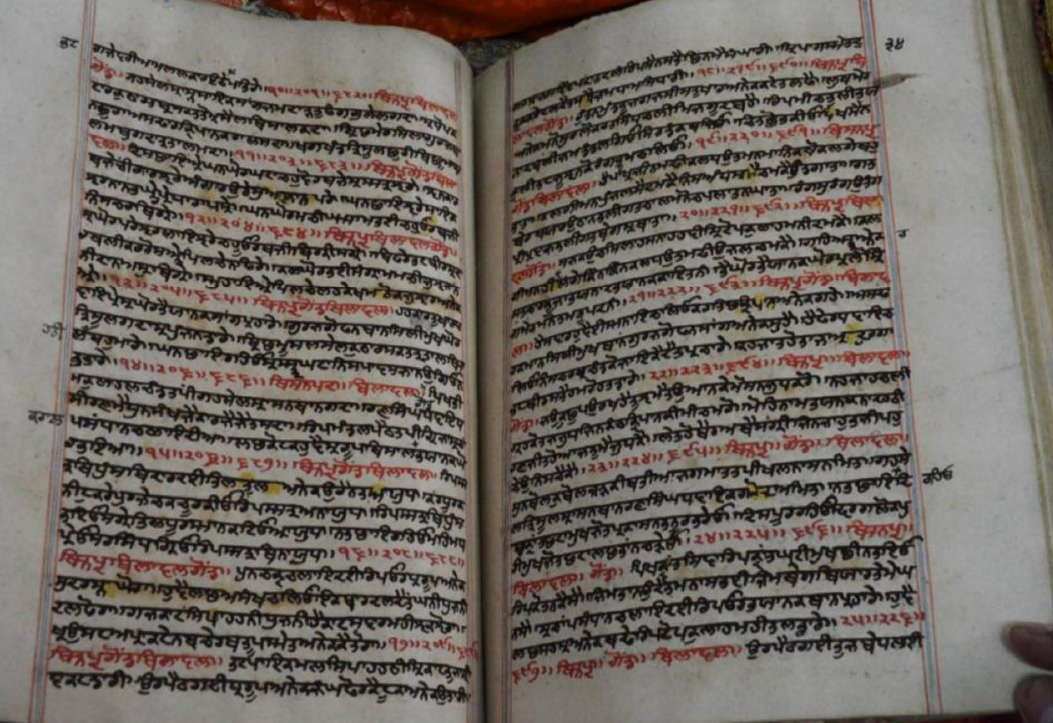
Manuscript of the Sarbloh Granth, attributed to Bhai Daya Singh

The work contains stories related to Indian mythology, specifically the battles between gods and goddesses against demonic forces of evil. The plot of the book is very similar to the Chandi Charitar stories found within the Dasam Granth. Some Indic deities mentioned in the composition are Lakshmi, Bhavani, Durga, Jvala, Kali (Kalika), Chandi, Hari, Gopal, Vishnu, Shiva, Brahma, and Indra. Indic demons, such as Bhiminad and Viryanad, are also involved in the text's story-line. The text also narrates the story of an incarnation of the divine known as 'Sarab Loh' ("all-steel") who defeats the king of the demons, Brijnad. According to Gurinder Singh Mann, the scripture's main theme is the annihilation of demons and evil by an incarnation of the divine known as 'Mahakal' or 'Shiva', he links this theme to a similar one that is presented in the Bachittar Natak Granth, which is part of the Dasam Granth collection of texts.

==== Khalsa Panth ====
The scripture discusses the Sikh concept of the Khalsa in-depth and in-detail. The text iterates that the Khalsa Panth is the form of Guru Gobind Singh himself and there is no difference between the Khalsa and the Guru. The text states that the Khalsa was not created by the Guru out of any rage but rather it was created as the image of the Guru, for balancing reasons, and for the pleasure of the divine. Furthermore, the concept of "Khalsa Raj" ('Khalsa-rule') is presented in the text. Furthermore, the text presents a concise history of the ten human gurus of Sikhism. The Sarbloh Granth narrates that the guruship was passed by Guru Gobind Singh not only on the Guru Granth Sahib, but also the Guru Khalsa Panth. It also goes over the purpose, duties, and responsibilities of the Khalsa Panth, describing the Khalsa as an "army of God". The scripture further states the qualities that members of the Khalsa must possess, such as high moral standards, fervently spiritual, and heroic. According to Trilochan Singh, all of the 5Ks are mentioned in the text, however Jaswant Singh Neki states only three of them are mentioned.

According to Hazura Singh in his commentary on the scripture, the Khalsa is the liberated form of Nirankar (Prāpati Niraṅkarī sivrūp mahānaṅ), not of the Indic deity Shiva, as some Sanatanist revivalists interpret.

===== Khalsa Mahima within the Sarbloh Granth =====
Khalsa Mahima is present in this granth. The Khalsa Mahima is a short-hymn by Guru Gobind Singh.

"The Khalsa is exactly like me, I ever abide in the Khalsa : The Khalsa is my body and soul, The Khalsa is the life of my life"

— Guru Gobind Singh (claimed), Sarbloh Granth, page 531

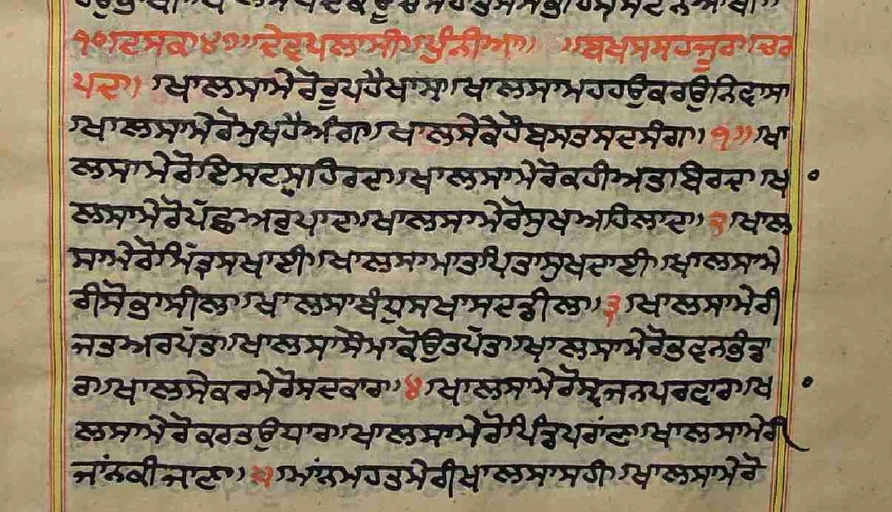
Beginning verses of the Khalsa Mehima from a 1878 CE Sarbloh Granth Manuscript

In this composition, the Guru states that only by the Khalsa keeping its distinct identity can it be successful with his blessing but this blessing would be revoked if the Khalsa loses its unique identity, psyche, and separation from the rest of humanity.

A translation of the verses is as follows:

Sarbloh Granth

Ātam ras jo jānahī so hai Khālsā dev. Prabh mai mo mai tās mai raṅchak nāhin bhev.
Khālsā mero rūp hai khās. Khālse meṅ hau karo niwās.
Khālsā Akāl Purakh kī Phauj. Pragaṭio Khālsā Paramātam ki mauj.

— Guru Gobind SIngh
Translation:
English

Khalsa is the one who experience the bliss of the Super-Soul. There is no difference between God, me (Guru Gobind Singh) and him.
The Khalsa is my special form. I reside in the Khalsa.
Khalsa is God’s own legion. The Khalsa is manifest due to the Supreme-Soul’s own wish.

— Kamalroop Singh

=== Language ===
The work is primarily in Braj with influences of other languages as well, making it challenging for readers to comprehend. Other languages found in the scripture include Sanskrit, Arabic, Urdu, Hindi, Punjabi, Pashto, Persian, and others.

=== Musicology ===
Similar to the Guru Granth Sahib, the verses found within the Sarbloh Granth are set to Indic classical music, known as gurmat sangeet, specifically raags and chhands. All-together, a total of 174 raags are employed in the Sarbloh Granth, compared to the 21 found in the Dasam Granth and the 62 found in the Guru Granth Sahib (which also contains 17 taals).

== Commentary ==
There is only one complete commentary and exegesis of this granth available, as it is still in research and remains little studied by academic circles so-far. The existing commentary was published by Santa Singh of the Budha Dal, an organization of Nihangs. Another commentary of the work by Giani Naurang Singh is also extant. An annotated edition (ṭīkā; commentary) of the Sarbloh Granth was produced by Harnam Das Udasi in the late 1980's under the title Sri Sarab Loh Granth Sahib Ji, however its circulation has been restricted. In 1925, an exegesis of the Sarbloh Granth was written by Akali Hazura Singh, then head-granthi of Takht Hazur Sahib (with its foreword written by Akali Kaur Singh). Jathedar Joginder Singh 'Muni' wrote a description of the traditional exegesis (kathā) of the Sarbloh Granth at Hazur Sahib in his work Hazūrī Maryādā Prabodh.

== Printing ==
In 1925, Akali Kaur Singh wrote that there were only around ten manuscripts of the Sarbloh Granth scattered in private collections across India. He urged that a wealthy or royal Sikh should take up the cause of printing the scripture. The mass-printing of the scripture was finally printed undertaken by Santa Singh of the Budha Dal.

Printing of the Sarbloh Granth is carried out by the Chatar Singh Jiwan Singh printing house based in Amritsar for distribution to Nihang-operated gurdwaras. The standard, printed edition contains 1216 pages.

== Translation ==
A full translation to English of the entire Sarbloh Granth had not been done for a long time until Kamalroop Singh’s translation that was released in June 2025. Translations of select verses can be found on Manglacharan.com.

The first English translation of the Sarbloh Granth by Kamalroop Singh was published and released online on 6 June 2025. Kamalroop Singh first encountered the Sarbloh Granth in circa 2005 in the form of the handwritten manuscript housed at Mai Bhago's chhauni. After coming across the scripture, he had a desire to share it with the wider Sikh community in an accessible English translation. However, he struggled early-on with textual variations of the scripture, unreliable OCR technology, and a lack of a standardized unicode for Gurmukhi. He researched various manuscripts of the work, such as the one at Khalsa College in Amritsar, two at Sangrur, Mai Bhago's manuscript held at Hazur Sahib, and various others. Kamalroop Singh utilized original manuscripts, published commentaries, Braj, Sanskrit, and Punjabi dictionaries, readers, linguistic workers, and grammar-books, to prepare the transliteration and translation. After years of work, an English translation accompanying a transliteration of the scripture was prepared.

== See also ==
- Guru Granth Sahib
- Dasam Granth
- Sikhism
- Sikh gurus
- Dharamyudh
- Khalsa Fauj
- Raj Karega Khalsa
