= 2021 lynchings in Punjab, India =

Lynchings for sacrilege in Punjab

- Location: 31°37′14″N 74°52′50″E; Amritsar, Punjab, India
- Date: 18–19 December 2021
- Attack type: Lynching
- Deaths: 2
- Perpetrator: Sikh mobs

The 2021 lynchings in Punjab, India refers to the widely reported lynching incidents that occurred on 18-19 December 2021, at two Sikh temples in Punjab, India in which enraged mobs killed 2 men in response to alleged acts of sacrilege.

== Lynching incidents ==
=== First Incident (18 December) ===
The first incident took place on 18 December 2021 at the Amritsar Golden Temple, the holiest shrine for Sikhs, when a man barged into the inner sanctum, where Sikhism's holy book, the Guru Granth Sahib, is kept. The man grabbed a ceremonial sword placed next to the holy book; but was overpowered by Sikh guards and worshippers, and then beaten to death before the police arrived at the scene.

=== Second Incident (19 December) ===
The second lynching incident took place in the early hours of 19 December 2021, when a mentally challenged man who was hungry stole a chapati from the gurudwara kitchen. Police found no evidence of sacrilege and also arrested people on murder charges. The Kapurthala police claimed as per preliminary investigations, it seemed to be a case of theft and there was no evidence of sacrilege.

== Response ==
The Punjab Police reported that the victims remained unidentified as the Police did not find any Identity Card with them, but attempts were on to identify them by reviewing the security footage of the shrines. Meanwhile, the Akal Takht Jathedar Giani Harpreet Singh condemned the "sacrilege" attempt at the Golden Temple and sought a thorough investigation. Further, some intellectuals have noted that the silence of most political leaders on the lynching of the alleged culprits at the holy shrines of the Sikhs, was disturbing.

== See also ==
- 2021 Singhu border lynching
