= 33 Savaiye =

33 Savaiye ੩੩ ਸਵਈਏ
- Dasam Granth
- ← Shabad Hazare Khalsa Mahima →
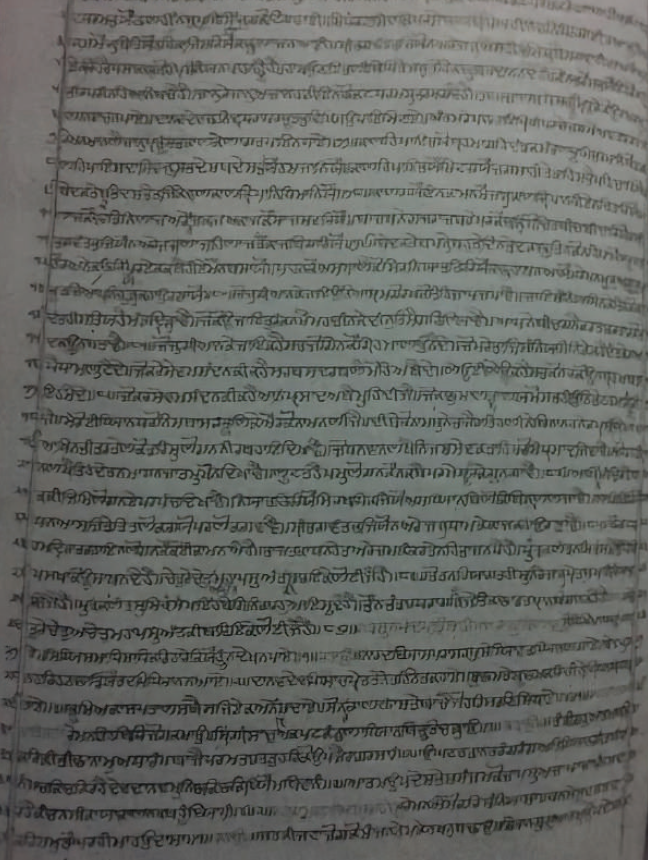
- Verses of 33 Savaiye from the Anandpur Hazuri Bir (manuscript), circa late 17th century

Information
- Religion: Sikhism
- Author: Guru Gobind Singh
- Chapters: 33

33 Savaiye (Gurmukhi: ੩੩ ਸਵਈਏ; alternatively transliterated as Swayyae; also known as Sri Mukhvak Savaiya) is a religious work written by Guru Gobind Singh which is included in Dasam Granth, second scripture of Sikhs. It is present after Sabad Patshahi 10 and continued with Khalsa Mahima. It explains qualities of Supreme and the Khalsa.

== Synopsis ==
The compositions lauds a divine conception that is unreached and unknowable by the elucidations used in the Quranic, Vedic, Biblical, and Puranic literature. It also openly challenges anyone who venerates particular avatars of the divine rather than the whole and those who present themselves to be religious people in public yet remain ignorant. The thirtieth savaiya of the work is a strong rebuking of the materialisticly greedy and corrupted masands, as per Dharam Pal Ashta in The Poetry of the Dasam Granth (1959). Some verses of the work are used occasionally for Amrit Sanchar baptismal ceremonies.

A verse in the text admonished the worshipping of mausoleums and graves, which are a component of Punjabi folk religion. The verse is as follows: Gor marhi mat bhul na manai ("worship not even by mistake [a] mausoleum or grave").

It was written at Anandpur Sahib.

=== Structure ===
- It is situated on page 712 to 716 of Dasam Granth.
- These are 33 savaiyas in number, having four stanzas each.

== See also ==
- Savaiya
