= Khalsa Mahima =

Compositions in Dasam Granth and Sarbloh Granth

Khalsa Mahima ਖਾਲਸਾ ਮਹਿਮਾ
- Dasam Granth and Sarbloh Granth
- ← 33 Savaiye (Dasam Granth) Shastar Nam Mala (Dasam Granth) →
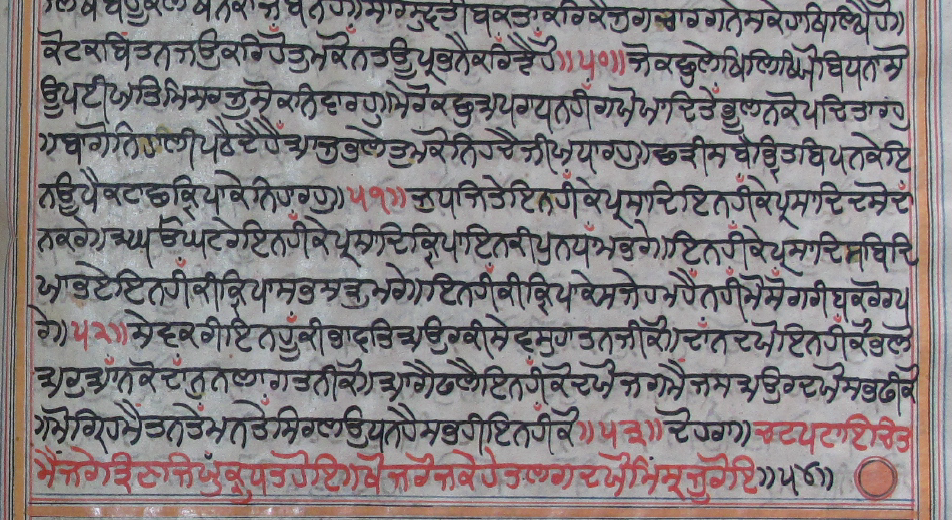
- "Khalsa Mehima" composition from the "Patna Missal" Dasam Granth manuscript from 1765 CE

Information
- Religion: Sikhism
- Author: Guru Gobind Singh
- Verses: Four stanzas

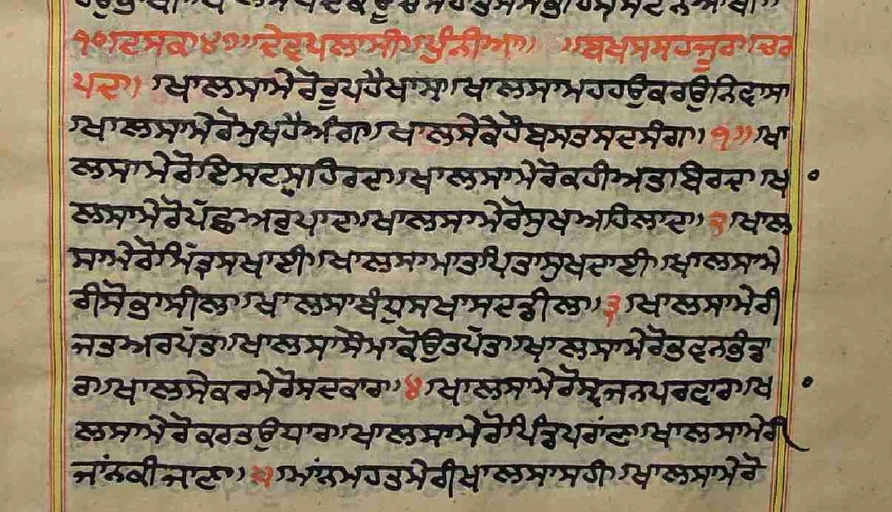
Beginning verses of the Khalsa Mehima from a 1878 CE Sarbloh Granth Manuscript

Khalsa Mahima (or Khalsa Mehma; Punjabi: ਖਾਲਸਾ ਮਹਿਮਾ lit. 'Praise of the Khalsa') is the name of two compositions that praise the Khalsa in poetic form, composed by Guru Gobind Singh, each present in Dasam Granth and Sarbloh Granth.

== Khalsa Mahima of the Dasam Granth ==
In Dasam Granth, the composition is present at end of the 33 Savaiyes and is followed in sequence by the Shastar Naam Mala. It contains four stanzas whilst others describe it as containing three stanzas and a couplet (Dohra). It is essentially an utterance the Guru gave to a Brahmin at the base of the Naina Devi temple, when the latter was angered by Sikhs receiving alms rather than Brahmins priests after a sacrificial ceremony. The Guru states the Brahmin will receive gifts but the almighty will look after the Guru and ensure his success.

This composition praises the Khalsa army. It was composed in Kapal Mochan after Battle of Bhangani, when Guru Gobind Singh provided robes of honor to his warriors and was addressed to Mishar, a Hindu Scholar. It is believed that the composition was addressed to Pandit Kesho Dutt, a Hindu scholar, on the conclusion of a Yagna at Naina Devi, although the Yagna is not treated as a Sikh ritual.

The second part of this composition is recited among Sikhs in Kirtans:

ਜੁੱਧ ਜਿਤੇ ਇਨ ਹੀ ਕੇ ਪ੍ਰਸਾਦਿ ਇਨ ਹੀ ਕੇ ਪ੍ਰਸਾਦਿ ਸੁ ਦਾਨ ਕਰੇ ॥

ਅਘ ਅਉਘ ਟਰੈ ਇਨ ਹੀ ਕੇ ਪ੍ਰਸਾਦਿ ਇਨ ਹੀ ਕ੍ਰਿਪਾ ਫੁਨ ਧਾਮ ਭਰੇ ॥

ਇਨ ਹੀ ਕੇ ਪ੍ਰਸਾਦਿ ਸੁ ਬਿੱਦਿਆ ਲਈ ਇਨ ਹੀ ਕੀ ਕ੍ਰਿਪਾ ਸਭ ਸ਼ੱਤ੍ਰੁ ਮਰੇ ॥

ਇਨ ਹੀ ਕੀ ਕ੍ਰਿਪਾ ਕੇ ਸਜੇ ਹਮ ਹੈਂ ਨਹੀ ਮੋਸੋ ਗਰੀਬ ਕਰੋਰ ਪਰੇ ॥੨॥

Guru Gobind Singh gave equal status to Khalsa when he eulogized that it was because of Khalsa that he has been what he is. He conveyed that he would donate to Khalsa rather than the Hindu Brahmin because Khalsa preached Gurmat thoughts, provided charity for the poor, gave food to hungry, and purchased arms to fight against tyranny. This hymn opposes the Varna classification and stresses that Brahmins should fight like Kshatriyas and Kshatriyas should learn and preach the wisdom of Almighty, and that both characters are played by Khalsa.

Guru Gobind Singh makes it abundantly clear in his Khalsa Mahima that he considers the Khalsa to have equal status with him.

ਉਪਮਾ ਖ਼ਾਲਸੇ ਜਾਤ ਨ ਕਹੀ ॥
Praise of the Khalsa cannot be said.

Literarily, it means that the complete praise of the Khalsa can never be said, that is, it is limitless.

Kirpa Ram, was one such Brahmin who joined the Khalsa shedding his caste and Varna and preached Gurmat, taught and fought and martyred in Battle of Chamkaur.

== Khalsa Mahima of the Sarabloh Granth ==
In Sarabloh Granth, the composition is present under the title "Bisanupad Dhanuaki Dev Plasi" on line 459, which starts with Khalsa Mero Roop Hai Khaas.

The Sarbloh Granth is revered as the Khalsa's third main scripture by many, including the Nihang Singhs, but it is otherwise unknown to the general Sikh community. The Khalsa Mahima composition from the Sarbloh Granth, ironically, is probably the more well-known of the two. Many Sikhs have probably heard the hymn "Khalsa Mero Roop Hai Khaas," a Shabad that many Ragis have performed over the years.

Though the authenticity of Sarabloh Granth is uncertain, its treatment of Khalsa is traditionally and philosophically accurate. Khalsa Akaal Purakh Ki Fauj is the phrase of Saint-Soldiery, common among Sikhs, which is commonly recited as Khalsa Kaal Purakh Ki Fauj (Page 531), is present in that composition. This hymn is also called Khalsa da Martaba. It is also considered to be a Vaisakhi Hymn.
