= Battle of Machhiwara =

Mughal-Suri battle

- Part of Humayun Campaign
Date	15 May 1555
Location	Machhiwara 30.91°N 76.2°E
Result	Mughal victory

Belligerents
Mughal Empire	Suri Empire

Commanders and leaders
Humayun; Bairam Khan; Chakar Khan	Naseeb Khan; Tartar Khan

Strength
15,000–20,000	30,000

Casualties and losses
Unknown	Unknown

The Battle of Machhiwarra was fought between Mughal Empire and Suri Empire in 1555.

== Background ==
After the death of Islam Shah Suri, the Suri Empire was in a civil war where various contenders to the throne fought each other for supremacy. Sikandar Shah Suri was occupied with his struggle against Ibrahim Shah Suri when Humayun mobilized an army from Kabul. He captured Rohtas Fort and Lahore in February 1555. Another detachment of his forces captured Dipalpur and Jalandhar. Their advance division proceeded towards Sirhind.

== Battle ==
Sikandar sent a force of 30,000 under Naseeb Khan and Tartar Khan to intercept them but they were defeated by the Mughal Army at Machhiwara opening the way to Sirhind which was occupied by the Mughals.

== Aftermath ==
Humayun continued his campaign into Sur lands, and the subsequent victory at the Battle of Sirhind allowed Humayun to reestablish the Mughal Empire.
