= Shabad Hazare =

Sikh composition from the Dasam Granth

- Dasam Granth
- ← Rudra Avtar 33 Savaiye →
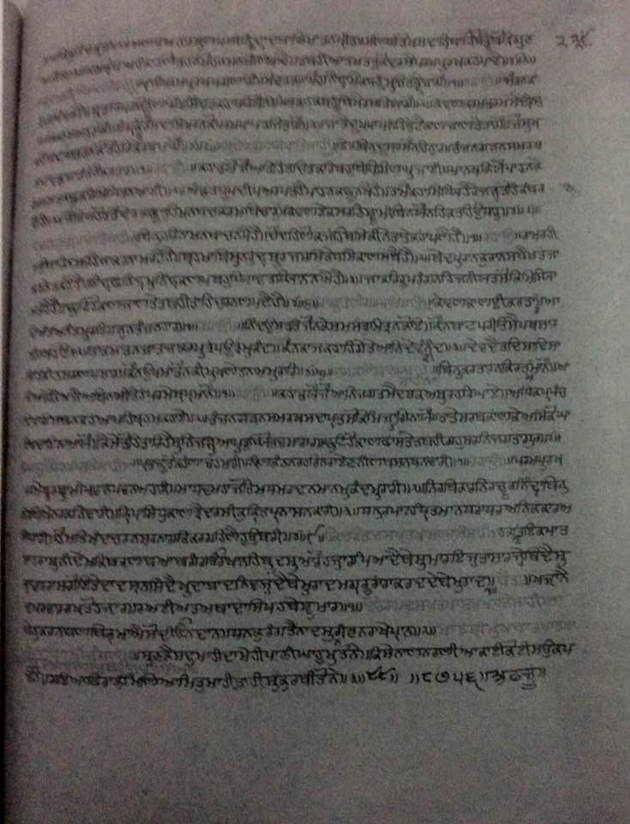
- Concluding portion of Shabad Hazare - from the Anandpuri Hazuri bir (manuscript) of the Dasam Granth dated to 1698

Information
- Religion: Sikhism
- Author: Guru Gobind Singh
- Chapters: 10

Shabad Hazare, also known as Sabad Patshahi 10 (Punjabi: ਸ਼ਬਦ ਹਜ਼ਾਰੇ ਪਾਤਿਸ਼ਾਹੀ ੧੦, pronunciation: [ʃbəd̪ ɦəd͡ʒäːɾe päːt̪ɪsäːɦiː d̪əsəʋi], also known as the Shabad Hazare Padishah), under the title Shabad (Punjabi: ਸਬਦ), are ten religious hymns (or shabads) composed by Guru Gobind Singh that are present in Dasam Granth. These hymns have comments on ritualistic practices in Sanyas, Jogis and Bairagis, and also against any form of idolatry, human or deity worship.

== Description ==
These hymns are primarily composed in Braj and Punjabi languages, written in Gurmukhi, with plentiful use of Sanskrit words, except sixth hymn, which is composed in Punjabi with some Persian words.

Excluding the sixth, all other hymns have three Padash and Rahau (The Pause) placed in the beginning of the Shabads.

Sixth hymn Mittar Pyare nu was composed at Machhiwara whereas others were composed at Anandpur Sahib. The ordering of hymns was given by Bhai Mani Singh. The shabads are similar in theme to Vaishnavist poetry regarding avatars.

The only six Ragas present in Dasam Granth are in the title of hymns.

These Shabads deal with futility of asceticism, idolatry and attachment.

Shabad Hazare is a title given to collection of these Shabads, with Hazare meaning "one thousand". Though it is not present in main text and the meaning is not too clear but traditionally it is believed that each Shabad has the merit of a thousand. Some scholar link the word "hazare" word to the Persian word "Hazra" (lit. present). Some theorize there were originally going to be one thousand hymns in the work rather than the present ten. Others, such as Dharam Pal Ashta in The Poetry of the Dasam Granth (1959), postulate that the hazare word should be interpreted as meaning "fountain".

The composition is unique in the Dasam Granth in that it is arranged alongside raga metres, similar to the Guru Granth Sahib. The specific raga meant to be utilized for each hymn in mentioned directly in the work.

According to Rattan Singh Jaggi in Dasam Granth Da Kartritav (1966), the composition is not present in many early manuscript copies of the Dasam Granth.

"Shabad Hazare" is a term that can also refer to a specific group of seven hymns from the Guru Granth Sahib which should not be confused with this work.

=== Mittar pyare nu ===
The sixth hymn is as follows:

Tell the beloved friend about the state of his devotees.

Without you, we feel sick wrapping ourselves in our quilts, it's like living in a snakepit.

The flask is a thorn in the side, the cup a dagger, it's like enduring the butcher's blows.

Better to sleep on the ground near the beloved; staying in the village is like being in a furnace.

— Guru Gobind Singh, Shabad Hazare, Hymn no.6 (Mittar Pyare Nu)

It is believed the sixth hymn was composed by the tenth Guru in the Machhiwara jungle after the deaths of all his sons. It is composed in Punjabi.

== List of hymns ==
1. Re man aiso kar sanyasa - Raga Ramkali
2. Re man iha bidha jog kamao - Raga Ramkali
3. Prani param purakh pag lago - Raga Ramkali
4. Prabh ju tu keh laaj hamari - Raga Sorath
5. Bin kartar na kirtam mano - Raga Kalyan
6. Mittar pyare nu - Khayal
7. Kewal kal hi kartar - Raga Tilang Kaafi
8. So kim manas roop kahai - Raga Bilawal
9. Ek bin dusar na ko chinar - Raga Devgandhari
10. Bin har naam na bachan paayi hai - Raga Devgandhari
