= Lynching of Jagmael Singh =

Lynching in Punjab, India

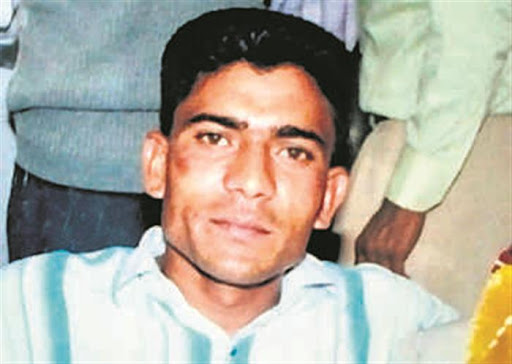
- An image of Jagmael Singh, given by his family.

- Lynching of Jagmael Singh (Punjab) Lynching of Jagmael Singh (India)
- Location: Sangrur, Punjab, India
- Date: 7 November 2019
- Target: Jagmael Singh
- Attack type: Mob lynching
- Deaths: 1 (Jagmael Singh)
- Perpetrators: Rinku, Goli, Bitu, Lucky Singh
- Accused: 4

On 7 November 2019, 37-year old Jagmael Singh (Note: Jagmail Singh is also written as Jagmael Singh.) was lynched in Sangrur, Punjab, India. He was brutally beaten by four men and was forced to drink human urine. He died after 9 days of treatment in Chandigarh. He was a construction worker and one of the accused, Rinku, had quarreled with him over Jagmael sitting with them in a Panchayati of upper caste.

It was said that Jagmael was taken to Rinku's house, where he was tied and brutally lynched and tortured by the four men. His death caused an outrage and many Dalit groups demanded severe punishment for the accused.

== Events ==
Jagmael Singh was a lower caste Dalit construction worker from Sangrur district of Punjab. He was a poor man and lived in a family of six people in the village of Changiwala with his mother, wife Manjit Kaur, two daughters and a son.

On 6 November 2019, Singh went to a village panchayat of upper-caste Sikhs in Sangrur chotal where he had a fight with Rinku. Some time later, Rinku, along with his three friends arrived and kidnapped Singh. They took him to the Rinku's house on 7 November and tied him after which they beat him brutally and was also tortured severely by the four. He was also forced to drink their urine, after that they pulled his thigh skin with pliers causing infection. Later the four went from there and left him to die. On the same date his friends and relatives searched and found him in very bad state and immediately took him to PGI Chandigarh where he was treated for 9 days, but to the infection in his thighs (due to pulling of his skin by pliers) he didn't survive.

== Response ==
The family of Jagmael demanded a strong enquiry to investigate the case and also stated that the all four accused moved freely and instead they were investigated by the police officials. But when the matter came into the media, the police started operating and investigating the case and a complaint was registered against the four on the account of IPC - 302 (Murder) and IPC - 353 (SC/ST Act). The government gave the family a compensation amount of ₹5,000,000 (equivalent to ₹6.8 million or US$70,000 in 2026) and a government job to one family member. The family members also demanded the Capital punishment for the accused. (Note: The family of Jaegmal Singh demanded a Capital punishment for the murder accused.)

There were also a series of protests by the family members of the victim and many Dalit organizations regarding the matter and the DGP of Punjab Police also assured the family members to investigate the case as their priority.
