= Sadh Belo =

Indus river island

Sadh Belo Island Temple
- سادھ بھيلو
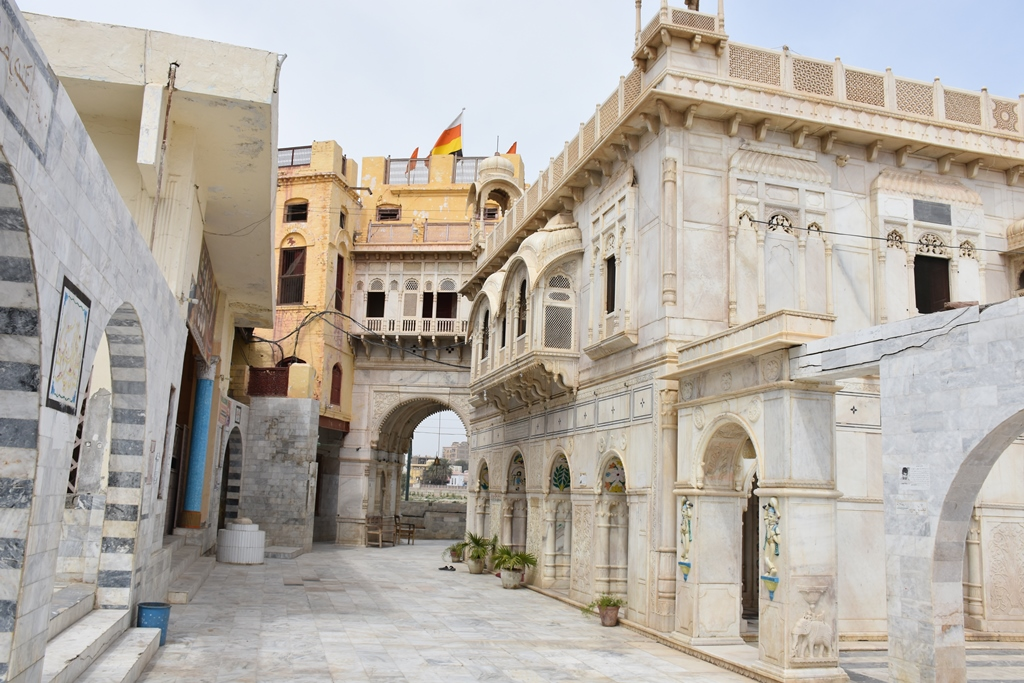
- Temple in the Sadh Belo Island, Sukkur, Pakistan.

- Location within Sindh Location within Pakistan

Religion
- Affiliation: Hinduism
- District: Sukkur
- Deity: Shiva
- Festivals: Shivratri, Bankhandi Maharaj Mela (death anniversary of Bankhandi Maharaj)
- Governing body: Pakistan Hindu Council

Location
- Location: Sadh Belo
- State: Sindh
- Country: Pakistan
- Coordinates: 27°41′37.6″N 68°52′43.5″E

Architecture
- Type: Hindu temple
- Creator: Sant Harnam Das
- Established: 1823 (place); 1899 (temple)
- Temple: 9

Website
- Pakistan Hindu Council

Sadh Belo (Sindhi: ساڌ ٻيلو, Urdu: سادھ بھيلو), also spelt as Sadh Bela, or Sat, is an island in the Indus River near Sukkur, Sindh, Pakistan that is famous for its highly revered Hindu temples. The temples are associated with the syncretic Udasi movement of Sikhism. The island is famous for Teerath Asthan which is the biggest Hindu temple in Pakistan. The complex has eight other temples, a library, dining areas, a huge garden, along with rooms and residences for monks and people who want to stay on the island on a spiritual retreat.

== Etymology ==
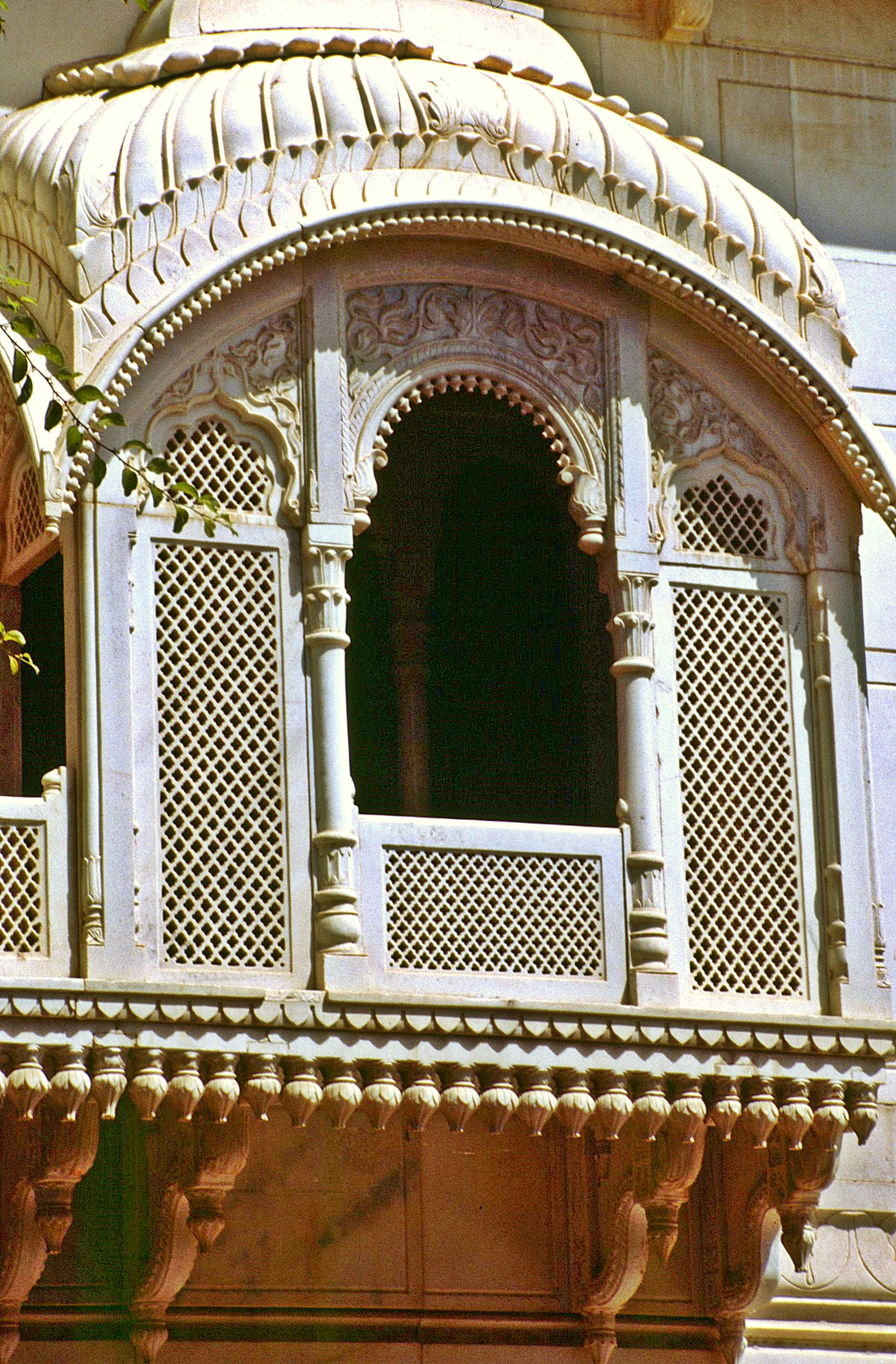
The shrine features intricate marble work.

The island was once a forested island and was called Menak Parbat. Later the Udasi saint (sage) Baba Bankhandi Maharaj settled here and then this place became known as the Sadhu Bhelo, meaning the woods of the sage. According to some sources, the Sadh Belo is named after an Arab commander named "Saeed" (Arabic: سعید), who occupied and was stationed on the island.

== Geography ==
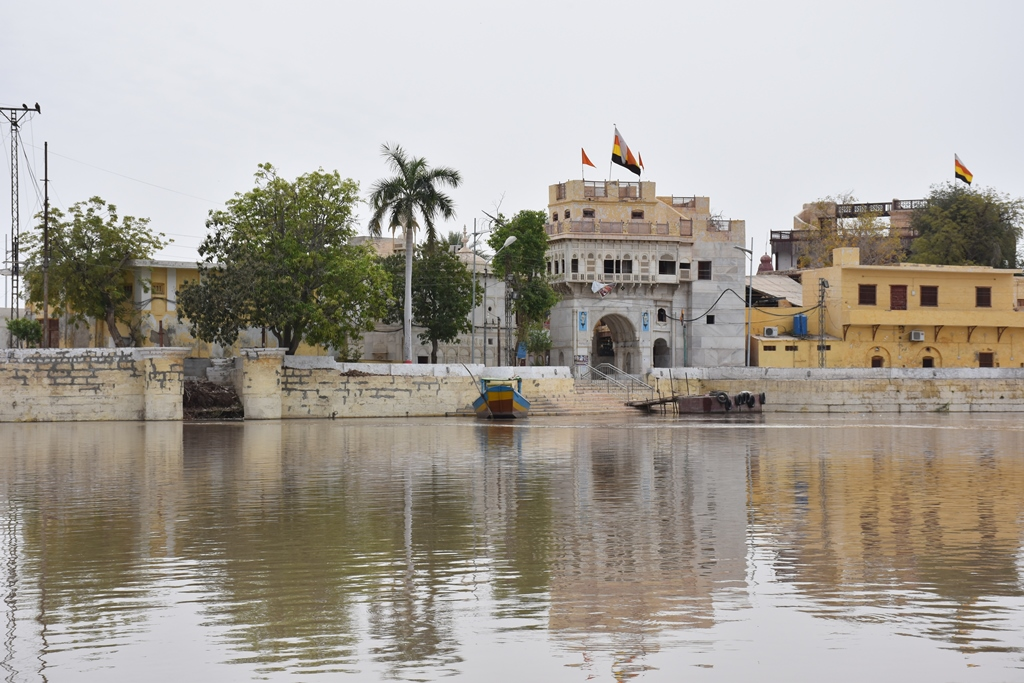
Sadh bela

Sadh Belo island is downstream from Bukkur island, and is separated from it by a short stretch of river. It is located on the River Indus flowing between Rohri and Sukkur. The temple complex is spread on two interconnected islands; Sadh Belo having kitchen, verandah, many temples, and Deen Belo which houses samadhis, a park, and Rishi Nol mandir.

== Religious significance ==
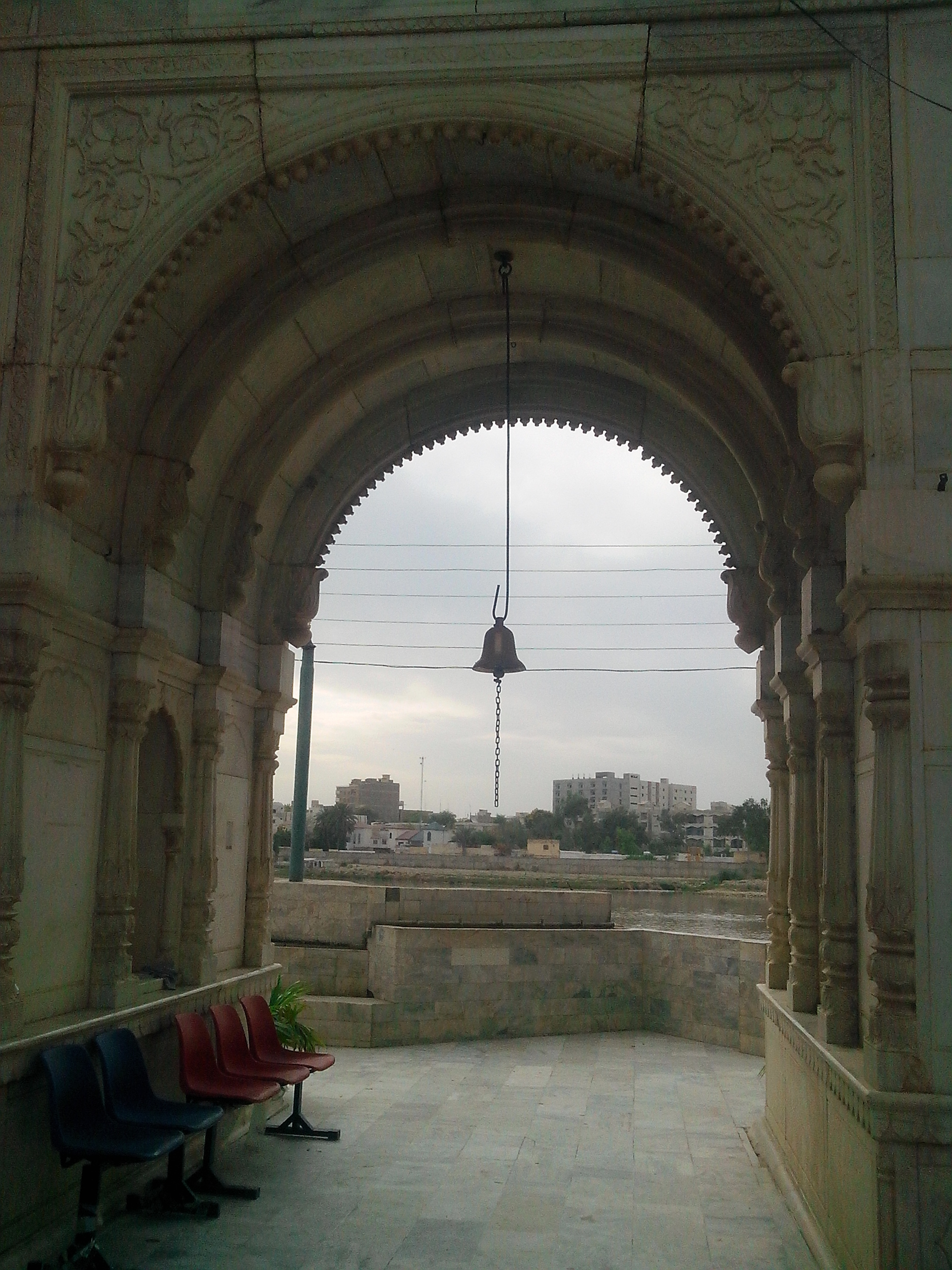
Sadh Belo temple

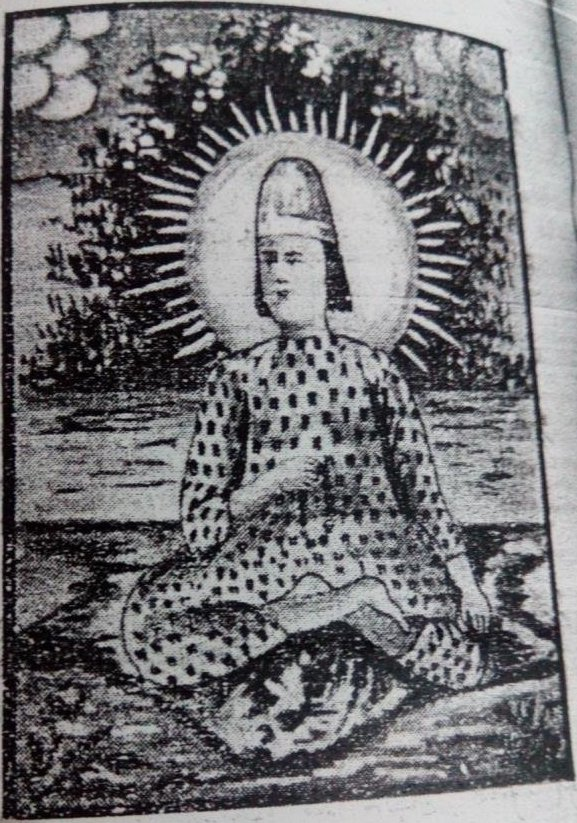
Depiction of Bankhandi Maharaj, an Udasi saint who founded Sadh Belo in 1823

Baba Bankhandi Maharaj (born as Balchand Sharma), a 15-year-old spiritual seeker, whose origins were reportedly either from Kero Khetar near Delhi, or Nepal, arrived in Sindh in 1823, in the town of Sukkur, which was then a major trading hub for the Subcontinent. He settled in the forested island of Menak Parbat (which is Sadhu Bela's original name), alone, and became known as the sage of the woods. The island was just a clump of trees when Bankhandi first arrived there, but he liked the place so much that he chose it as a place to set up his dhuni (sacred fire). It is said that once Baba Bankhandi saw Annapurna, the goddess of grain, in a dream. She gave him an oblong metal object called Kamandal and told him that, as long as this object is in the complex, there won't be any shortage of grain for the community kitchen. Later, Baba Bankhandi established various places of worship, including temples, dedicated to Annapurna, Hanuman, Ganesh and Shiv Shankar, and places for Granth Sahib and Bhagavad Gita. Baba Bankhandi died at the age of 60. Baba Bankhandi had many disciples who succeeded him one by one as the mahant or custodian of the place; the most notable among them are Swami Achal Prasad, Swami Mohan Das, and Swami Harnarain Das Udasin.

== Temples ==
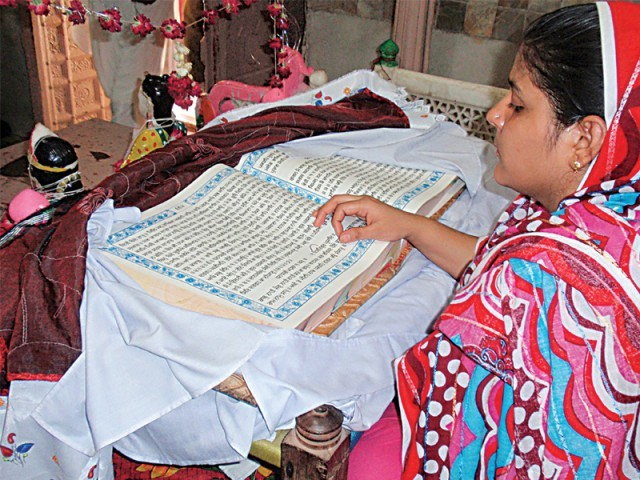
A woman reciting the Guru Granth Sahib at the Sadh Belo temple on the special occasion of the 150th death anniversary of Baba Bhankandi Maharaj

The temple was initially constructed in 1899 by the eighth gaddi nashin Sant Harnam Das. The place is held in high esteem by Hindus throughout Sindh and even in India, occasionally attracting pilgrims from across the border. The annual death anniversary of Baba Bankhandi Maharaj called the Baba Bankhandi Maharaj Mela attended by thousands and is celebrated by a three-day festival in which pilgrims are provided with free lodging, food, and water. One of the unique feature about Sadhu Belo is that many prayers and texts are written here in Sindhi, the language of the Sindh province in Pakistan. The security system is very tight nobody can enter or visit the temple without having permission; there is a proper way to get permission from Pakistan Hindu Panchayat. For non-Hindus, it's difficult due to the security system because Sadh Belo is the biggest temple in Pakistan.

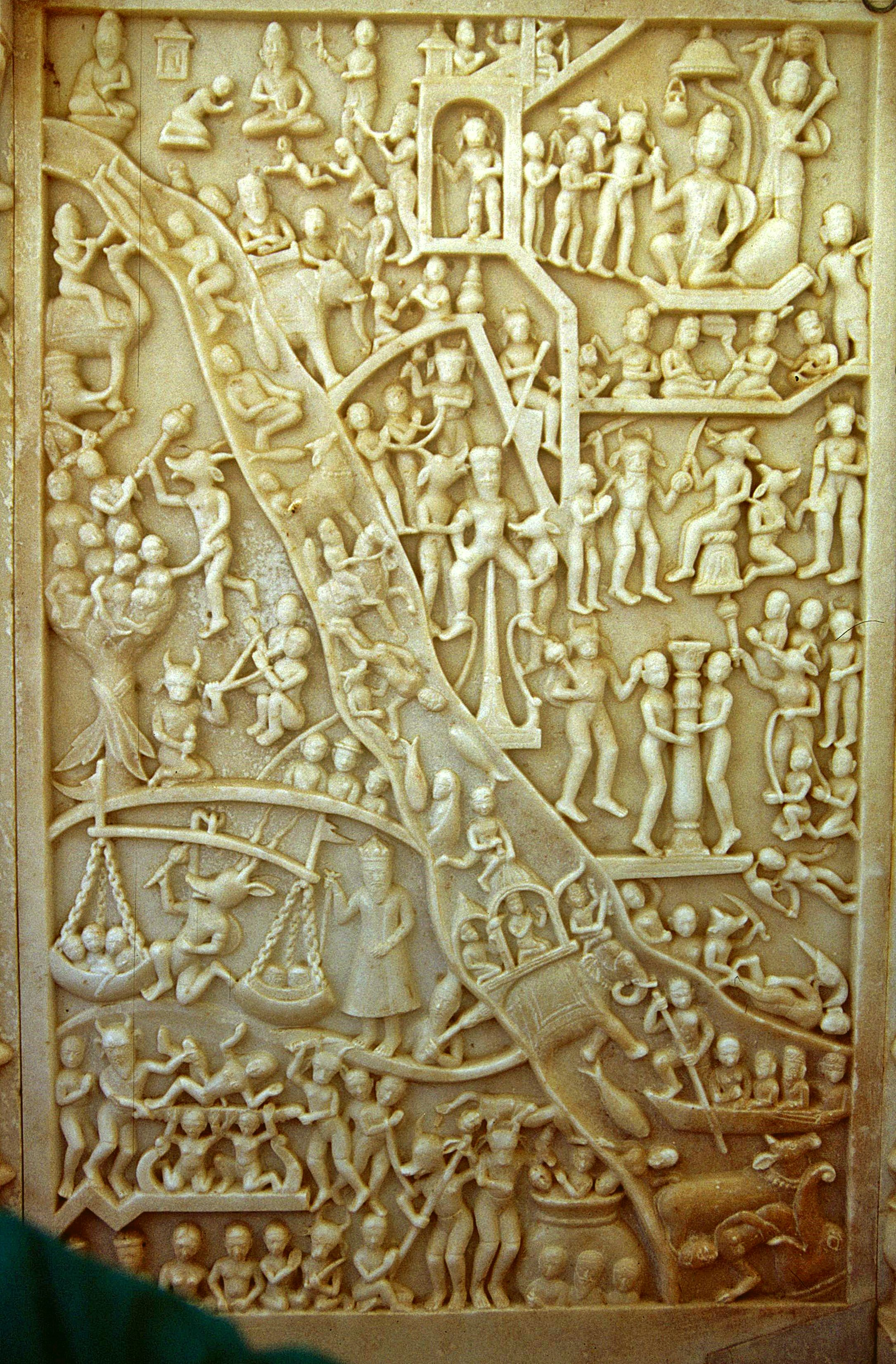
Details on wall of temple.

The ‘gaddi nasheen’ of the temple (the family that has been managing the temple complex for generations) moved to India after Partition in 1947. But members of the family still travel once a year to Pakistan to officially open and attend the fair, as symbolic keepers of the temple complex. Currently, Sadh Belo is under the custody of Evacuee Trust Property Board and is managed well, but the absence of the former administration of Udasi mahants is felt immensely.

== Leaders ==
Spiritual leaders of Sadh Belo are referred to as gaddi nashin, some are as follows:

- Baba Bankhandi Maharaj (1st)
- Swami Achal Prasad
- Swami Mohan Das
- Swami Harnarain Das Udasin
- Sant Harnam Das (8th)
- Swami Gauri Shankar Das (10th)
- Swami Vish Darsh (11th)

== Gallery ==
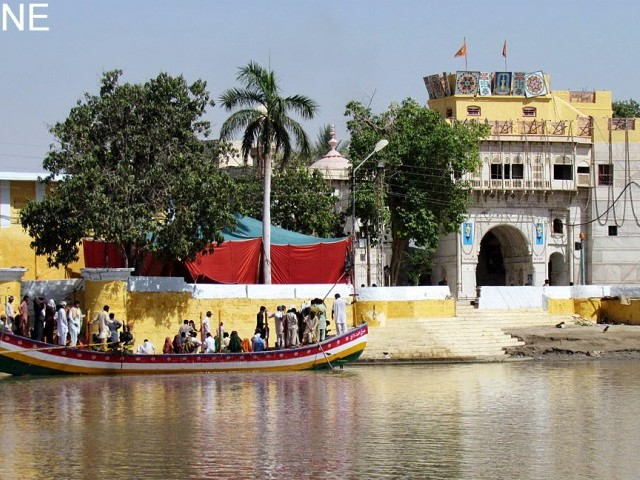
Devotees reach the Sadh Belo temple, which is situated in the middle of the Indus River.

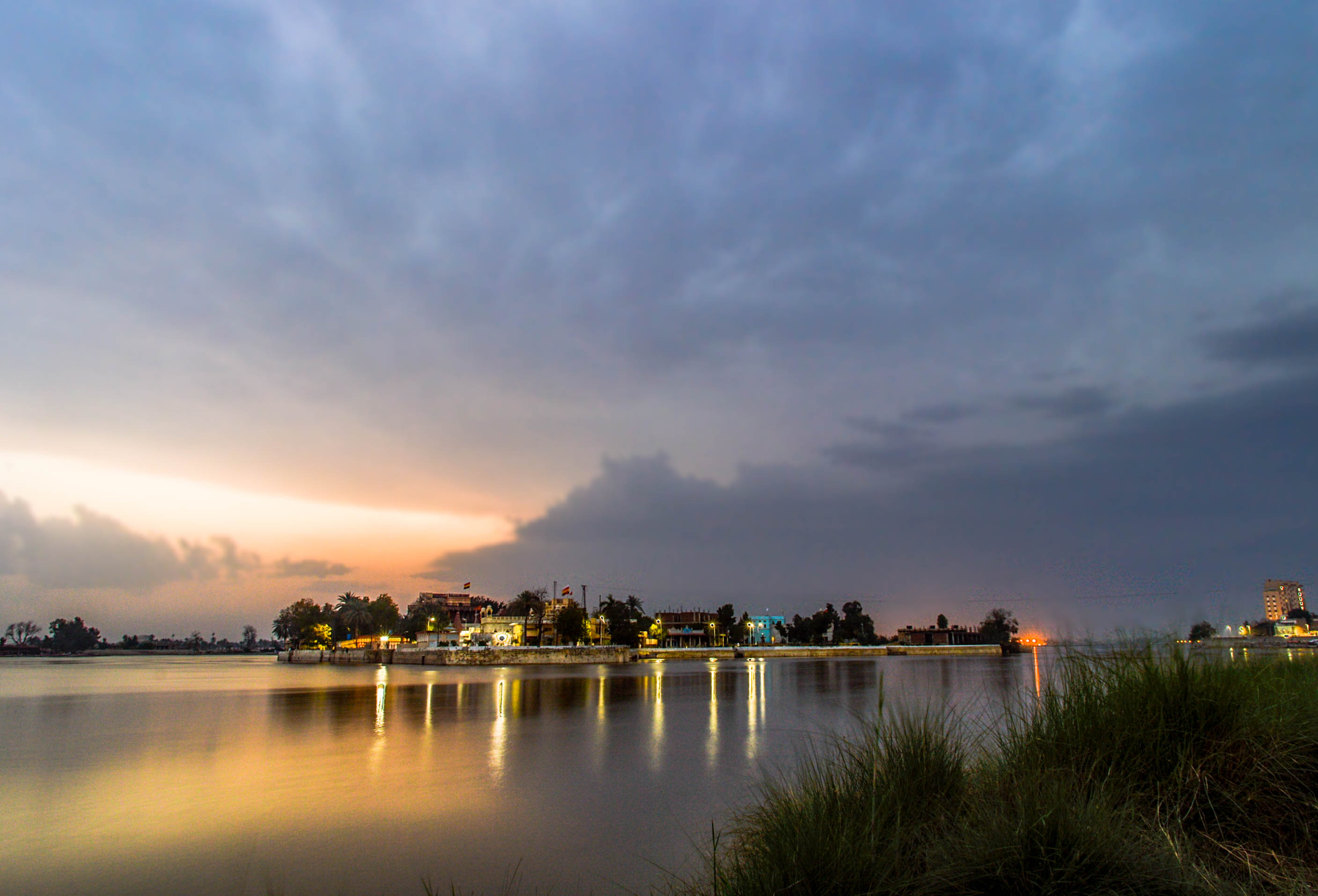
The temple complex at night

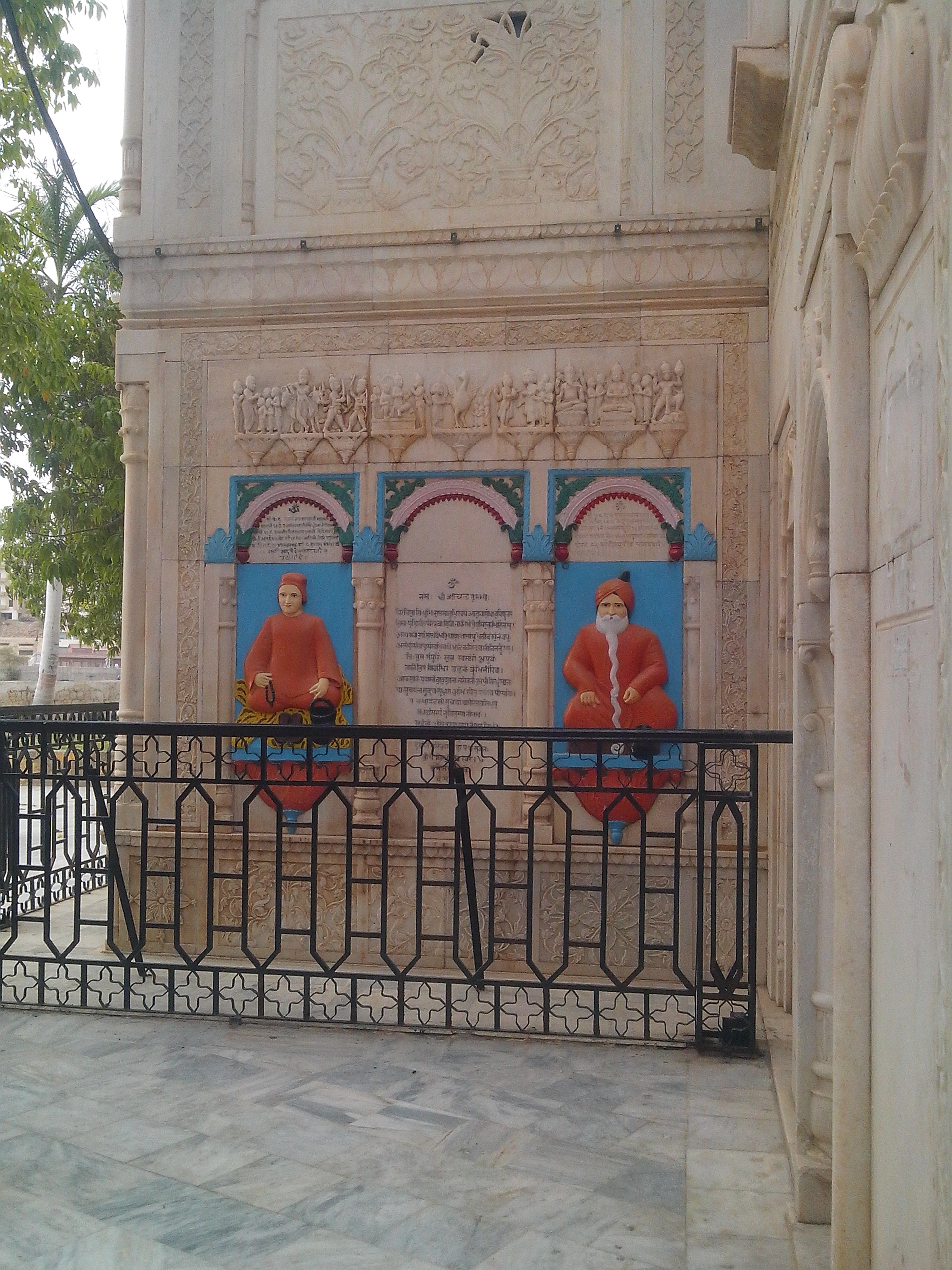
Memorials to Udasi mahants with an invocation to Sri Chand, the founder of Udasis.

== See also ==
- Hinduism in Pakistan
- Katasraj temple
- Tilla Jogian
