= Gaddi Nashin =

Term to refer to leaders amongst various Sikh sects

The Gaddi Nashin, alternatively spelt as Gaddi Nasheen, is a term to refer to a leader in various Sikh sects, Ravidassia, and also Sufi groups.

== Etymology ==
The Persian origin term Gaddi Nashin, composite of gaddi literally meaning "carpets" or "bolster" but metaphorically meaning "seat" or "position", and nashin (also spelled nasheen) meaning a holder or occupier of a certain position.

== Usage ==
=== Sikhism ===
==== Minas ====
The Sodhi descendants of the heretical Mina sect of Sikhism in Guru Harsahai use the title of Gaddi Nashin for themselves and maintain a guruship lineage originating from Prithi Chand.

==== Udasis ====
Whilst usually the leader of an Udasi group or seat is known as a mahant, there are some Udasi groups who employ the term Gaddi Nashin instead. The Udasi mahant leaders of the Sadh Belo complex in Sindh use the term to refer to their seat of leadership. The gaddi nashin holder shifted to India following the 1947 partition of India. Many other Udasi groups in Sindh also employ the term gaddi nashin.

=== Ravidassia ===
The term is used for the leader of the Ravidass Deras in the Ravidassia religion. The religion's founder Guru Ravidass is worshipped as Guru, and the Gaddi Nashin are considered a messenger of God following the Guru (Spiritual Leader). Only one Gaddi Nashin holds the position at a time, as the highest-ranking member of the religion. Below him are a large number of Ravidassia Sant Samaj who work under the leader, directing and giving instructions relating to affairs and matters of the religion.

The current Gaddi Nashin is Niranjan Dass who has been holding that position since 24 November 2007.

==== Previous holders ====
- Pipal Dass (1895 to 1928CE)
- Sarwan Dass (1928 to 1972)
- Hari Dass (1972 to 1982)
- Garib Dass (1982 to 1994)
- Niranjan Dass (current)

=== Sufism ===
In Sufism Gaddi Nasheen is also used and it also refers as Trustee and is the successor of a Sufi or Pir and in some instances descendant of a disciple of a Sufi. The Gaddi looks after the shrine and carries out significant rituals in the Dargah and are responsible in looking after the Mazaar Sharif (mausoleum). A trustee is a key person who held and leads the traditional Sufi rituals in Dargah's daily activities and particularly during Urs—(death anniversary). There are many well known Gaddi Nasheens within the Sufiana Darbar's in Punjab.

In Sufi’s term the most famous Gaddi Nashin of Mohra Sharif Rawalpindi is Pir Mujtaba Farooq Gul Badshah. He is the current Sajjada Nashin, Successor and Chief Custodian of Mohra Sharif Rawalpindi.

== See also ==
- Guru
- Guru-shishya parampara
- Guru Gaddi
