= Mohan Singh Nagoke =

Indian politician

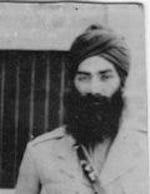

Jathedar of the Akal Takht
- In office 1935–1952
- Preceded by: Vasakha Singh Dadehar
- Succeeded by: Partap Singh

President of SGPC
- In office 19 November 1944 – 28 June 1948
- Preceded by: Tara Singh
- Succeeded by: Udham Singh Nagoke

Member of Punjab Legislative Assembly from Tarn Taran
- In office 1952–1957
- Preceded by: Post Established
- Succeeded by: Gurdial Singh Dhillon
- In office 1967–1969
- Preceded by: Gurdial Singh Dhillon
- Succeeded by: Manjinder Singh

Personal details
- Born: 25 December 1898 Nagoke Village, Amritsar (now in Tarn Taran), India
- Died: 2 March 1969 (aged 70) Amritsar, Punjab, India
- Party: Shiromani Akali Dal (till 1948), (1957–1962); Indian National Congress (1948–1957); Akali Dal Sant (1962–1969)
- Children: 1

Mohan Singh Nagoke (25 December 1898– 2 March 1969) was a politician from Punjab (India), freedom fighter and former Jathedar of Akal Takht Sahib.

== Early life ==
Mohan Singh Nagoke was from a middle-class family. His Father Tahil Singh was a modest farmer. Mohan Singh did his matriculation from Khalsa College, Amritsar in 1918. Later he joined service in the office of Deputy commissioner of Amritsar. In a Jaito-ka-morcha, he also got shot in him thigh. He resigned from the job in protest against Jallianwala Bagh massacre.

== Later life ==
Mohan Singh joined the Jatha (group of protesters) in 1924 to Jaito in Nabha State against the atrocities by Britishers in Gurdwara Gangsar Jaito. He was also injured in the firing of Police but after treatment he again joined the protest. He remained in jail from 1924 to 1925.

In 1926 joined Shiromani Gurdwara Prabandhak Committee. Then he appointed the Jathedar of Akal Takht from 1935 to 1952. During his tenure he also became the President of SGPC. As President he gave special attention to bringing symmetry to the Harimandir Sahib surrounding.

After the Independence he joined Congress party in 1948 with other Akali politician. In 1952 he contested Punjab Assembly election from Tarn Taran Assembly constituency and won the election. He again elected in 1967 on the ticket of Akali Dal Sant. He also served the member of Punjab Subordinate Service Selection Board from 1958 to 1963.

He died on 2 March 1969 after a prolonged illness in Amritsar.
