= Dilawar Singh =

Indian Sikh militant (1970–1995)

Dilawar Singh Babbar
- Born: 18 August 1970; Panjgrain, Punjab, India
- Died: 31 August 1995 (aged 25); Chandigarh, India
- Cause of death: Suicide bombing
- Known for: Assassination of Beant Singh
- Parent(s): Harnek Singh; Surjit Kaur

Dilawar Singh (18 August 1970 – 31 August 1995) was the assassin of Beant Singh, the chief minister of Punjab, India amid the insurgency in Punjab. He was a serving Punjab Police officer and became a suicide bomber for the Babbar Khalsa International. He assassinated Beant Singh by blowing up his bullet-proof car at 5 p.m. on 31 August 1995 in the city of Chandigarh killing the chief minister and 17 others.

== Family ==
Dilawar Singh's mother, Surjit Kaur, and father, Baba Harnek Singh, live in Guru Nanak Nagar, Patiala, Punjab, India. His father was a government employee. Dilawar Singh had two brothers.

== Assassination of Beant Singh ==
In Punjab between 1992 and 1995, at a time when the Khalistan movement was active in the state and the Indian government was aggressively seeking to control the movement, during Beant Singh's tenure, It is alleged that many innocent Sikhs were killed unlawfully.

Dilawar Singh, who was a police constable at that time, conspired with Balwant Singh Rajoana, a police officer, to kill Beant Singh. The attack on 31 August 1995 resulted in the death of Beant Singh, Dilawar Singh and 17 others, and, on 25 December 1997, backup police officer Rajoana confessed his involvement while blaming the Indian government that it has murdered its own innocent people and promoted and honored the killers of Sikhs including chief minister Beant Singh. He refused to contest the court proceedings because of his lack of trust in the Indian judicial system, and death penalty was awarded to him.

== Aftermath ==
On 23 March 2012, he was awarded with the title of "National Martyr" (Quomi Shaheed) by Giani Gurbachan Singh jathedar of the Akal Takht, the highest temporal seat of the Khalsa. In 2017, the Sikh body hailed him as a "great martyr" and a request was made for his portrait to be installed at the Sikh museum. His portrait was installed in the Central Sikh Museum in 2022.

The Khalsa Action Committee (KAC), an umbrella organization of several Sikh organizations, honoured the father and mother of Dilawar Singh, Harnek Singh and Surjit Kaur with the Shaheed Baba Deep Singh gold medal at a function in the city of Amritsar.
