= Giani Kuldeep Singh Gargaj =

Acting Jathedar of Akal Takht, Sikh preacher

Singh Sahib Giani Kuldeep Singh Gargaj
- Singh in 2025

Jathedar of the Akal Takht (Acting)
- Incumbent
- Assumed office 7 March 2025 Serving with Dhian Singh Mand
- Appointed by: SGPC
- Preceded by: Giani Raghbir Singh

Jathedar of the Takht Kesgarh Sahib
- Incumbent
- Assumed office 7 March 2025
- Appointed by: SGPC
- Preceded by: Giani Sultan Singh

Personal details
- Born: 1985 (age 40–41) Jabbowal village, Amritsar, Punjab
- Education: Sikh Missionary College (Giani, Diploma in Sikh Studies); Guru Nanak Dev University (MA, BA)
- Occupation: Sikh preacher

Giani Kuldeep Singh Gargaj (born c. 1985) is an Indian Sikh preacher and the acting Jathedar of the Akal Takht. He also serves as the Jathedar of Takht Sri Kesgarh Sahib at Anandpur Sahib, Punjab.

== Early life ==
Giani Kuldeep Singh Gargaj was born in Jabbowal village in Amritsar district, Punjab, India. He was raised in an Amritdhari Sikh family.

He holds a Master of Arts in History and a Diploma in Sikh Studies from Sikh Missionary College, Ludhiana.

== Religious and social work ==
Gargaj began working as a kathā-vācak Sikh preacher in the early 2000s.

Reports have described his preaching work as including Sikh religious texts such as Sri Gur Partap Suraj Granth, Prachin Panth Parkash, and the Sikh Rehat Maryada. He has also been reported to be involved in social welfare and education-related work for underprivileged children and orphans.

== Appointment as Jathedar ==
In March 2025, the SGPC appointed Gargaj as the Jathedar of Takht Sri Kesgarh Sahib at Anandpur Sahib and as the acting Jathedar of Akal Takht at Amritsar.

== Tenure and activities ==
After his appointment, Gargaj made statements relating to the use of the Akal Takht's name by organisations and groups. He said that no group should claim to operate under Akal Takht patronage without formal approval.

In April 2025, he urged the governments of India and Pakistan to reopen the Kartarpur Corridor for pilgrims.

== Controversies ==
Gargaj's appointment was opposed by some Sikh organisations, including the Damdami Taksal and sections of the Nihang orders. The opposition related to the SGPC's procedure for appointing him.

In May 2025, Rozana Spokesman reported that Takht Sri Patna Sahib had declared Gargaj tankhāīyā, a term used in Sikh religious discipline for a person held liable for religious misconduct. The matter was reported in the context of disputes among Sikh religious authorities.

== Significance ==
Gargaj has been reported as one of the younger Sikh preachers to hold the position of acting Jathedar of the Akal Takht.

== See also ==
- Akal Takht
- Shiromani Gurdwara Parbandhak Committee
- Takht Sri Kesgarh Sahib
- Sikh Missionary College
