= Giani Gurbachan Singh =

Jathedar of Akal Takht (2008–2018)

Jathedar of the Akal Takht (Note: The Sarbat Khalsa in 2015 appointed Jagtar Singh Hawara as the jathedar and Dhian Singh Mand as the acting jathedar since Hawara was imprisoned. The SGPC however refused to recognise its decisions.)
- In office 6 August 2008 – 18 October 2018 (Disputed with Dhian Singh Mand from 10 November 2015)
- Appointed by: SGPC
- Preceded by: Joginder Singh Vedanti
- Succeeded by: Giani Harpreet Singh

Personal details
- Born: Gurbachan Singh; 6 April 1948 (age 78) Chakk Baja, East Punjab, India

Giani Gurbachan Singh (born 6 April 1948) is a Sikh preacher who served as the jathedar of the Akal Takht from 2008 to 2018.

== Early life ==
Gurbachan Singh was born in village Chakk Baja of Muktsar, Punjab, India on 6 April 1948. He joined Shiromani Gurdwara Parbandhak Committee as a granthi on 29 February 1972 of Gurdwara Darbar Sahib in Muktsar, where he became the head granthi in 1996. On 28 September 2002, there was a recording of him doing the evening prayer Rehras Sahib at the Golden Temple. The album was named Sodar Rehraas

== Jathedar of the Akal Takht (2008–2018) ==
Subsequent to the dismissal of Joginder Singh Vedanti, the Shiromani Gurdwara Parbandhak Committee appointed Singh as the jathedar of the Akal Takht on 6 August 2008.

=== Honoring Parkash Singh Badal ===
Along with jathedars of the other four takhts, Singh awarded the titles of Panth Rattan (jewel of the community) and Fakhr-e-Qaum (pride of the nation) to then Chief Minister Parkash Singh Badal. He was awarded this title from the Akal Takht for his service to the Sikh community, for imprisonment and atrocities faced during various Akali movements and for building Virasat-e-Khalsa. A Sarbat Khalsa held on 10 November 2015 withdrew the title due to allegations of civil rights violations and failure to recognize the oppression faced by the Sikhs in Punjab.

=== Pardoning Gurmeet Ram Rahim Singh ===
In October 2015, the five beloved of the Akal Takht: Satnam Singh Khanda, Mangal Singh, Tarlok Singh, Satnam Singh and Major Singh summoned Singh along with jathedars of the other four takhts: Mal Singh, Gurmukh Singh, Iqbal Singh and Ram Singh to clarify their reason for pardoning Dera Sacha Sauda head Gurmeet Ram Rahim Singh for the imitation of Guru Gobind Singh in 2007. After the jathedars refused to recognise the summon, the five beloved directed the Shiromani Gurdwara Parbandhak Committee to dismiss the jathedars from their duties. The Shiromani Committee ignored the gurmata and instead suspended the five beloved. The jatherdars later revoked their decision to pardon Gurmeet Ram Rahim Singh.

=== 2015 Sarbat Khalsa ===
A Sarbat Khalsa convened by Sikh organisations at Chabba village in Amritsar, Punjab dismissed Singh and declared Jagtar Singh Hawara as the jathedar of Akal Takht on 10 November 2015. Due to the political imprisonment of Hawara, the deliberative assembly appointed Dhian Singh Mand as the acting jathedar. However, Avtar Singh Makkar, the then president of the Shiromani Gurdwara Parbandhak Committee condemned the convening as against the principles of Sikhism and its decisions null and void.

After being continuously pressured by the Sikhs to resign, Singh gave his resignation citing health reasons to the Shiromani Committee president Gobind Singh Longowal on 18 October 2018. The Shiromani Committee executive held a meeting at the Teja Singh Samundri Hall in Amritsar and assigned Harpreet Singh as the acting jathedar of the Akal Takht on 22 October 2018.
