= Sarbat Khalsa (1986) =

Sikh community, as well as a special group of initiated Sikhs

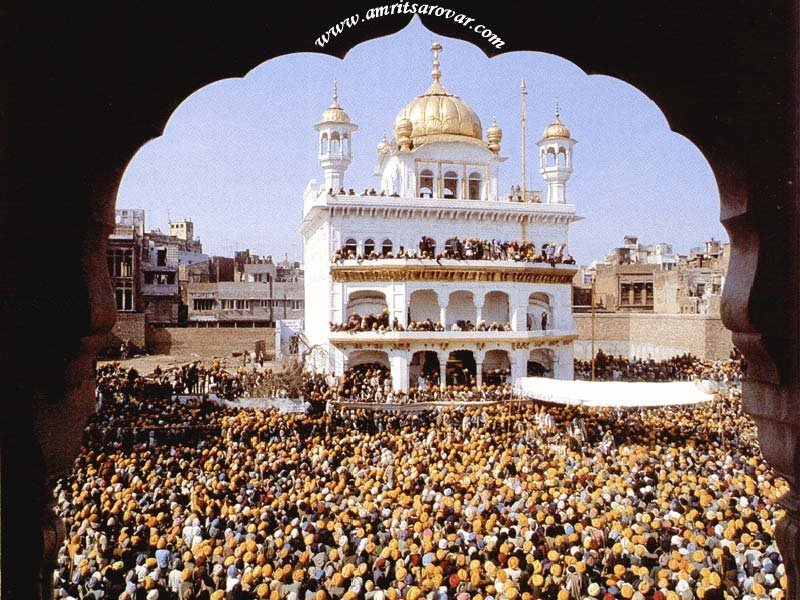
The 1986 Sarbat Khalsa gathering at the Akal Takht on Vaisakhi (13 April 1986)

The Sarbat Khalsa of 1986 was one congregation of the Guru Khalsa Panth, including the Damdami Taksal, Akal Takht, Panthic Committee (Manochahal), Panthic Committee (Zaffarwal), Kharku Sikhs, Tarna Dal (Hariabelan), Tarna Dal (Baba Bakala), Bidhi Chand Dal and the Shiromani Budha Dal.

== Events ==
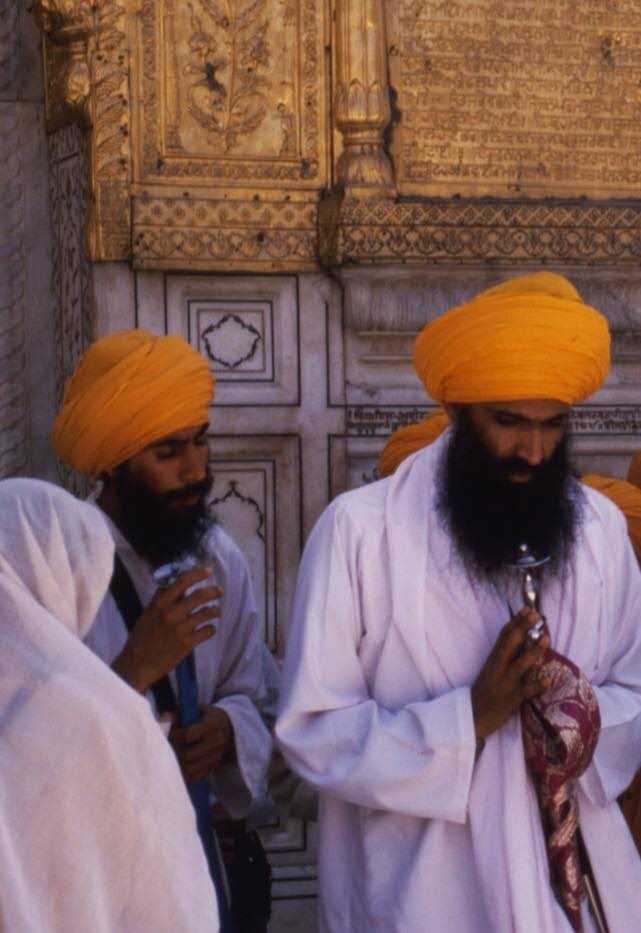
Jathedar Gurdev Singh Kaunke standing with his sword in front of the Golden Temple during the Sarbat Khalsa. Karnail Dhanna Singh is standing beside him.

The Sarbat Khalsa was declared on 16 January 1986 by the Damdami Taksal and the Kharku organizations. On 19 January, Surjit Singh Barnala's Barnala Jatha along with the Punjab Police attacked the Golden Temple, and 200 shots were fired in the complex towards them and away from them. Afterwards far more support had arrived for the Sarbat Khalsa, they occupied the offices of the Damdami Taksal. On 20 January they were expelled by the Kharkus at gunpoint. The Sarbat Khalsa's official date was 13 April 1986, on Vaisakhi.

The Sarbat Khalsa was hosted by the Panj Pyare who went as the Panthic Committee. They were Jathedar Gurdev Singh Kaunke, Baba Gurbachan Singh Manochahal, Karnail Dhanna Singh, Jarnail Aroor Singh and Jarnail Wassan Singh Zaffarwal. During the Sarbat Khalsa an official declaration of Khalistan was made and the War for Khalistan against the Indian and Pakistani Governments was announced to the congregation of 600,000 Sikh. Further an official army to fight for Khalistan was created. It was the Khalistan Commando Force. The dissolution of the SGPC was also announced.

The Shiromani Akali Dal held a Sarbat Khalsa in Anandpur Sahib in protest to the Sarbat Khalsa in Amritsar and the Mahimanas (guests) included Bibi Bimal Kaur Khalsa, Sant Thakur Singh Bhindranwale and Simranjit Singh Mann. After the Panj Pyare and the Mahimanas met and devised a plan for the betterment of the Guru Khalsa Panth and Sikh Qaum, all their Gurmattas were announced on loudspeaker to the entire congregation by Baba Gurbachan Singh Manochahal. Generally all Sikhs wore Kesri turbans, along with long Kirpans and other weapons.

After the Gurmata came of the declaration of the Khalistan Liberation War and the Khalistan Confederacy the entire GurSangat was made to oblige to them, they gave Jaikaras and raised their swords and guns in the air in celebration. Multiple new war cries also came up such as "Bhindranwale Sant Sipahi, Sarkar ko kare Jhatkai" and "Beant Satwant Zindabad". They also declared the Tankhaiya of Jathedar Santa Singh Nihang, and Jathedar Amrik Singh Nihang was made the new Jathedar of the Budha Dal. Jathedar Kirpal Singh was also boycotted from the Akal Takht. There was also a formation of four Panthic Committees, the Panthic Committee (Manochahal), Dooja Panthic Committee, Panthic Committee (Zaffarwal) and Panthic Committee (Babbar). They also declared rebuilding of the Akal Takht and destroyed the earlier structure, due to the earlier one being done by the Indian Government and was known as the 'Sarkar Takht'. Behind the Akal Takht the Sikhs did a 22 gun salute, one more than the President's gun salute, to show their dominance over India.

After the Sarbat Khalsa, Operation Search was conducted on the 30 April 1986, they found no militants and one policeman was killed. They were only able to find one .12 bore shotgun and two Mausers.
