= Teja Singh Akarpuri =

Indian politician (1892-1975)

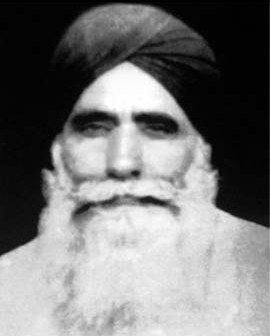

Jathedar of the Akal Takht
- In office 29 April 1921 – 13 October 1923
- Preceded by: Teja Singh Bhuchar
- Succeeded by: Udham Singh Nagoke
- In office 27 November 1926 – 21 January 1930
- Preceded by: Jawaher Singh
- Succeeded by: Didar Singh

Personal details
- Born: Teja Singh; 22 July 1892 Gurdaspur, Panjab
- Died: 20 November 1975 (aged 83) Akarpura, Gurdaspur, Panjab
- Education: Khalsa Collegiate School, Amritsar

Teja Singh Akarpuri (1892 – 20 November 1975) was an Indian and Sikh politician who served as the 11th Jathedar of Akal Takht from 1921 to 1923 and 1926 to 1930. He was the First MP from Gurdaspur constituency In Lok Sabha from 1952 to 1957 and was succeeded by Diwan Chand Sharma.

== Early life ==
Teja Singh was born in the Gurdaspur district of the Punjab. His father was Pala Singh and mother Partap Kaur. He matriculated from Khalsa Collegiate School, Amritsar, in 1911, and enlisted in the 24th Sikh Battalion of the Indian Army the following year. Leaving the Army, he became a patvari in the revenue department of the Punjab at the end of 1914. He was promoted ziledar in 1918.

== Political career ==
After the Nankana Sahib massacre of February 1921, he resigned from government service and joined the Akali movement. The SGPC appointed him administrator of Gurdwara Premsati at Kamalia, in Montgomery District, now in Pakistan. In 1921, he was appointed Jathedar of Akal Takht, Amritsar. He was president of Sri Nankana Sahib management committee from 1935 to 1938. In the Punjab Assembly elections in January 1937, he contested the Batala constituency as a nominee of the Shiromani Akali Dal, but lost to Sir Sundar Singh Majithia, leader of the Khalsa National Party. He was again elected a member of the Shiromani Gurdwara Parbandhak Committee in 1939. He became 7th president of the Shiromani Akali Dal in 1940. He presided over the first Sarb Hind Akali Conference at Atari, in Amritsar district, on 10 February 1940. Jathedar Teja Singh Akarpuri was a member of the 1st Lok Sabha from 1952 to 1957 representing his native district, Gurdaspur. He died at his ancestral village Akarpura on 20 November 1975.
