= Sikh Missionary College =

- Formation: 30 May 1980
- Founder: Gursikhs from Delhi and Punjab
- Type: Religious and educational organisation
- Headquarters: Ludhiana, Punjab, India
- Location: India
- Official language: Punjabi, Hindi, English
- Founding president: S. Harbhajan Singh
- Website: https://sikhmissionarycollege.org/

Sikh Missionary College (SMC) (Punjabi: ਸਿੱਖ ਮਿਸ਼ਨਰੀ ਕਾਲਜ) is a Sikh religious and educational organisation based in Ludhiana, Punjab, India. According to the organisation, it was established on 30 May 1980 by Gursikhs from Delhi and Punjab. The college is involved in Sikh religious education, publications, correspondence courses and study circles.

== History ==
According to Sikh Missionary College, the organisation was established on 30 May 1980. A Supreme Council of nine founder members was formed, and S. Harbhajan Singh of Ludhiana was appointed as its first president.

The organisation states that its activities include Sikh religious education, publication of literature and the running of study circles. Its head office is located in Ludhiana, Punjab.

== Publications ==
Sikh Missionary College publishes Sikh Phulwari, a monthly magazine. A January 1985 issue of the magazine is listed in the South Asia Commons archive.

The magazine is published from the Ludhiana head office and contains material related to Sikh teachings, Sikh history, Gurbani, articles, poems and other religious and cultural topics.

== Educational initiatives ==
=== Sikh Missionary Correspondence Course ===
Sikh Missionary College offers a two-year correspondence course in Sikh studies. The course is intended for people who are unable to attend regular classes and includes material related to Sikh theology, Sikh history, Sikh philosophy and Gurbani interpretation.

==== Course features ====
The course has been described as including objective-type question papers, recommended reading lists, evaluation of submitted answer booklets and a record of marks. It is divided into eight trimesters over two years, and successful candidates receive a certificate of completion.

== Literature and research ==
Sikh Missionary College publishes books and other study material in Punjabi, Hindi and English on Sikh religion, history, philosophy and ethics. The organisation states that its publications are intended to make Sikh religious education available to a wider readership.

== Sikh Missionary Colleges network ==
In addition to its main centre at Ludhiana, Sikh Missionary College has associated full-time Sikh Missionary Colleges at:

- Kurukshetra, Haryana
- Anandpur Sahib, Punjab
- Bareilly, Uttar Pradesh

These colleges provide courses related to Gurmat, Sikh scriptures, Sikh theology, history and philosophy. The courses are intended to train students for Sikh religious and educational service.

Giani Kuldeep Singh Gargaj has been reported to have studied Sikh Studies at Sikh Missionary College, Ludhiana. Gargaj later became acting Jathedar of the Akal Takht and also serves as Jathedar of Takht Sri Kesgarh Sahib at Anandpur Sahib, Punjab.

== Dharmik Parikhya ==
Sikh Missionary College conducts a Dharmik Parikhya, or religious examination, for students. The examination is intended to encourage the study of Sikh history, Sikh teachings and Sikh culture among young people.

== Role and activities ==
Sikh Missionary College is active in Sikh religious education through publications, correspondence courses, study circles and religious examinations. Its work is mainly connected with the study and teaching of Sikh scripture, history and Gurmat.

== Notable people ==
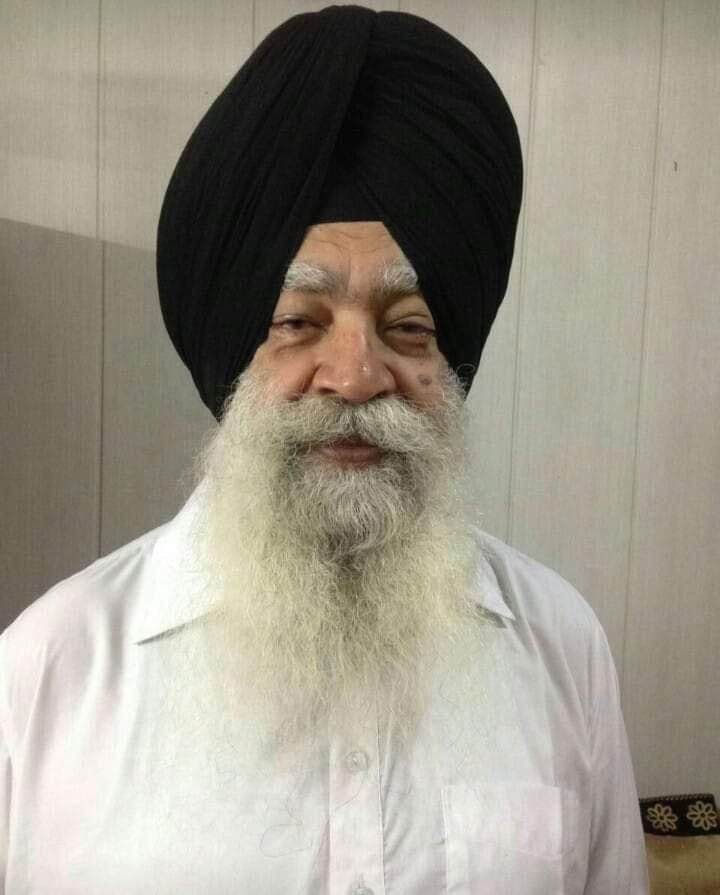
Harbhajan Singh

- Harbhajan Singh – founding president of Sikh Missionary College, Ludhiana. According to the college's official website, a Supreme Council of nine founder members was formed when the organisation was established, and S. Harbhajan Singh of Ludhiana was appointed president.
- Harjit Singh – chairman of Sikh Missionary College, Ludhiana. In 2021, Dainik Jagran described him as the newly appointed chairman of Sikh Missionary College in a report about a felicitation ceremony. In 2025, Punjab Infoline also identified S. Harjit Singh as chairman of Sikh Missionary College, Ludhiana, in relation to the college's two-year correspondence course and its monthly magazine Sikh Phulwari.

== See also ==
- Shiromani Gurdwara Parbandhak Committee
- Guru Granth Sahib
- Sikhism
