= Sarbat Khalsa (2015) =

Deliberative assembly of Sikhs

The Sarbat Khalsa of 2015 was held on November 10, 2015, in Chabba village on the outskirts of Amritsar, with the purpose to strengthen all Sikh institutions and traditions. As many as 550,000 to over 600,000 Sikhs from around the world attended the event. A few Sikh organizations in support of the Shiromani Akali Dal did not attend the event and refused to recognize the resolutions passed. The event was also opposed by Punjab Chief Minister Parkash Singh Badal and his party Akali Dal]. But Few Sikh organizations supported to Sarbat Khalsa attended the event and recognized the resolutions passed. The event was called by Simranjit Singh Mann and Mohkam Singh, leaders of Shiromani Akali Dal (Amritsar) and United Akali Dal respectively. The Sikh congregation passed 13 resolutions to be implemented.

== See also ==
- Sarv Khap system of Haryana and Uttar Pradesh is similar to Sarbat Khalsa
- Jathedar of Akal Takht
- Gurmata, a term used to refer to resolutions passed by the Sarbat Khalsa
- Hukamnama, an injunction or edict issued by the Sikh gurus, their officiated followers, the Takhts, or taken from the Guru Granth Sahib
- Rakhi system, the protection tax implemented by the Sikh Confederacy
- Sarbat Khalsa
