= Akali Santa Singh =

Indian Sikh leader (1928–2008)

Jathedar Akali Santa Singh
- ਅਕਾਲੀ ਸੰਤਾ ਸਿੰਘ

13th Jathedar of Buddha Dal
- In office 1968–2008
- Preceded by: Akali Chet Singh
- Succeeded by: Akali Surjit Singh (Disputed with Baba Balbir Singh)

Personal details
- Born: Pashaura Singh; 1928 Gujranwala, Punjab
- Died: 8 May 2008 (age 80)
- Known for: 13th Jathedar of Buddha Dal

Pashaura Singh (1928–2008) also known as Santa Singh or to Nihang Sikhs as Jathedar Akali Baba Santa Singh Ji Nihang 96 Crori was the 13th Jathedar of Budha Dal, succeeding Akali Chet Singh.

== Early life ==
He was born as Pashaura Singh in Gujranwala.

== Religious career ==
=== Sarbloh Granth ===
The Sarbloh Granth was first published in the mid-20th century by Santa Singh. He had major influence over bringing its teachings to the wider Sikh community.

=== Reconciliation with the Sikh community ===
In 2001, Santa Singh accepted the “tankhah” (punishment for religious misconduct) pronounced by Giani Joginder Singh Vedanti, the Jathedar of the Akal Takht.

Also in the same year, the followers of Santa Singh have said he had made the choice to reintegrate himself with the Sikh Panth. They asserted that his decision would serve as a source of motivation for Sikhs. Udhe Singh (Secretary of Budha Dal and nephew of Baba Santa Singh), Maharaj Singh, Partap Singh, Prithipal Singh, the personal assistant to Jathedar Vedanti, played pivotal roles in facilitating Santa Singh's reconnection with the Sikh community.

== Differences in Sikh religious, social and political views ==
=== Political views ===
Santa Singh was an avid supporter of Indian National Congress and was close to many leaders. He had been dubbed by many Sikhs as a "government stooge".

In the early 70s Santa Singh became close with India's President Zail Singh. Zail Singh even gifted Santa Singh a car. After this Santa and fellow Nihangs regularly attended Congress rallies and blessed Indira Gandhi before her elections.

In the aftermath of Operation Blue Star he attended a Congress rally organised by Indira Gandhi. This led to heavy criticism by Sikh leaders.

Santa Singh was said to be close with Home Minister and Congress leader Buta Singh.

=== Bhang consumption issue ===
In 2001, Santa Singh along with 20 chiefs of Nihang sects, refused to accept the ban on consumption of bhang by the Shiromani Gurdwara Parbandhak Committee. However, there exists a tradition of Nihang Sikhs using edible cannabis, often in the form of the beverage bhang.

=== Akal Takht reconstruction ===
Santa Singh rebuilt the Akal Takht after its damage during Operation Blue Star in 1984. The construction work was done by paid workers. This caused controversy with Damdami Taksal, Shiromani Gurdwara Parbandhak Committee and many members of the wider Sikh community.

As a result, Baba Santa Singh was excommunicated by SGPC.Later, Santa Singh was also excommunicated and was stripped of Jathedari of Budha Dal during the 1986 Sarbat Khalsa, where they also recognized Amrik Singh Jaura as his replacement. The Akal Takht was also renovated during this period to remove the building constructed by the government. Baba Thakur Singh Bhindranwale is said to be responsible for this.

=== Views on Sikh separatism ===
When asked about Khalistan, Santa Singh said, "Isn't the President of India a Sikh? There are so many ministers, generals, officers. There is no discrimination. And in which little district will they make their Khalistan?"

When asked to comment about the Akali Dal claiming they did not oppose Jarnail Singh Bhindranwale out of fear Santa Singh said, "Why did they never approach me for help? I would have happily sent in my cavalry. What are all these gallant horsemen for if not for saving the shrines from desecration? It is because they did not ask their own Sikh armies that Mrs. Gandhi had to send in hers"

=== SGPC ===
When asked about why he is upset with the SGPC Santa Singh said, "They have been messing about for 60 years. They just make a commotion. I call them Khappoo Singhs (Khap means noise in Punjabi). Their movement has failed and now they are running marches, hiding behind women and children. Why didn't they act when Bhindranwale's men were going about defecating and drying underwear on the balconies of the Akal Takht?"

In 2012, SGPC reversed its initial decision to install Santa Singh portrait in the Central Sikh Museum due to backlash from certain fractions of the community.
