= Dhian Singh Mand =

Sikh politician

Acting Jathedar of the Akal Takht (Note: Appointed by Sarbat Khalsa in 2015. Disputed by SGPC.) (Disputed)
- Incumbent
- Assumed office 10 November 2015 (Note: Disputed with Gurbachan Singh until 18 October 2018, Harpreet Singh from 22 October 2018 to 16 June 2023, Raghbir Singh from 22 June 2023 to 7 March 2025, Kuldeep Singh Gagraj since 8 March 2025)
- Appointed by: Sarbat Khalsa
- Preceded by: Gurbachan Singh

Member of Parliament, Lok Sabha
- In office 2 December 1989 – 13 March 1991
- Preceded by: Gurdial Singh Dhillon
- Succeeded by: Mohan Singh
- Constituency: Firozpur

Personal details
- Born: Dhian Singh Mand; 3 May 1961 (age 65) Sedia Ka Ruhila, Ferozepur, Punjab
- Party: Shiromani Akali Dal (Amritsar)
- Parent: Ajaib Singh Mand (father)
- Education: Government High School, Noorpur Sethiean

Dhian Singh Mand (born 3 May 1961) is a Sikh politician who has been serving as the Sarbat Khalsa-appointed acting jathedar of the Akal Takht since 2015 due to the imprisonment of its permanent jathedar Jagtar Singh Hawara.

== Early life ==
Dhian Singh Mand was born on 3 May 1961 in Sedia Ka Ruhila, Firozpur, Punjab, India. He is the son of Ajaib Singh Mand and completed his matriculation at Government High School, Noorpur Sethiean.

== Political career ==
In 1989, Dhian Singh Mand achieved a surprising victory by over 200,000 votes in the Firozepur constituency during the Indian general elections. Mand, who was relatively unknown at the time, defeated prominent figures such as Congress leader Jagmeet Singh Brar and Janata Dal leader Devi Lal. His success was attributed to endorsement from the Shiromani Akali Dal (Amritsar), as well as the influence of the martyrdom of three of his brothers in police encounters.
