= Partap Singh =

Sikh leader and author

Giani Partap Singh
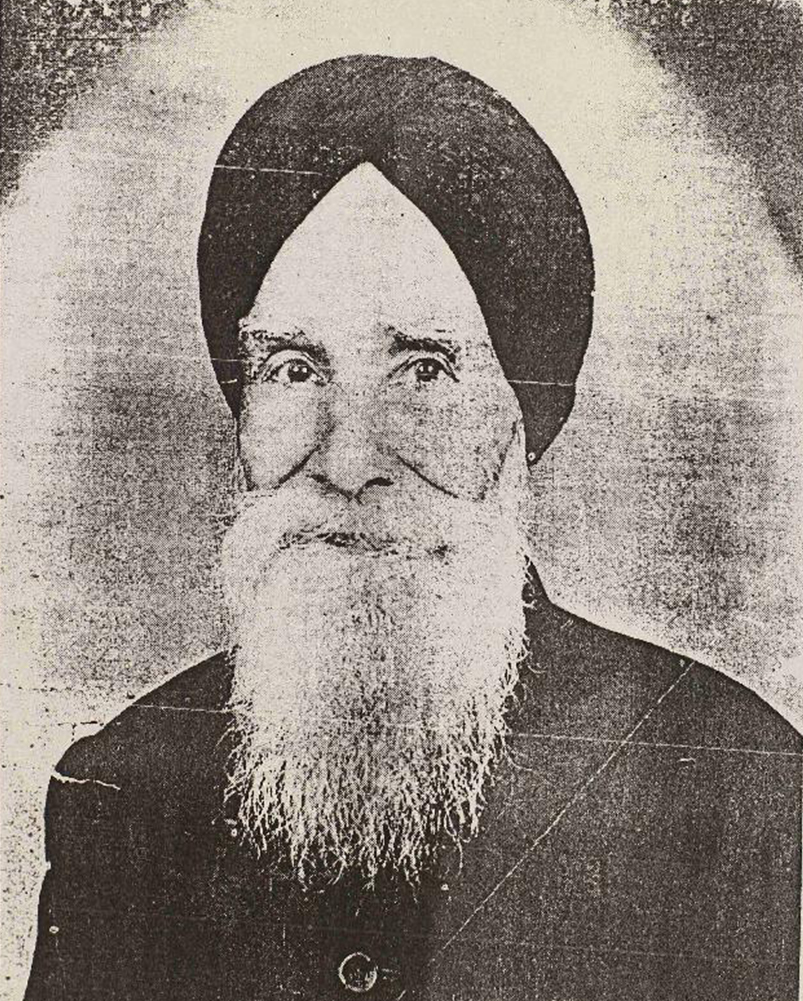

Jathedar of the Akal Takht
- In office 1952 – 15 February 1955
- Appointed by: Shiromani Gurdwara Parbandhak Committee
- Preceded by: Mohan Singh Nagoke
- Succeeded by: Acchar Singh

Jathedar of Kesgarh Sahib
- In office 1948–1952
- Appointed by: Shiromani Gurdwara Parbandhak Committee

Acting Jathedar of the Akal Takht
- In office 19 December 1937 – 1948
- Appointed by: Shiromani Gurdwara Parbandhak Committee
- Succeeded by: Kirpal Singh

Personal details
- Born: Partap Singh; 3 January 1904 Nara, Rawalpindi, Panjab, British India (present day Pakistan)
- Died: 10 May 1984 (aged 80) Amritsar, Panjab, India
- Spouse: Shaant Kaur
- Children: 6
- Parents: Makhan Singh (father); Mathura Devi (mother)
- Education: Khalsa Updesh College, Gujranwala

Partap Singh (3 January 1904 – 10 May 1984) was a Sikh priest and Panjabi writer. He served as the first acting Jathedar of Akal Takht from 19 December 1937 to 1948 and 19th Jathedar of Akal Takht from 1952 to 15 February 1955.

== Early life and career ==
Partap Singh was born on 3 January 1904, at Nara village in Rawalpindi division of Panjab, British India. His father was Makhan Singh Sasan and mother Mathura Devi. His grandfather, Sundar Singh served in the army of Maharaja Ranjit Singh. Between 1909 and 1918, Singh completed 5 years of education at the local primary school in Nara and further education at the middle school in Bishan Daur. Near the completion of his primary education, he took the vows of the Khalsa and became an initiated Sikh. Subsequently, for some 3 years he studied Sikh literature and attended the services of Singh Sabha Movement and Isher Singh Rara Sahib.

In 1922, Singh enrolled into Khalsa Updesh College at Gujranwala, where he passed the certificate of Giani with the second highest marks in Panjab. From 1918 to 1921, he attended various conferences organised by Chief Khalsa Diwan, Na-Milvartan Lehir and Sikh League. These conferences had a great impact on his mind and conscience.

In 1923, Singh contributed with immense participation in the Kar Seva (literally "service with hands") of Harmandir Sahib. Considering the service and education of the Giani, Shiromani Gurdwara Parbandhak Committee (SGPC) employed him as a priest. Soon after he joined, the East India Company declared that the SGPC was against the law. The government arrested various SGPC workers including Singh and imprisoned them at Jhang and Multan. During the one and half years of imprisonment, the Giani managed to learn multiple languages such as English, Urdu, Persian and Hindi.

== Works ==
- Zaat Paat te Chhoot Chhaat (Punjabi: ਜ਼ਾਤ ਪਾਤ ਤੇ ਛੂਤ ਛਾਤ), 1933
- Gurmat Lecture (Punjabi: ਗੁਰਮਤਿ ਲੈਕਚਰ), 1944
- Itihasic Lecture Do Bhaag (Punjabi: ਇਤਿਹਾਸਕ ਲੈਕਚਰ ਦੋ ਭਾਗ), 1945
- Sadha Desh Te Usdian Smasiawan (Punjabi: ਸਾਡਾ ਦੇਸ਼ ਤੇ ਉਸਦੀਆਂ ਸਮਸਿਆਵਾਂ), 1945
- Bhagat Darshan (Punjabi: ਭਗਤ ਦਰਸ਼ਨ), 1945
- Gurmat Philosophy (Punjabi: ਗੁਰਮਤਿ ਫਿਲਾਸਫੀ), 1946
- Sansaar Da Dharmic Itihas (Punjabi: ਸੰਸਾਰ ਦਾ ਧਾਰਮਿਕ ਇਤਿਹਾਸ), 1948
- Kudrat De Chamatkaar (Punjabi: ਕੁਦਰਤ ਦੇ ਚਮਤਕਾਰ), 1947
- Pakistani Ghalughara (Punjabi: ਪਾਕਿਸਤਾਨੀ ਘਲੂਘਾਰਾ), 1948
- Akali Lahir Da Ithas (Punjabi: ਅਕਾਲੀ ਲਹਿਰ ਦਾ ਇਤਿਹਾਸ), 1951
- Baba Khuda Singh (Punjabi: ਬਾਬਾ ਖੁਦਾ ਸਿੰਘ), 1962
- Baba Bir Singh Naurangabad (Punjabi: ਬਾਬਾ ਬੀਰ ਸਿੰਘ ਨੌਰੰਗਾਬਾਦ), 1962
- Takhtan Bare Vichar (Punjabi: ਤਖਤਾਂ ਬਾਰੇ ਵਿਚਾਰ), 1966
- Nakli Nirankari (Punjabi: ਨਕਲੀ ਨਿਰੰਕਾਰੀ), 1967
- Shaheed Darshan Singh Pheruma (Punjabi: ਸ਼ਹੀਦ ਸ:ਦਰਸ਼ਨ ਸਿੰਘ ਫੇਰੂਮਾਨ), 1968
- Radha Swami Mat Darpan (Punjabi: ਰਾਧਾ ਸਵਾਮੀ ਮਤ ਦਰਪਨ), 1969
- Gurbani Es Jag Meh Chanan (Punjabi: ਗੁਰਬਾਣੀ ਇਸ ਜਗ ਮਹਿ ਚਾਨਣ), 1975
- Kuka Guru Dum (Punjabi: ਕੂਕਾ ਗੁਰੂ ਡਮ), 1972
- Mahabali Guru Gobind Singh (Punjabi: ਮਹਾਬਲੀ ਗੁਰੂ ਗੋਬਿੰਦ ਸਿੰਘ), 1974
- Hind Di Chadar Guru Tegh Bahadar (Punjabi: ਹਿੰਦ ਦੀ ਚਾਦਰ ਗੁਰੂ ਤੇਗ ਬਹਾਦਰ), 1975
- Akali Lahir De Mahaan Neta (Punjabi: ਅਕਾਲੀ ਲਹਿਰ ਦੇ ਮਹਾਨ ਨੇਤਾ), 1976
- Amritsar Sifti Da Ghar (Punjabi: ਅਮ੍ਰਿਤਸਰ ਸਿਫਤੀ ਦਾ ਘਰ), 1977

== Jathedar of Akal Takht ==
The inauguration of Singh as the first vice Jathedar of Akal Takht took place on 19 December 1937. He served alongside Mohan Singh Nagoke up to 1948 and later served as the Jathedar of Akal Takht from 1952 to 15 February 1955. He resign due to political difference with Master Tara Singh.

== Family and personal life ==
In 1918, Singh married Shaant Kaur, daughter of Mangal Singh. The couple had six children.

== Death ==
According to a report by The Times of India, former Giani Partap Singh, who served as Jathedar of the Akal Takht from 1952 to 1954, was gunned down by terrorists in 1984. No one was identified. His death while reporting on a later incident in which gunmen fired at his house in Kot Atma Ram, Sultanwind Road, Amritsar. It notes his earlier service as Assistant Jathedar (1938–1948) and confirms that he was killed in 1984 during the period of violence in Punjab. As per one claim, he was assassinated by Jarnail Singh Bhindranwale's companion Daya Singh in Amritsar, Punjab, India for criticising the occupation of the Akal Takht of the Golden temple by Bhindranwale and his corhorts. He described this occupation as sacrilegious to the Sikh faith.
