= Jagtar Singh Hawara =

Jailed Jathedar of Akal Takht

- Born: Jagtar Singh; May 16, 1973 (age 53); Hawara,Khamano,Fatehghar Sahib
- Citizenship: Indian
- Organization: Babbar Khalsa
- Known for: Assassination of Beant Singh, 12th Chief Minister of Punjab; 2004 Burail jailbreak Being declared Jathedar of the Akal Takht by a Sarbat Khalsa
- Title: Jathedar Akal Takhat
- Movement: Dharam Yudh Morcha
- Parent(s): Father Sher Singh,Mother Narinder Kaur,Brother Avtar Singh
- Status: Imprisoned
- Conviction: Assassination (2007)
- Criminal charge: Assassination (murder)
- Penalty: Life imprisonment
- Capture status: Arrested (Case CM Beant Singh)
- Accomplices: Balwant Singh Rajoana; Dilawar Singh Babbar
- Escaped: 2004
- Escape end: 2005
- Comments: Recaptured in Delhi

Details
- Victims: Beant Singh and 16 others
- Date: 31 August 1995
- Imprisoned at: Tihar Jail,New Delhi, India 2019

Jagtar Singh Hawara is a high level member of Babbar Khalsa who is currently serving life imprisonment at Tihar Jail. He was convicted as a conspirator in the assassination of 12th Chief Minister of Punjab, Beant Singh.

Hawara was declared as the Jathedar of the Akal Takht by a Sarbat Khalsa organised at village of Chabba on the outskirts of Amritsar, however this declaration is disputed and unrecognised by the Shiromani Gurdwara Parbandhak Committee (SGPC).

== Criminal record ==
=== Murder accusations ===
In 1988 Hawara was accused murdering the granthi of a Gurdwara in Chamkaur Sahib. He would be acquitted on the charge.

He also was accused of killing special police officer Sunil Kumar at Shaheedi Jor Mela at Chamkaur Sahib on 21 December 1992. However he was acquitted of the charge in February 2017.

=== Assassination of 12th Chief Minister of Punjab ===
Hawara was charged in the assassination of 12th Chief Minister of Punjab, Beant Singh. On 31 August 1995, Dilawar Singh Babbar, a human bomb assassinated Beant Singh by blowing up his bullet-proof car at the Punjab and Haryana Civil Secretariat, Chandigarh. Seventeen people were killed and fifteen others injured.

In 2007, he was convicted was given death penalty after a trial in Chandigarh court. Hawara appealed to the Punjab and Haryana High Court, which in October 2010 converted his death penalty to life imprisonment. Hawara further appealed the case in the Supreme Court of India, where it is currently pending.

=== 2004 Burail jailbreak ===
In 2004, Hawara came back into the limelight when he escaped from maximum security jail at Burail, along with two other Sikh prisoners by digging a 90 feet tunnel with his bare hands. He was recaptured in 2005 from Delhi. He is imprisoned at Tihar Jail, New Delhi.

== Declared Jathedar by 2015 Sarbat Khalsa ==
On 10 November 2015, Jagtar Singh Hawara was declared to be replacing Gurbachan Singh as the interim Jathedar of Akal Takht by a Sarbat Khalsa organised at Chabba village on the outskirts of Amritsar, Punjab by Sikh organisations. It also declared Dhian Singh Mand as an interim Jathedar of Akal Takht. It demanded all the current Jathedars including Gurbachan Singh be removed. The SGPC president at that time, Avtar Singh Makkar, however condemned the convening as against the principles of Sikhism and its decisions were null and void. He added that the removal of Jathedar came under Sikh Gurdwaras Act, 1925 and no one could challenge the SGPC's authority.
