= Gurmata =

Sikh religious injunction

A Gurmata (Punjabi: ਗੁਰਮਤਾ; literally, 'Guru's intention' or 'advice of the Guru'), alternatively romanized as Gurumatta, is an order upon a subject that affects the fundamental principles of Sikh religion and is binding upon all Sikhs. The prefix gur- signals the agreement from the Guru and the suffix -mata means a resolution by the people on legal matter.

== Role ==
Gurmata is similar to Fatwa in the Muslim tradition with a difference that Fatwa is not binding on all Muslims while Gurmata is binding on all Khalsa, however it is not binding on non-Khalsa Sikhs.

== History ==
Gurmatas were used in the 18th century to refer to the resolutions passed by the Sarbat Khalsa, a large gathering of esteemed Sikhs. In the 18th century, gurmatas were issued during Baisakhi and Diwali gatherings. Most of the gurmatas were issued from Amritsar for logistical reasons since the Sikh would gather at the city for the aforementioned celebrations.

=== Significant Gurmatas ===
Date	Significance
1708	Panj Piare quintet issue gurmatta injunction against Guru Gobind Singh to pay 125 rupees for tilting an arrow in the direction of the shrine of Dadu Dayal in Naraina, Rajasthan as a mark of reverence, which was a test by the guru to see if his Sikhs understood that reverence of mausoleums are to be rejected. Guru Gobind Singh, pleased with the Sikhs for recognizing the perceived transgression, paid the injunction fee.
Vaisakhi 1721	Tat Khalsa and Bandai Khalsa settle their differences.
1726	Sarbat Khalsa passes Gurmata to raid Mughal precious metal transports, confiscate Mughal armories, and eliminate Mughal informers
1733	Sarbat Khalsa accepts jagir given by Mughal government
14 October 1745	During Diwali, the Sarbat Khalsa passes Gurmata organizing Khalsa into 25 jathas
Vaisakhi 1747	Construction of the fortress of Ram Rauni in Amritsar
29 March 1748	Sarbat Khalsa passes Gurmata reorganizing sixty-five jathas into 11 misls with Jassa Singh Ahluwalia as supreme commander. The records of all territories of the individual misls were ordered to be kept at the Akal Takht in Amritsar.
1753	Official establishment of the Rakhi system
7 November 1760	Sarbat Khalsa passes Gurmata to attack Lahore
27 October 1761	Gurmata passed during the annual Diwali meeting at Amritsar that supporters, such as agents, informers and collaborators, of the Durrani Empire must be annihilated. The first target chosen was Aqil Das, then-head of the heretical Hindali sect and colluder of Ahmad Shah Abdali. Also decided in this Gurmata was that Sikhs should take control of Lahore.
1805	Pursuance of the Maratha leader Yashwantrao Holkar by the British military in the Punjab
1920	Teja Singh Bhuchhar was announced as the Jathedar of the Akal Takht
26 January 1986	Sarbat Khalsa elects and inaugurates 5 member panthik committee to make decisions on behalf of the Sikh diaspora.
16 February 1986	Sarbat Khalsa was held at Anandpur Sahib (City of Bliss). Sarbat Khalsa unified the panth.
10 November 2015	Sarbat Khalsa was held at Chabba Village, where Jagtar Singh Hawara was appointed new Jathedar of Akal Takht.

== See also ==
- Hukamnama, an injunction or edict issued by the Sikh gurus, their officiated followers, the Takhts, or taken from the Guru Granth Sahib
- Rakhi system, the protection tax implemented by the Sikh Confederacy
- Sarbat Khalsa
