= Jathedar of the Akal Takht =

Head of the Akal Takht and head of the Sikhs

- ਜੱਥੇਦਾਰ ਅਕਾਲ ਤਖ਼ਤ ਸਾਹਿਬ
- Seal of the Akal Takht

- Flag of the Akal Takht

- Incumbent; Disputed between Kuldeep Singh Gargaj (Note: The SGPC refused to recognise the authority of the 2015 Sarbat Khalsa. Kuldeep Singh Gargaj has served as the jathedar of SGPC since 2025.) (pictured); Dhian Singh Mand (Note: Jagtar Singh Hawara was appointed by the Sarbat Khalsa on 10 November 2015. However due to his imprisonment, Dhian Singh Mand was appointed as the acting jathedar in his stead. The SGPC however refused to recognise its decisions.) since 10 November 2015 and 7 March 2025 respectively
- Style: The Honourable; Singh Sahib
- Member of: Khalsa
- Seat: Akal Takht
- Appointer: Sarbat Khalsa or SGPC
- Term length: No term limit
- Formation: 15 June 1606 (420 years ago)
- First holder: Bhai Gurdas
- Website: SGPC

The Jathedar of the Akal Takht (Punjabi: ਜੱਥੇਦਾਰ ਅਕਾਲ ਤਖ਼ਤ ਸਾਹਿਬ) is the head of the Akal Takht and head of the Sikhs worldwide. The jathedar has the de facto power as the supreme spokesperson of the Khalsa to summon, try and sentence any person who identifies as a Sikh from the Akal Takht.

The current jathedar, Kuldeep Singh Gargaj, was appointed by the Shiromani Gurdwara Parbandhak Committee (SGPC) on 7 March 2025. Jagtar Singh Hawara, was declared jathedar of the Akal Takht by the Sarbat Khalsa on 10 November 2015, But due to the imprisonment of Hawara, Dhian Singh Mand, appointed by the Sarbat Khalsa, has been serving as the acting jathedar. The jathedars of the five takhts generally make important decisions in consultation within the framework of the Sikh Rehat Maryada while considering the collective will of the Sikhs.

The position of jathedar is not established by any constitutional document, but exists only by long-established convention, whereby a Sarbat Khalsa or an institution authorised by it appoints a person most likely to command the confidence of the Sikhs. The jathedar is supported by the Shiromani Gurdwara Parbandhak Committee and heads the other four jathedars of the takhts. The jathedar also commands the Akali Nihangs, an armed Sikh warrior order started from the Akal Takht by the sixth Sikh Guru, Guru Hargobind.

The Akal Takht, the building directly opposite the Darbar Sahib, was founded by Guru Hargobind, as a symbol of political sovereignty and where spiritual and temporal concerns of the Sikh people can be addressed. Along with Baba Buddha and Bhai Gurdas, the sixth Guru built a concrete slab. When Guru Hargobind revealed the platform on 15 June 1606, he put on two swords: one indicated his spiritual authority (piri) and the other, his temporal authority (miri).

== History and development ==
=== Title and etymology ===
The word jathedar is a compound of ਜੱਥਾ, jathā, 'troop' and ਦਾਰ, dār, 'keeper of', meaning leader of a troop or group as a collective. The title is used for a general or commander of a Sikh military unit and applies to a head of a takht.

=== Origin ===
After the execution of the fifth Guru, Guru Arjan, his son and successor Guru Hargobind bearing the two swords of ਮੀਰੀ, mīrī, 'politics' and ਪੀਰੀ, pīrī, 'spirituality' declared himself sovereign and defied the imperial edict of the Mugal Empire in 1606. Recognising the necessity of coordinating efforts against the Mughal empire, the Guru simultaneously began the process of militarising the Sikhs. The first hukamnama issued from the Akal Takht on 30 June 1606 commanded the Sikhs to offer arms and horses. The position of jathedar was established, when the Guru appointed Bhai Gurdas as the first custodian of the Akal Takht, which was then known as the Akal Bunga. However, Guru Hargobind had to leave the Akal Takht in 1634 due to the hostilities of the Mughal rulers, and the institution came under the control of the Minas, followers of Prithi Chand, the excommunicated brother Guru Arjan.

Following the establishment of the Khalsa, which took effect on 13 April 1699, the tenth Guru, Guru Gobind Singh sent Bhai Mani Singh to Amritsar with instructions to take possession of the Darbar Sahib and the Akal Takht from the Minas. The Sikhs assigned Bhai Mani Singh as the head granthi of Harmandir Sahib and the jathedar of the Akal Takht. After the passing of Guru Gobind Singh, the Sikh divisions accepted the common leadership and sovereignty of the head of the Akal Takht.

=== Sarbat Khalsa ===
In 1733, Zakariya Khan Bahadur attempted to negotiate truce with the Sikhs by offering them a jagir, the title Nawab to their head, and unimpeded access to Amritsar. After discussion at a Sarbat Khalsa, Kapur Singh Virk was chosen head of the Sikhs and took the title of Nawab. He combined the various Sikh militias into two groups; Taruna Dal for under 40 years of age and the Buddha Dal for over 40 years of age, which would collectively be known as Dal Khalsa. The Taruna Dal was further divided in five jathas, each with 1300 to 2000 men and a separate drum and banner. Considering Hari ke Pattan, where the Sutlej and Beas rivers meet as a reference point, the Taruna Dal was assigned to control the eastern area while the Buddha Dal controlled the west.

On 23 March 1748, a Sarbat Khalsa appointed Jassa Singh Ahluwalia to take the command of Dal Khalsa and become the head of the Sikhs. Ahluwalia proclaimed the title of Sultan-ul-Qaum (Authority of the Nation) when the Sikhs under his leadership defeated the Afghan forces of Ahmad Shah Abdali and took Lahore without resistance in September 1761. The 40,000 allied forces of Baghel Singh, Jassa Singh Ahluwalia and Jassa Singh Ramgarhia conquered the Red Fort in Delhi and hoisted the Nishan Sahib atop on 11 March 1783. The condition of their retreat included the construction of seven gurdwaras marking Sikh historical sites in Delhi.

=== Dispute ===
A Sarbat Khalsa convened by Sikh organisations opposed to the influence of Shiromani Akali Dal over Sikh religious institutions in 2015 appointed Jagtar Singh Hawara as the Jathedar of Akal Takht. The SGPC president at that time, Avtar Singh Makkar, however condemned the convening as against the principles of Sikhism and its decisions null and void. He added that the removal of Jathedars came under Sikh Gurdwaras Act, 1925 and no one could challenge the authority of the SGPC. Giani Gurbachan Singh continued to remain in his post until his resignation on 18 October 2018. On 23 October, the SGPC appointed Giani Harpreet Singh as the acting jathedar of Akal Takht.

== Qualifications and selection ==
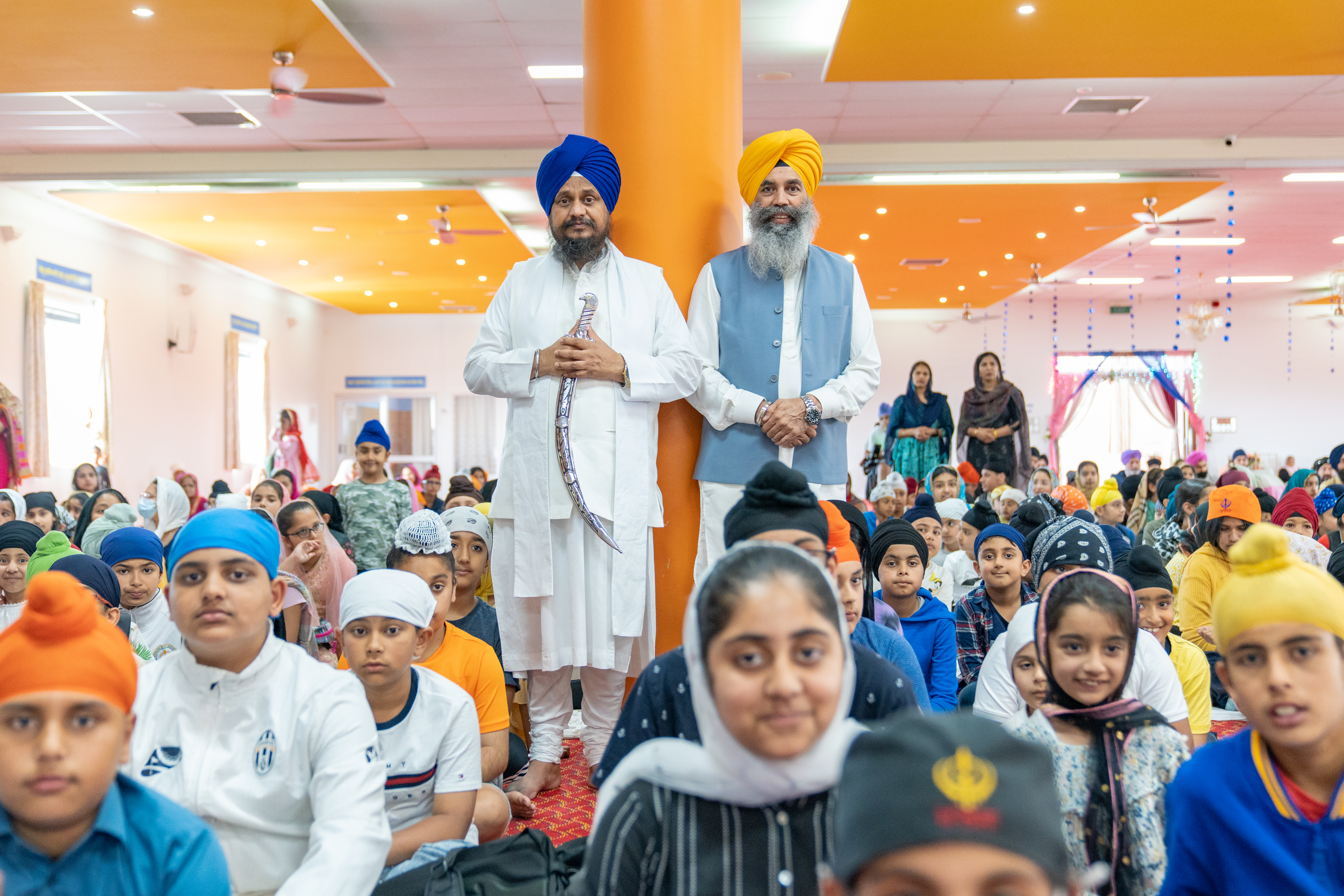
Jathedar Harpreet Singh surrounded by Sikh children at Takanini Gurdwara in New Zealand.

The jathedar serves at the Khalsa's pleasure, meaning the post does not have a fixed term, and once appointed, the jathedar remains in service until they resign, are dismissed, or die.

Chapter IV, Article V of the Sikh Rehat Maryada only permits an initiated Sikh to enter the hallowed enclosures of a takht; therefore, only a Khalsa Sikh of high regard can become a jathedar. Prior to 1921, jathedars were appointed by the Sarbat Khalsa, a biannual deliberative assembly of the Sikhs held at Amritsar. Since 1921, the jathedar of takhts have generally been appointed by the Shiromani Gurdwara Parbandhak Committee.

== Role and authority ==
Chapter XIII, Article XXVII of the Sikh Rehat Maryada allows for an appeal against a local decision concerning the Sikhs to be made to the Akal Takht. The jathedar of the Akal Takht has the de facto power to summoned Sikhs including those who hold a position of authority to be trialed. Hukamnamas issued by the jathedar from the Akal Takht which are binding may order an acquittal, penalty or excommunication. The Khalsa can hold individuals accountable for violating the decisions of the Akal Takht.

== List ==
Colour key

Guru
Sarbat Khalsa
Buddha Dal
SGPC

List of jathedars of the Akal Takht from 1618 – present.
No.	Portrait	Name (Birth–Death)	Term			Assigned by	Ref.
No.	Portrait	Name (Birth–Death)	Start	End	Duration	Assigned by	Ref.
1		Gurdas Bhalla (1551–1637)	1606	1637^{[ੴ]}	31 years	Guru Hargobind	
Usurped by Mina leaders Harji and his sons from 1640 to 1698.
2		Mani Singh (1644–1737)	1699	1737^{[ੴ]}	38 years	Guru Gobind Singh	
3		Darbara Singh (1644–1734)	1722	1734^{[ੴ]}	12 years	Sarbat Khalsa	
4		Kapur Singh (1697–1753)	1737	29 March 1748	14 years	Sarbat Khalsa	
5		Jassa Singh Ahluwalia (1718–1783)	29 March 1748	23 October 1783	35 years, 208 days	Sarbat Khalsa	
6		Phula Singh (1761–1823)	1800	1823^{[ੴ]}	23 years	Sarbat Khalsa	
7		Hanuman Singh (1755–1846)	1823	1846^{[ੴ]}	23 years	Buddha Dal	
8		Prahlad Singh (death 1865)	1846	1865^{[ੴ]}	19 years	Buddha Dal	
Usurped by Sarbarahs appointed by the British Indian Government from 1859 to 1920: Jodh Singh (1859–1862), Mangal Singh Ramgarhia (1862–1879), Man Singh Waraich (1879–1890), Arjan Singh Chahal (1890–1896), Jawala Singh (1896–1902) and Arur Singh Shergill (1902–1920).
9		Teja Singh Bhuchar (1887-1939)	12 October 1920	29 April 1921	199 days	Sarbat Khalsa	
10 1 of 2		Teja Singh Akarpuri (1892-1975)	29 April 1921	13 October 1923	2 years, 167 days	SGPC	
11 1 of 2		Udham Singh Nagoke (1894-1966)	13 October 1923	9 February 1924	119 days	SGPC	
12 1 of 2		Acchar Singh (1893-1976)	09 February 1924	10 January 1926	1 year, 335 days	SGPC	
— 2 of 2		Udham Singh Nagoke (1894-1966)	10 January 1926	short period	Less than a year	SGPC	
— 2 of 2		Teja Singh Akarpuri (1892-1975)	27 November 1926	21 January 1930	3 years, 55 days	SGPC	
13		Didar Singh	1925	short period	Less than a year	SGPC	
14		Jawaher Singh Mattu Bhaike	1926	short period	Less than a year	SGPC	
15		Gurmukh Singh Musafir (1899-1976)	1931	1934	3 years	SGPC	
16		Vasakha Singh Dadehar (1877-1957)	October; 1934	December; 1934	61 days	SGPC	
17		Mohan Singh Nagoke (1898-1969)	1935	1952	17 years	SGPC	
18 1 of 2		Partap Singh (1904-1984); Acting	1938	1948	10 years	SGPC	
— 2 of 2		Partap Singh (1904-1984)	1952	1954^{[ੴ]}	2 years	SGPC	
— 2 of 2		Acchar Singh (1893-1976)	23 May 1955	08 November 1962	7 years, 169 days	SGPC	
19		Mohan Singh Tur (1916-1979)	1962	1963	1 year	SGPC	
20 1 of 2		Kirpal Singh (1918-1993); Acting	1963	1965	2 years	SGPC	
21		Sadhu Singh Bhaura (1905-1984)	1964	1980	16 years	SGPC	
22		Gurdial Singh Ajnoha (1927-1982)	2 March 1980	18 March 1982^{[ੴ]}	2 years, 16 days	SGPC	
— 2 of 2		Kirpal Singh (1918-1993)	1982	26 July 1986	4 years	SGPC	
23		Jasbir Singh Rode	26 January 1986	20 May 1988	2 years, 115 days	Sarbat Khalsa	
24		Gurdev Singh Kaunke (1949-1993); Acting	26 January 1986	1 January 1993^{[ੴ]}	6 years, 341 days	Sarbat Khalsa	
25		Gurbachan Singh Manochahal (1954-1993); Acting	27 April 1986	26 January 1987	274 days	Sarbat Khalsa	
26 1 of 2		Darshan Singh (born 1940); Acting	31 December 1986	9 March 1988	1 year, 69 days	SGPC	
— 2 of 2		Darshan Singh (born 1940)	1989	1990	1 year	SGPC	
27		Ranjit Singh (born 1955)	1994	March; 1999	5 years	SGPC	
28		Manjit Singh (born 1952); Acting	1994	1997	3 years	SGPC	
29 1 of 2		Puran Singh (death 2019); Acting	10 February 1999	April; 1999	50 days	SGPC	
— 2 of 2		Puran Singh (death 2019)	April; 1999	28 March 2000	362 days	SGPC	
30		Joginder Singh Vedanti (1940-2021)	28 March 2000	6 August 2008	8 years, 131 days	SGPC	
31		Gurbachan Singh (born 1948)	06 August 2008	18 October 2018	10 years, 73 days	SGPC	
32		Jagtar Singh Hawara (born 1973)	10 November 2015	Incumbent	10 years, 330 days	Sarbat Khalsa	
33		Dhian Singh Mand (born 1961); Acting	10 November 2015	Incumbent	10 years, 330 days	Sarbat Khalsa	
34		Harpreet Singh (born 1972); Acting	22 October 2018	16 June 2023	4 years, 238 days	SGPC	
35		Raghbir Singh (born 1970)	22 June 2023	7 March 2025	1 year, 258 days	SGPC	
36		Kuldeep Singh Gargaj (born 1985); Acting	7 March 2025	Incumbent	1 year, 213 days	SGPC	

- ^ੴ Died during term

== Timeline of jathedars ==
The following timeline depicts the progression of the jathedars.
