= Sarbat Khalsa =

Deliberative assembly of the Sikhs

Sarbat Khalsa ਸਰਬੱਤ ਖ਼ਾਲਸਾ

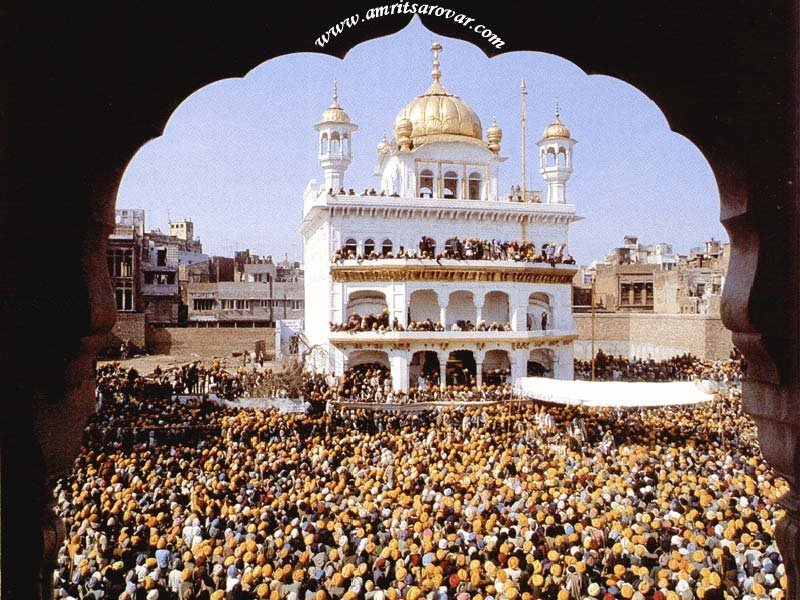
- The 1986 Sarbat Khalsa gathering at the Akal Takht on Vaisakhi (13 April 1986).
- Frequency: Biannually Since 1805, then called upon Sikh community request since 1986.
- Location: Various throughout Punjab Region
- Country: Previous (Sikh Raaj and Sikh Empire), Most recent (Punjab, India)
- Founded: 18th Century
- Founder: Guru Gobind Singh Ji
- Most recent: 10 November 2015
- Attendance: 500,000 - 600,000 Sikhs
- Major events: Sikh Religious Affairs, Sikh Activism, Sikh Human Rights, Sikh Separatism (Since 1986)

Sarbat Khalsa (lit. meaning all the Khalsa; Punjabi: ਸਰਬੱਤ ਖ਼ਾਲਸਾ (Gurmukhi) pronunciation: [sǝɾbǝt̪t̪ kʰäːlsäː]), was a biannual deliberative assembly (on the same lines as a Parliament in a Direct democracy) of the Sikhs held at Amritsar in Punjab during the 18th century. It literally translates to the "entire Sikh Nation" but as a political institution it refers to the meetings of the Dal Khalsa and the legislature of the Sikh Confederacy.

== Procedure ==
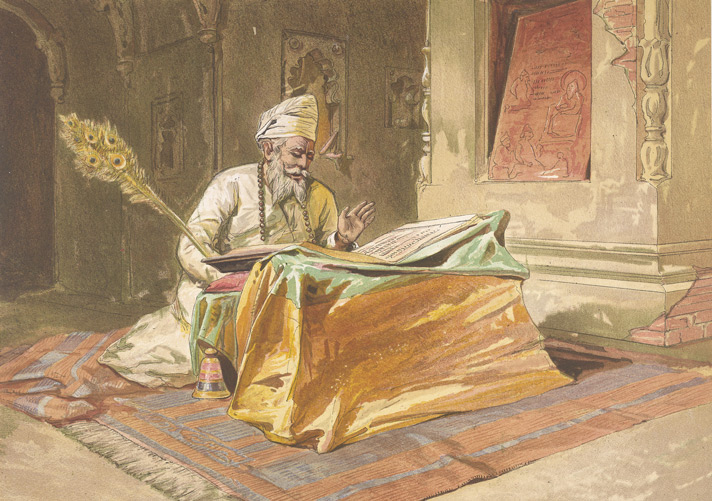
Meetings of the Sarbat Khalsa began with an Ardās, a Sikh prayer for guidance.

Meetings of the Sarbat Khalsa began with an Ardās, a Sikh prayer for guidance. The body then chose Panj Piare, or five members, to act as the governing body of the mass meeting. To become one of the Panj Piare members would have to be nominated, answer objections from the assembly, and be subject to a direct vote. After their election the Panj Piare sat next to the Guru Granth Sahib on the Akal Takht of Harmandir Sahib. Members put proposals up for consideration and the Panj Piare intervened in disputes that came up during the assembly. A proposal passed by the Sarbat Khalsa, known as a Gurmata (The Guru's decision) binding on all Sikhs. The declaration of the Independence of Khalistan was conducted in the Sarbat Khalsa (1986).

== History ==
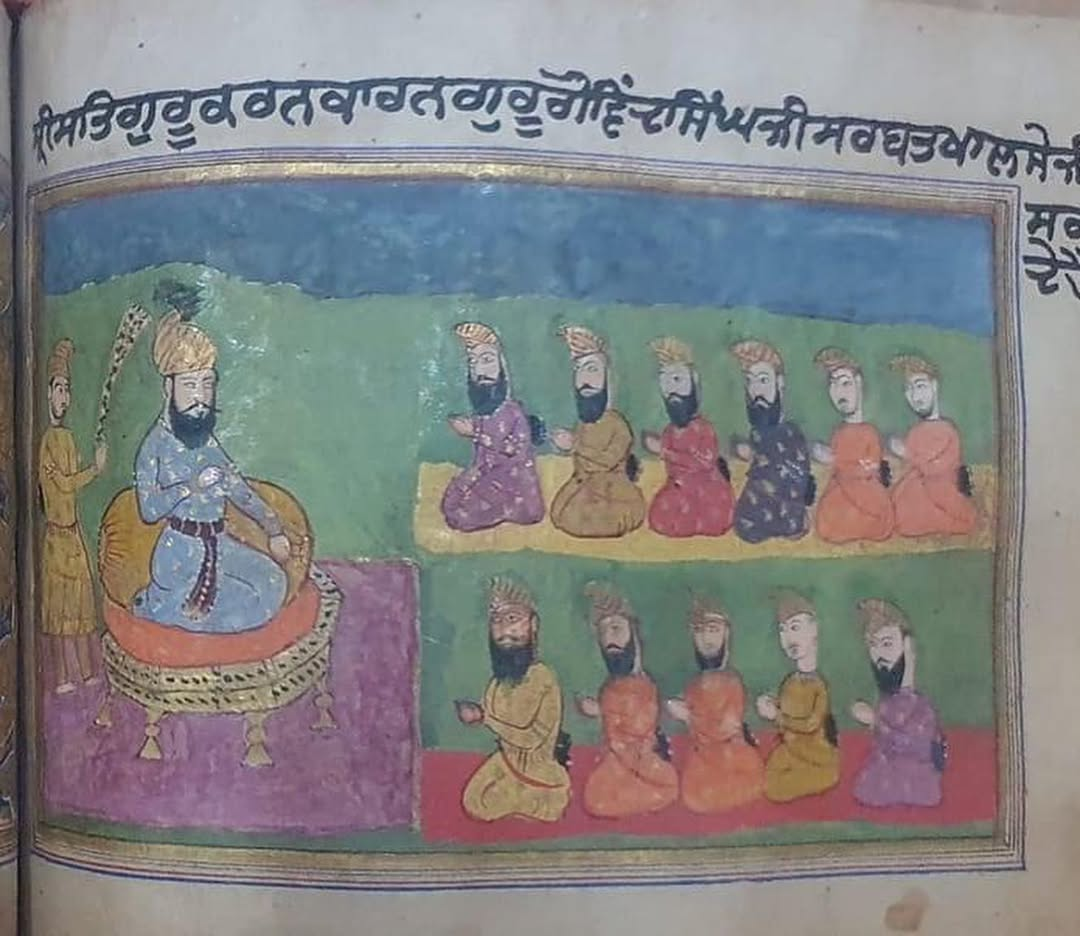
Painting of Guru Gobind Singh holding court, from a Gobind Gita manuscript, circa early 19th century

The first Sarbat Khalsa was called by the tenth guru, Guru Gobind Singh before his death in 1708 and the tradition of calling Sarbat Khalsa has continued ever since at times of hardship or conflict. After the death of Mughal emperor Farrukhsiyar in 1719, anti-Sikh persecution decreased in intensity and the Sikhs began congregating at Amritsar again periodically. The Sikhs at the time were split into two main factions, the Tatt Khalsa and the Bandai Khalsa. The next known meeting of the Sarbat Khalsa took place on the occasion of Vaisakhi in 1721 when a clash between Tat Khalsa and the Bandais (owing fealty to Banda Singh Bahadur) was averted and amicably settled through the intervention and wise counsel of Bhai Mani Singh.

The next notable Sarbat Khalsa, which was held soon after the martyrdom of Bhai Tara Singh Wan in 1726, passed a Gurmata (the decisions of the Sarbat Khalsa), laying down a threefold plan of action: to plunder government treasures in transit between local and regional offices and the central treasury; to raid government armouries for weapons and government stables for horses and carriages; and to eliminate government informers and lackeys. This Sarbat Khalsa was arranged by the Jathedar of the Akal Takht at the time, Baba Darbara Singh.

Another Sarbat Khalsa assembled in 1733 to deliberate upon and accept the government's offer of a Nawabship and jagir to the Panth. Under a gurmata of the Sarbat Khalsa on 14 October (Divali day) 1745, the active fighting force of the Sikhs was reorganized into 25 jathas (bands) of about 100 each.

A further reorganization into 11 misls (divisions) forming the Dal Khalsa was made by the Sarbat Khalsa on Baisakhi, 29 March 1748. Thus, Sarbat Khalsa became the central body of what J.D. Cunningham, in his book, A history of the Sikhs, terms a "theocratic confederate feudalism" established by the misls. On 29 April 1986, a Sarbat Khalsa at the Golden Temple declared the rebuilding of Akal Takht.

After the death of Banda Singh Bahadur in 1716 the Khalsa was in disarray. After 1716, the Mughal government began a campaign of genocide against Sikhs led by Abdus Samad Khan and later his son Zakariya Khan that was carried out by in the form of a standing army dedicated to eliminating Sikhs, daily public executions, and monetary rewards for the heads of killed Sikhs. The Dal Khalsa "retaliated by killing government functionaries and plundering Mughal posts, arsenals, and treasuries". In 1733, because of the failure of the Mughal government to subdue the Sikhs they were offered a jagir in 1733. Nawab Kapur Singh was appointed head of the Dal Khalsa and he reorganized the Sikhs into the Taruna Dal and Budda Dal. The Taruna Dal formed the basis of the Sikh Misls.

Maharaja Ranjit Singh abolished the Sarbat Khalsa in 1805. Prior to its abolition, its last convening was also held in 1805 to discuss the pursuance of the Maratha leader Yashwantrao Holkar by the British military in the Punjab.

After the demolition of the Mahant System by the Khalsa Panth, S. Kartar Singh Jhabbar called the Sarbat Khalsa in 1920. He was not the Jathedar of the Akal Takht but a Sikh leader. In the resolution of that Sarbat Khalsa, Teja Singh Bhuchhar was announced as the Jathedar of the Akal Takht.

=== Revival ===
The practice of Sarbat Khalsa has recently been revived. In 2015, a Sarbat Khalsa was held against the wishes of SGPC and announced 13 resolutions deliberated upon by the Sikh panth and its representatives.

The Shiromani Gurdwara Parbandhak Committee claims to be the modern incarnation of the Sarbat Khalsa institution, however this claim is contested.

== List of prominent Sarbat Khalsas ==
- Sarbat Khalsa (1986)
- Sarbat Khalsa (2015)

== See also ==
- Sarv Khap system of Haryana and Uttar Pradesh is similar to Sarbat Khalsa
- Jathedar of Akal Takht
- Gurmata, a term used to refer to resolutions passed by the Sarbat Khalsa
- Hukamnama, an injunction or edict issued by the Sikh gurus, their officiated followers, the Takhts, or taken from the Guru Granth Sahib
- Rakhi system, the protection tax implemented by the Sikh Confederacy
