= Akal Takht =

Sikh religious site in Amritsar, Punjab, India

- ਅਕਾਲ ਤਖ਼ਤ ਸਾਹਿਬ
- Seal of the Akal Takht

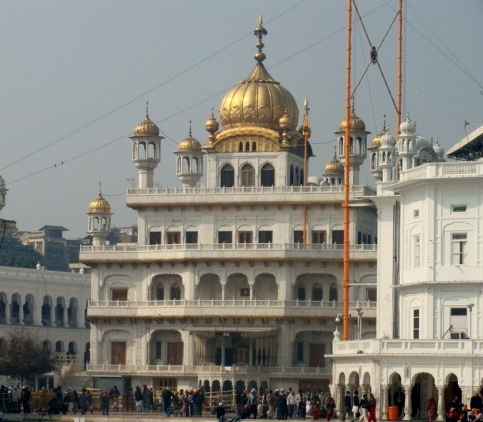
- Photograph of the Akal Takht
- Alternative names: Akal Bunga

General information
- Status: Takht (seat of authority) of the Sikhs
- Architectural style: Sikh architecture
- Location: Sri Akal Takht Sahib, Golden Temple Road, Amritsar, Punjab, India, Amritsar
- Coordinates: 31°37′14″N 74°52′31″E
- Completed: 15 June 1606 (420 years ago) by Baba Buddha and Bhai Gurdas; 1995 subsequent to the demolition during the 1986 Sarbat Khalsa
- Destroyed: Heavily damaged Misl-era structure on 6 June 1984 (42 years ago); Demolished on 26 January 1986 (40 years ago) to reject the government-sponsored repairs of the damage in 1984
- Owner: Khalsa

Website
- sgpc.net

The Akal Takht (Punjabi: ਅਕਾਲ ਤਖ਼ਤ ਸਾਹਿਬ; lit. 'Throne of the Timeless'), also spelt as Akal Takhat and historically known as Akal Bunga, is the most prominent of the five takhts (seats of authority) of the Sikhs. Located within the Darbar Sahib (Golden Temple) complex in Amritsar, Punjab, India, it was established by Guru Hargobind in 1606 as a place to uphold justice and address temporal matters. The site remains a place of decision-making for the Sikhs.

The Akal Takht represents the highest seat of earthly authority for the Khalsa, the collective body of initiated Sikhs and serves as the official seat of the jathedar, the supreme spokesperson and head of the Sikhs worldwide. The position of the jathedar is currently disputed between two factions. The Shiromani Gurdwara Parbandhak Committee (SGPC) appointed Giani Kuldip Singh Gargaj as the acting jathedar in 2025. However, the Sarbat Khalsa, organised by several Sikh organisations in 2015, had earlier declared Jagtar Singh Hawara as the jathedar.

Due to Hawara's imprisonment, the Sarbat Khalsa appointed Dhian Singh Mand as the acting jathedar in his stead. The Shiromani Gurdwara Parbandhak Committee, however, has refused to recognise the authority of the 2015 Sarbat Khalsa and does not accept its appointments.

== History ==
Mural of Guru Hargobind seated atop the original Akal Bunga (later known as the Akal Takht), from Gurdwara Baba Atal, circa 19th century

Originally known as the Akal Bunga, the building directly opposite the Harmandir Sahib was founded by the sixth Sikh Guru, Guru Hargobind, as a symbol of political sovereignty, and where the spiritual and temporal concerns of the Sikh people could be addressed. Along with Baba Buddha and Bhai Gurdas, the sixth Sikh Guru built a 9-foot-high concrete slab. When Guru Hargobind revealed the platform on 15 June 1606, he put on two swords: one indicated his spiritual authority (piri) and the other, his temporal authority (miri). According to Kanwarjit Singh Kang, the platform raised by Guru Hargobind was built in 1609, a later dating.

The first-ever structure erected on the premises was an open brick platform consecrated by Guru Hargobind. Later, a hall would be erected at the site. In the 18th century, Ahmed Shah Abdali and Massa Rangar led a series of attacks on the Akal Takht and Harmandir Sahib. Takht which is on the first floor was rebuilt in brick in 1774, under Sultan-ul-Qaum Jassa Singh Ahluwalia (1718–1783) – the leader of the Sikh Confederacy in Punjab. The renovations during the 18th century gave the building a "better shape". An Udasi mahant by the name of Pritam Das (founder of Akhara Sangalwara, also located nearby) was responsible for originally installing the dual Nishan Sahibs at the Akal Takht.

Maharaja Ranjit Singh's revamping of the building in the first half of the 19th century raised the number of stories of the structure to five. Hari Singh Nalwa, a general of Maharaja Ranjit Singh, decorated the Akal Takht with gold and is responsible for adding the golden dome at the top of the edifice. The murals that had existed in the original building had been painted around the mid-19th century. There were murals decorating the walls of the first and second stories. The structure was then rebuilt twice: once immediately after Operation Blue Star in 1984 and then again in 1986.

== Design ==
The Akal Takht was built on a site where there existed only a high mound of earth across a wide-open space. It was a place where Guru Hargobind played as a child. The original Takht was a simple platform, 3.5 metres (11 ft) high, on which Guru Hargobind would sit in court to receive petitions and administer justice. He was surrounded by insignia of royalty such as the parasol and the fly whisk. Later, there was an open-air semi-circular structure built on marble pillars and a gilded interior section. There were also painted wall panels depicting Europeans.

According to Teja Singh and Ganda Singh, the structure was built so close-by to the Harmandir Sahib because whilst the Akal Takht represents politics, the Harmandir Sahib symbolizes spirituality. People at Harmandir Sahib could glance at the Akal Takht and remember temporality whilst those in the Akal Takht can look upon the Harmandir Sahib and remember the importance of spirituality. Thus, it is a representation of the co-dependence of religion and politics and that one cannot exist without being balanced by the other, just like limbs of a body.

The modern building is a five-story structure with marble inlay and a gold-leafed dome. Three of the stories were added by Ranjit Singh in the 1800s. Contemporary restoration work found a layer of paint-decorated lime plaster that might have been part of the original structure but later than the time of Harminder.

A unique aspect of the Akal Takht is that it flies two Nishan Sahibs rather than one. The two flags are said to represent the two-sword concept of miri-piri.

== Operation Blue Star ==
In July 1983, the Sikh political party Akali Dal's President Harcharan Singh Longowal and the jathedar of the Akal Takht invited the fourteenth jathedar of Damdami taksal Jarnail Singh Bhindranwale, who was on the run for radicalized militancy in Punjab, popular in much of rural Punjab, to hide in the Golden Temple Complex, later moving to the Akal Takht to protect himself from getting arrested. Between 3 June and 8 June 1984, the Indian army conducted a counter-insurgency operation, ordered by Prime Minister Indira Gandhi, to arrest Bhindranwale. The Akal Takht was heavily damaged during this operation by the Indian Army. Bhindranwale was killed in action during an exchange of fire between the armed Militants and the Indian Army.

== Re-building ==
=== Initial government-sponsored rebuilding ===
After Operation Blue Star, the Akal Takht was rebuilt by the jathedar of Budha Dal, Baba Santa Singh. Santa Singh had been approached by Buta Singh (the then union home minister, dispatched by Indira Gandhi) for the purpose of rebuilding the structure. Buta Singh had approached many Sikh groups to gain their support in the kar seva work but all of them refused to work with the government on the reconstruction work unless government forces vacate from the shrine's premises. However, Santa Singh, alongside Narain Singh, decided to convene a Sarbat Khalsa on 11 August 1984, where it was decided that Santa Singh and his faction of Sikhs would assist with the government-sponsored kar seva work. Many institutions such as the Damdami Taksal, felt that the Nihang Singhs should not have taken money from the government to rebuild the Takht, and thus protested against the effort. Some Sikhs termed the government-sponsored kar seva work by Santa Singh as "sarkari seva" derogatorily since personnel and materials sourced from government departments was used for the rebuilding. The government-sponsored rebuilding was swift, with it being completed in one and a half months. A contract had been given to a private company, Skipper Builders, operated by Tejwant Singh, for the reconstruction effort.

Santa Singh defended his actions by saying the Akal Takht's Jathedar, clergy, and the SGPC had not opposed Jarnail Singh Bhindranwale holing himself and his supporters up in the Takht, which led to the government military operation and the original shrine's destruction in the ensuing conflict. He claimed that he had done a great service for the Sikhs by rebuilding the structure.

=== Destruction of the government-sponsored rebuilt Akal Takht by anti-government Sikhs ===
A few years later, Bhindranwale's successor from Damdami Taksal, Baba Thakur Singh, had the government-sponsored rebuilt Akal Takht demolished, and rebuilt after resolutions were passed by Sarbat Khalsa 1986. The rebuilt Akal Takht under the patronage of Santa Singh was demolished in January 1986. Santa Singh was excommunicated from the Sikh religion in the aftermath by the Akal Takht's clergy as punishment for violating "Sikh maryada". However, Santa Singh rejoined the religion officially in March 2001.

=== Loss of cultural heritage ===
Originally, wall paintings had existed on the first and second stories of the building. Kanwarjit Singh Kang dates the execution of the wall paintings to the mid-19th century. Of the frescoes dating to the middle of the 19th century that once embellished the walls of the edifice, only 10 fresco panels survived by 1971. These frescoes had survived painted on the walls of the second-story of the structure. Their colours had been bleached and portions of the plaster at various places were peeling-off.

Of the ten surviving murals documented in 1971 on the second-story, three of them depicted themes related to Guru Hargobind. The first was the Guru meeting with Sri Chand, son of Guru Nanak. In this mural was also depicted the five children of the sixth guru, them namely being: Gurditta, Ani Rai, Suraj Mal, Atal Rai, and Tyag Mal (later Guru Tegh Bahadur). The second mural panel depicted a scene of Guru Hargobind listening to music being performed by instrumentalists. The third panel depicted Bidhi Chand presenting the retrieved stolen horses, Dilbagh and Gulbagh, to Guru Hargobind. Bhagat Kabir was depicted in the fourth mural taking care of daily chores alongside his family, Bhagat Sain in the fifth is depicted alongside Raja Rana, and saint Dharuva in the sixth. The seventh panel portrayed Krishna eating rice that was offered by his childhood friend, Sudama. The eighth panel depicted Rama seated alongside Sita on a couch whilst being attended upon by both Lakshmana and Hanuman. The ninth panel illustrated a scene of a hunting expedition involving a horse and three hunting hounds in an advancing pose. Finally, the last and tenth panel represented a scene of the Vaisakhi events of 1699 at Anandpur, where Guru Gobind Singh prepares Amrit for the newly introduced Amrit Sanchar ceremony whilst Mata Jito appends sugar crystals to the formulae he is stirring, whilst the inaugural Panj Piare watch-on.

Mural panels from the second-story of the original structure

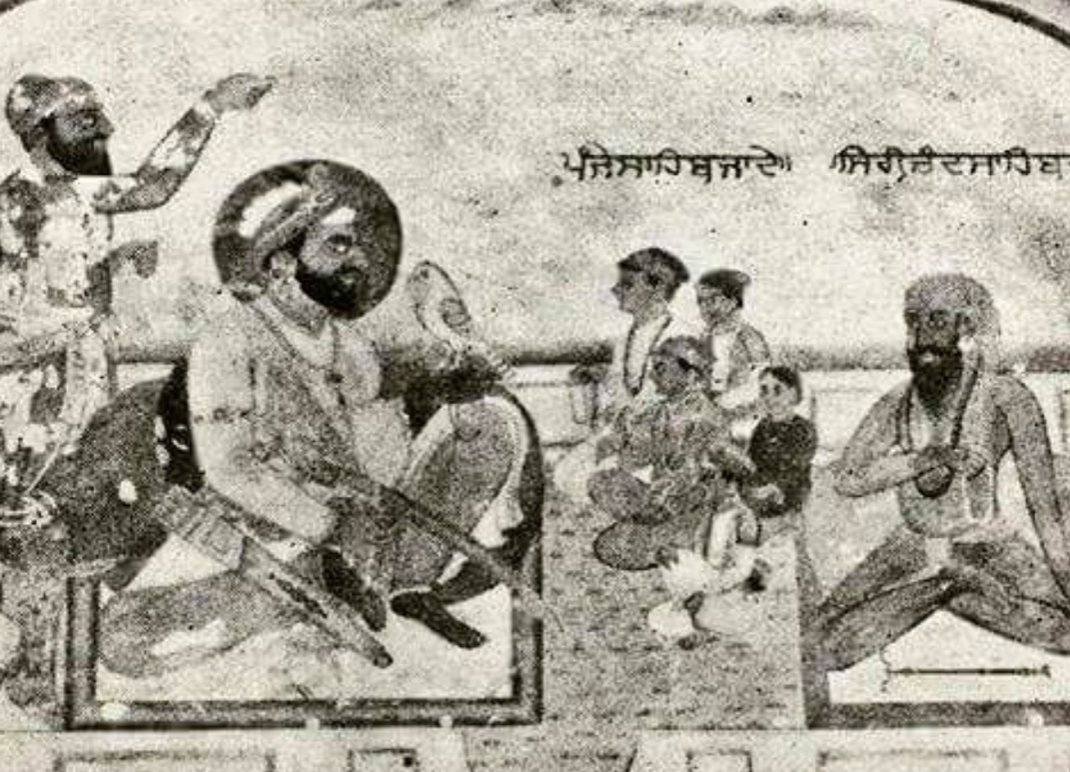
Panel 1: Guru Hargobind with Sri Chand

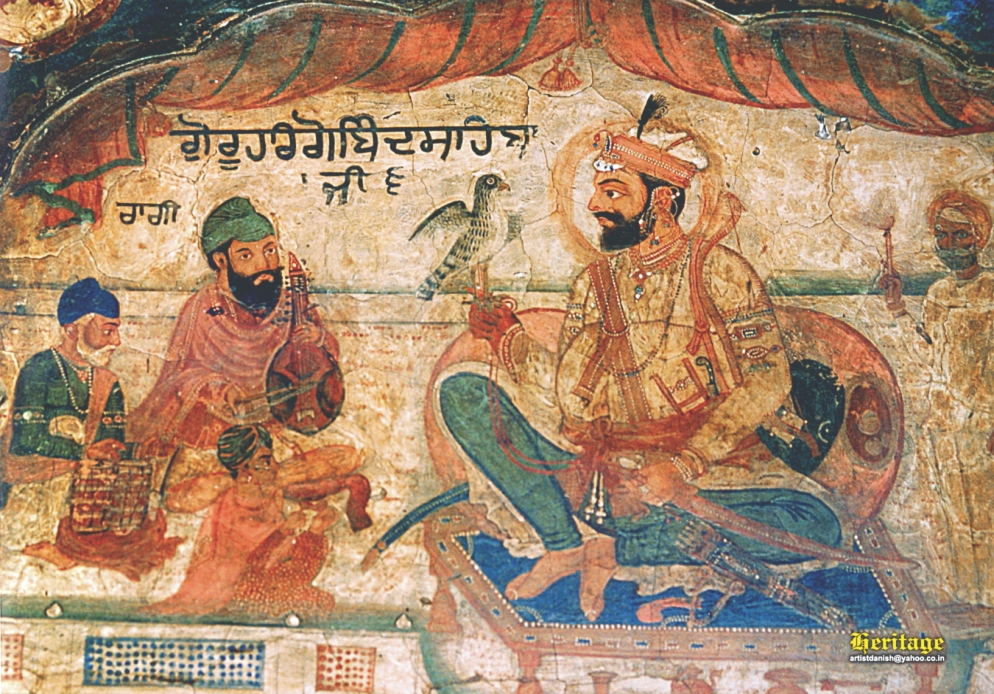
Panel 2: Guru Hargobind with musicians

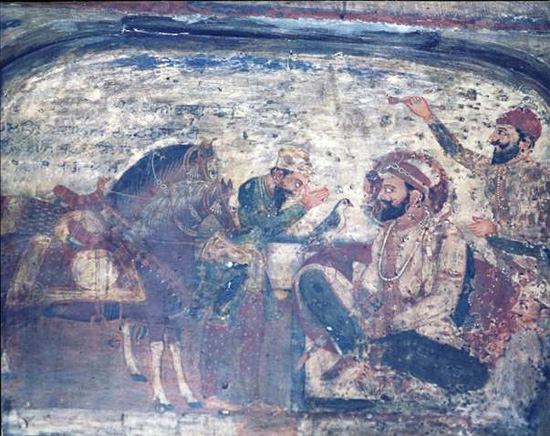
Panel 3: Bidhi Chand returns the stolen horses to Guru Hargobind

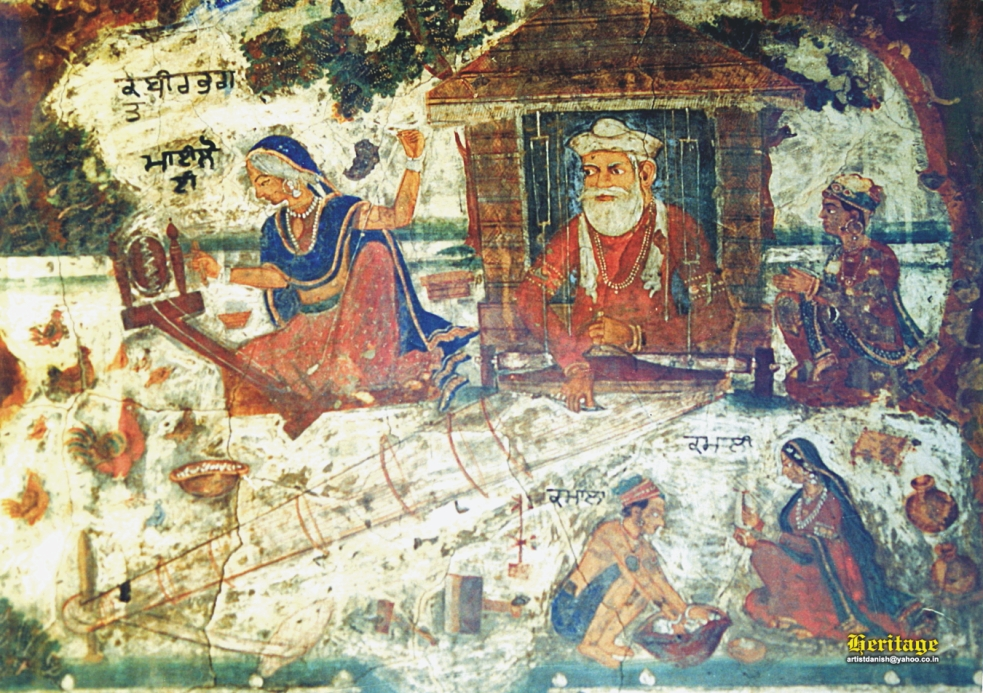
Panel 4: Bhagat Kabir

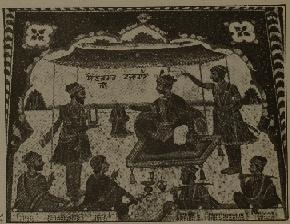
Panel 5: Bhagat Sain

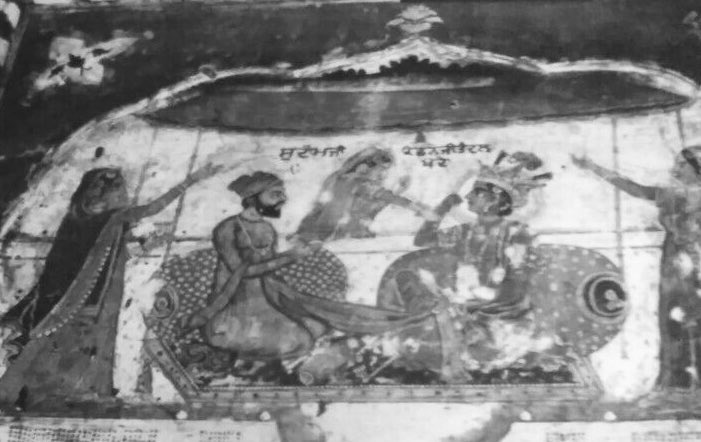
Panel 7: Krishna eating rice that was offered by his childhood friend Sudama

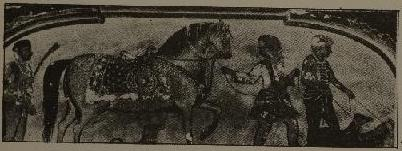
Panel 9: Horses and hounds being led by Sikhs

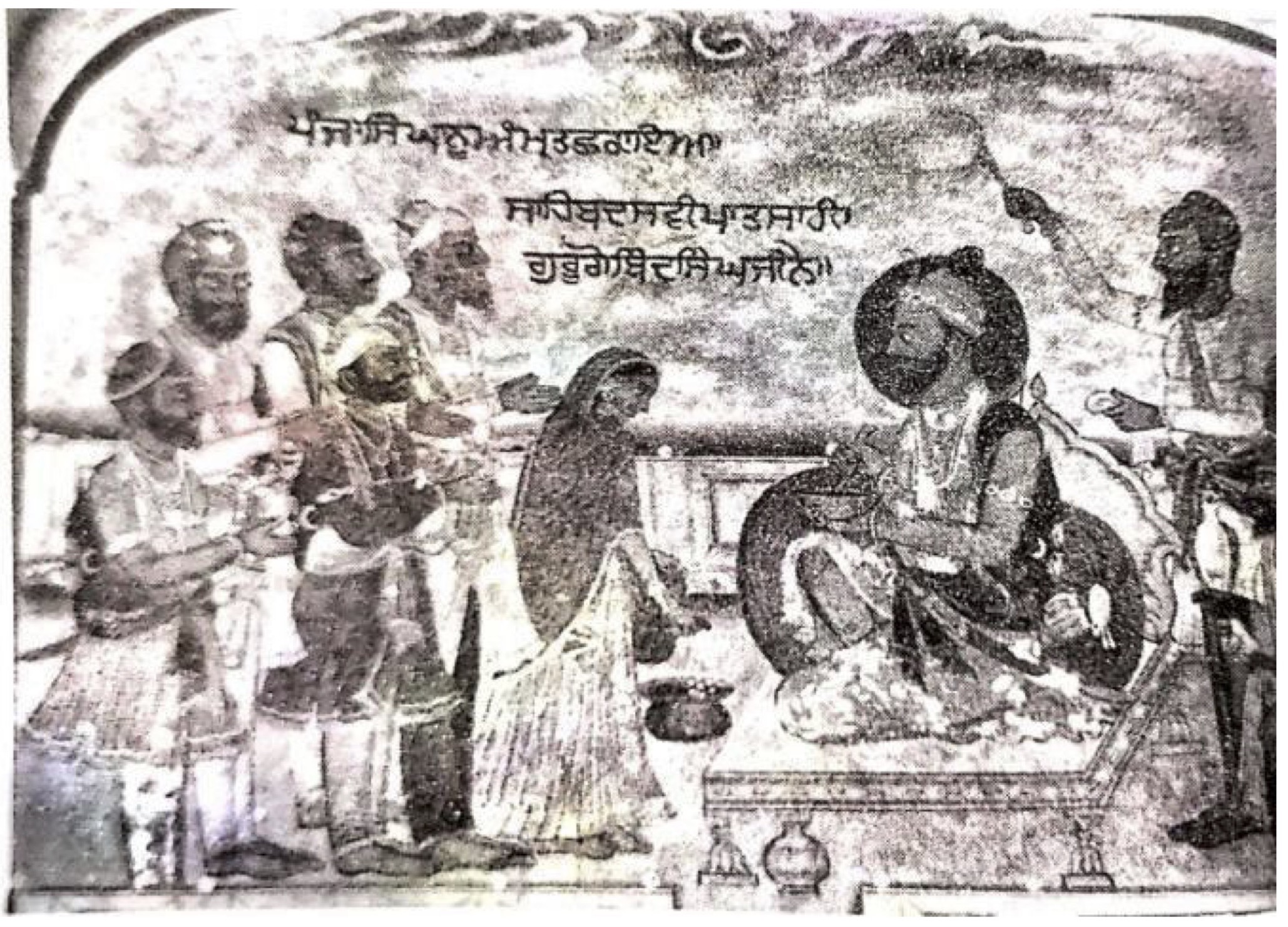
Panel 10: Amrit Sanchar of the 1699 Vaisakhi at Anandpur

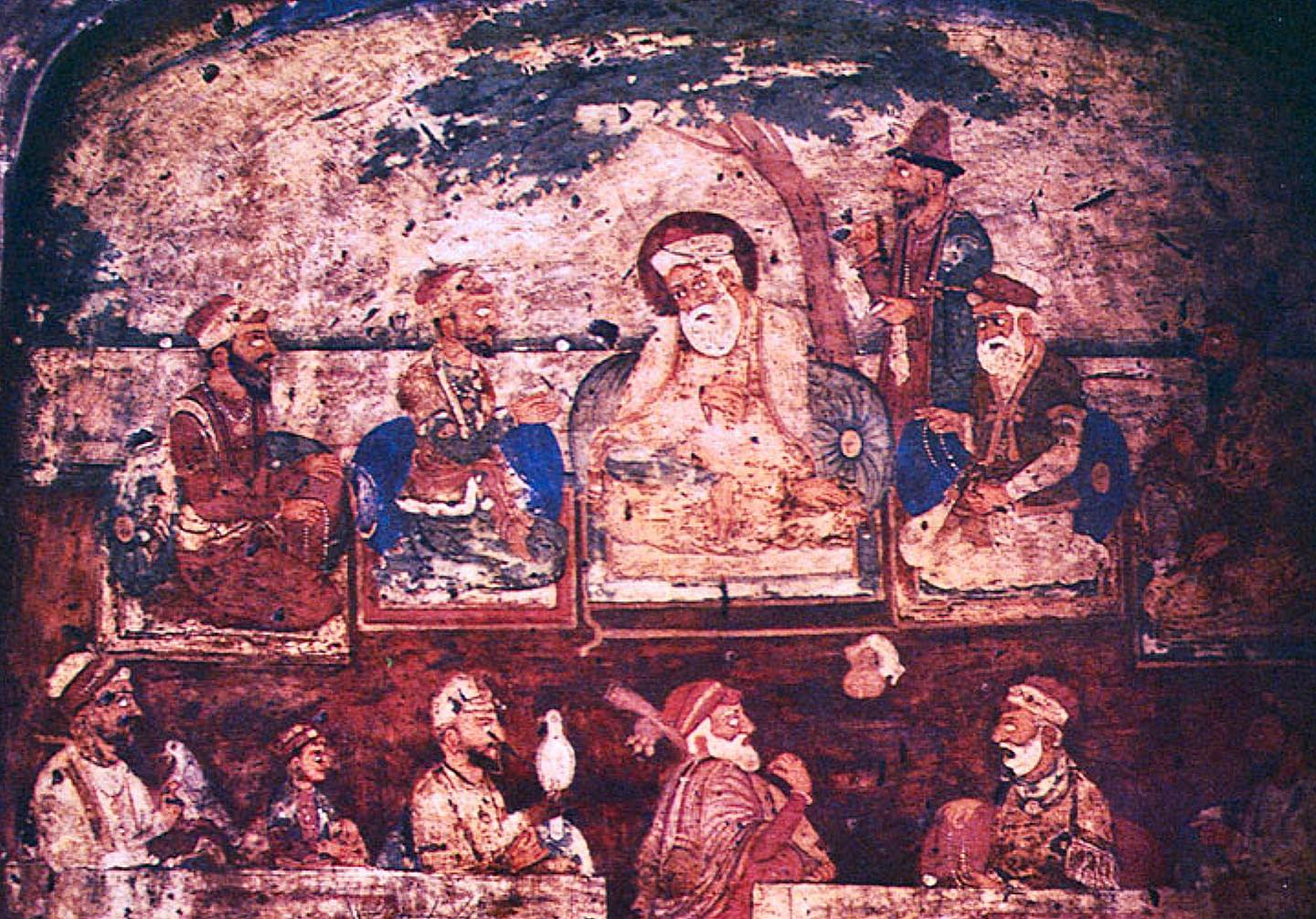
Fresco of the Sikh gurus together and also Mardana and Bala from the original Akal Takht complex. Destroyed in January 1986 when the structure was completely demolished to make way for the present-day building

After Operation Blue Star, the surviving Akal Takht structure still contained historical artwork dating to the mid-to-late 18th century, such as ivory mosaic work, in-laid stone work (jaratkari), and wall paintings (murals). The murals had depicted Indic mythological scenes, deities, and bhagats and had been painted by expert Sikh artisans (naqqashis). Of the frescoes, there were depictions of Krishna accepting wet rice from Sudama, Rama, Bhagat Dhanna, Bhagat Dhruv, and of Bhagat Kabir at work as a weaver in a hut alongside Mai Loi (Kabir's wife). There also were lion figurines made of marble. They survived until January 1986, when the Takht was completely demolished to make way for the present-day structure.

During the destruction of the historical structure, the original raised platform that Guru Hargobind had erected located at the base of the built-around structure (where the Guru used to address the gathered Sikh congregation from) was also at-risk of being demolished but protest by Giani Mohinder Singh (former SGPC secretary), then an elderly and respected Sikh, whom took the matter up with Gurdev Singh Kaunke, then Jathedar of the Akal Takht, to save it from destruction by ignorant Kar Seva volunteers who had no idea of its importance.

The present-day Akal Takht lacks many of the historical and cultural intangible heritage that was once found in the original structure. Conservators have raised alarms that the present structure was not designed with the traditional Sikh art style in-mind. They further claimed that any present art works within the shrine would not last very long, since they used artificially-sourced pigments and non-traditional methods, as opposed to the naturally-sourced pigments used by the traditional Sikh art school. Amrik Singh, the SGPC supervisor of the kar seva renovations at the Akal Takht, claims the new methods are better than the traditional methods and that the older methods are "impracticable". He further claims that the present-day structure is designed differently from the original one. A kar seva group leader, Jagtar Singh (Dera Baba), was responsible for the renovations of the structure under the instruction of the SGPC. Enamel paint was apparently used in the present structure, Amrik Singh claims only water-based paints were used and they did not fade for over five years. The fresco work of the present structure was mostly carried out by the artist Harbhajan Singh, who also had helped retouch frescoes located in the Golden Temple shrine. However, Sukhdev Singh, the state convener of INTACH (Indian National Trust for Art and Cultural Heritage) requested that all the kar seva renovators use "old materials and styles, in consonance with what is in the sanctum sanctorum of the Golden Temple". He further criticized the use of synthetic and bright colours, which he decried as being alien to the traditional Sikh school of art.

== Gallery ==
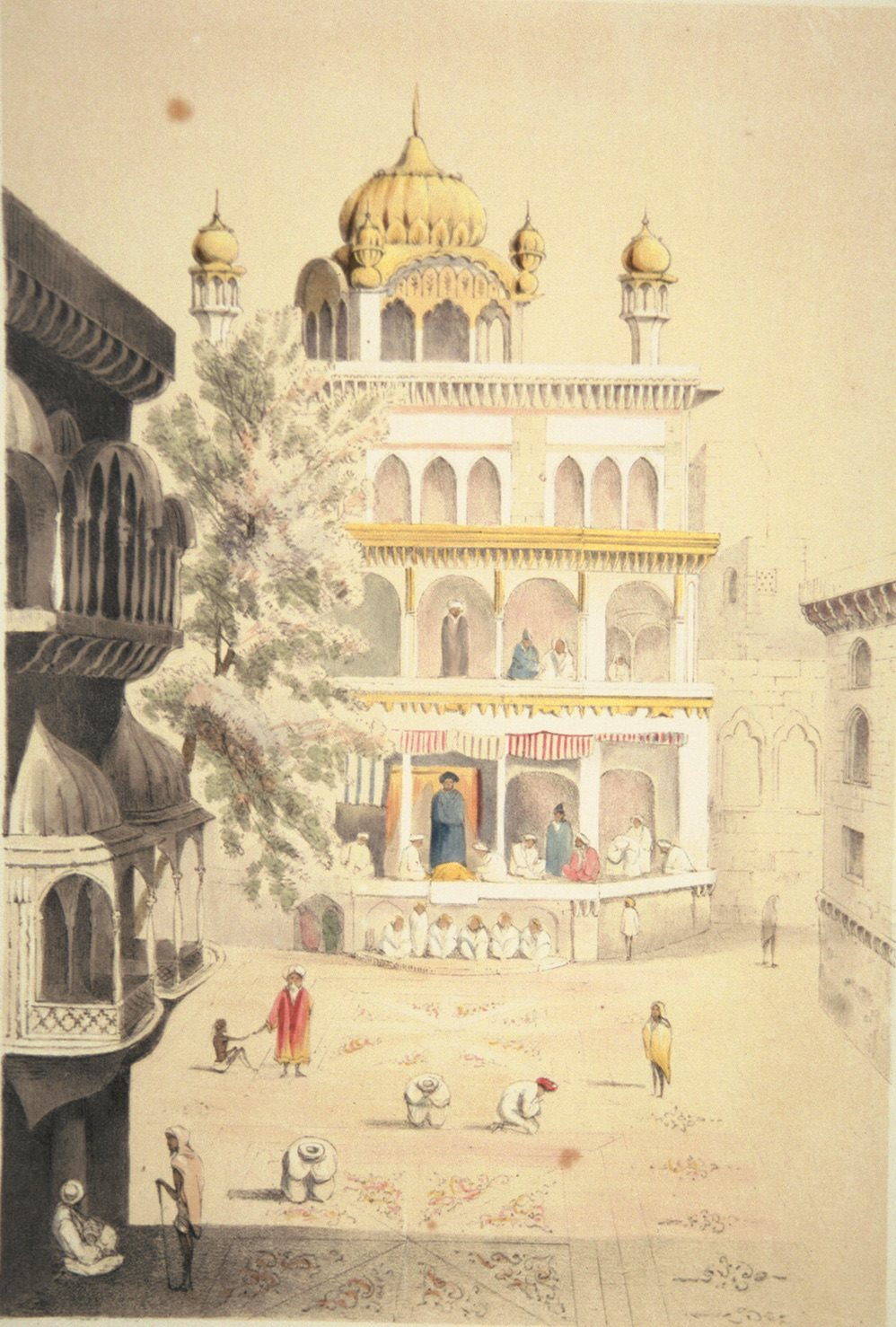
Painting of the Akal Takht from 'Original sketches in the Punjaub by a Lady', circa 1854

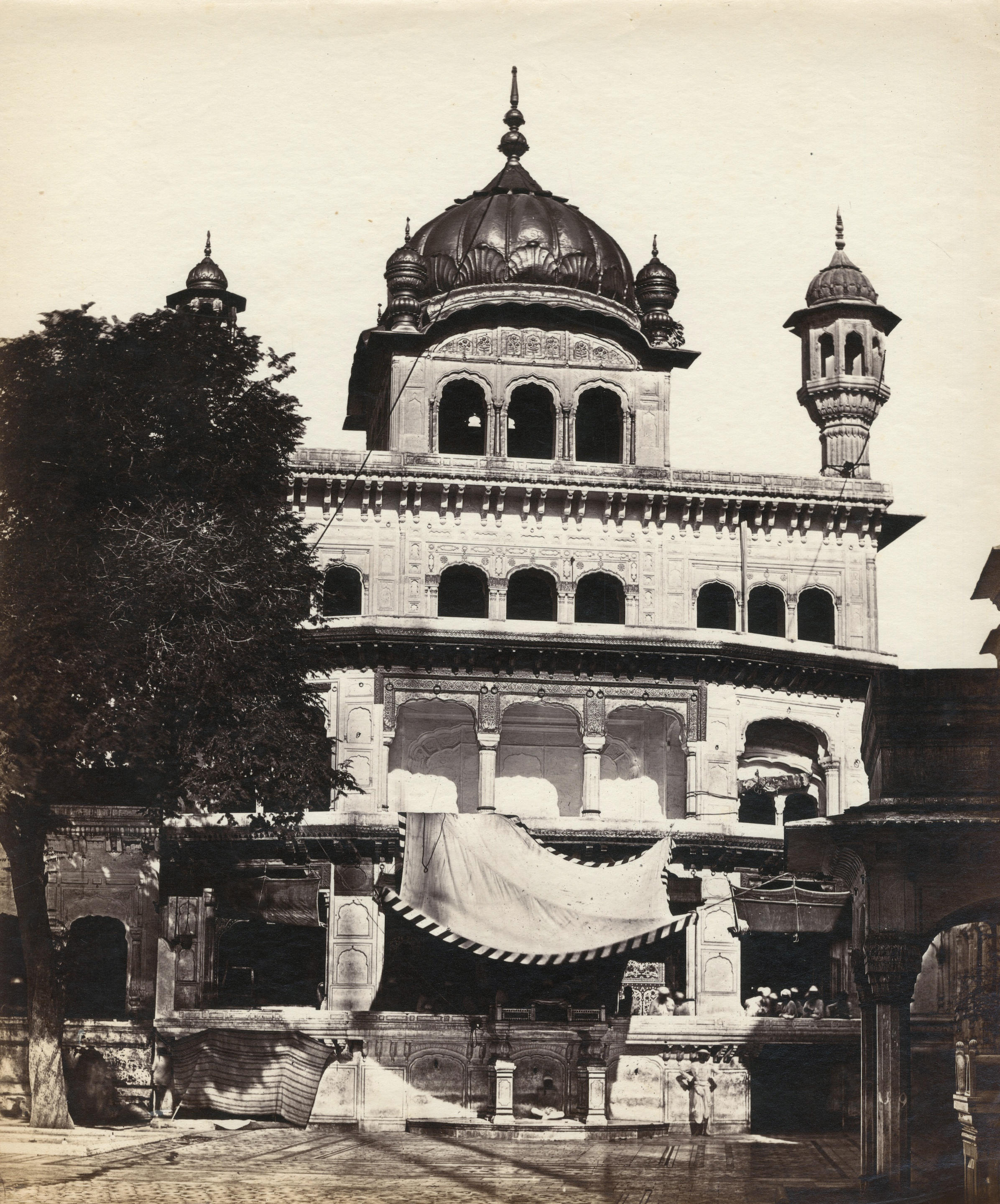
Photograph of the Akal Takht in Amritsar, circa 1850's

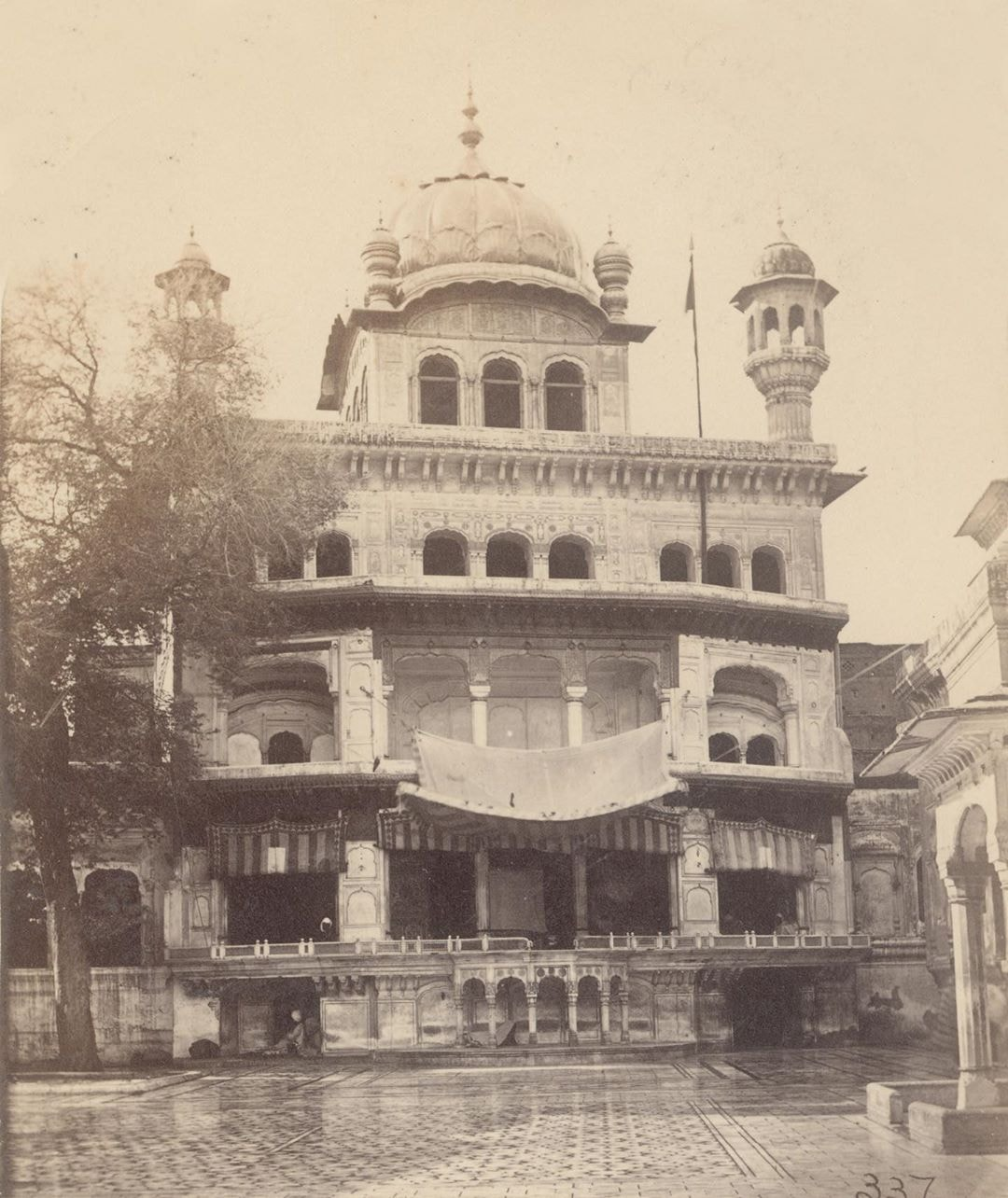
Photograph of the Akal Takht in Amritsar from circa 1870

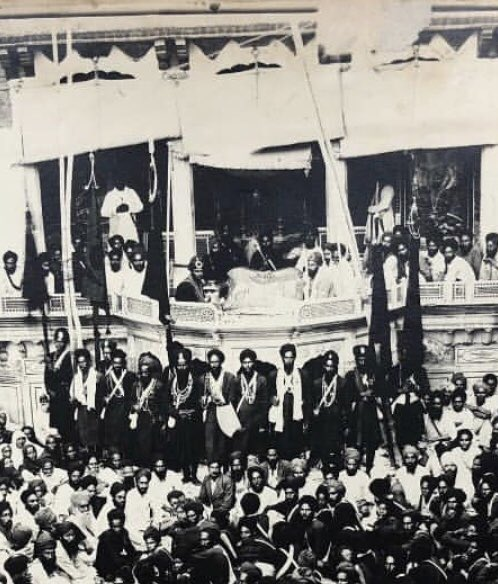
Photograph of a 'Panthic Morcha' held at the Akal Takht in Amritsar, circa 1900

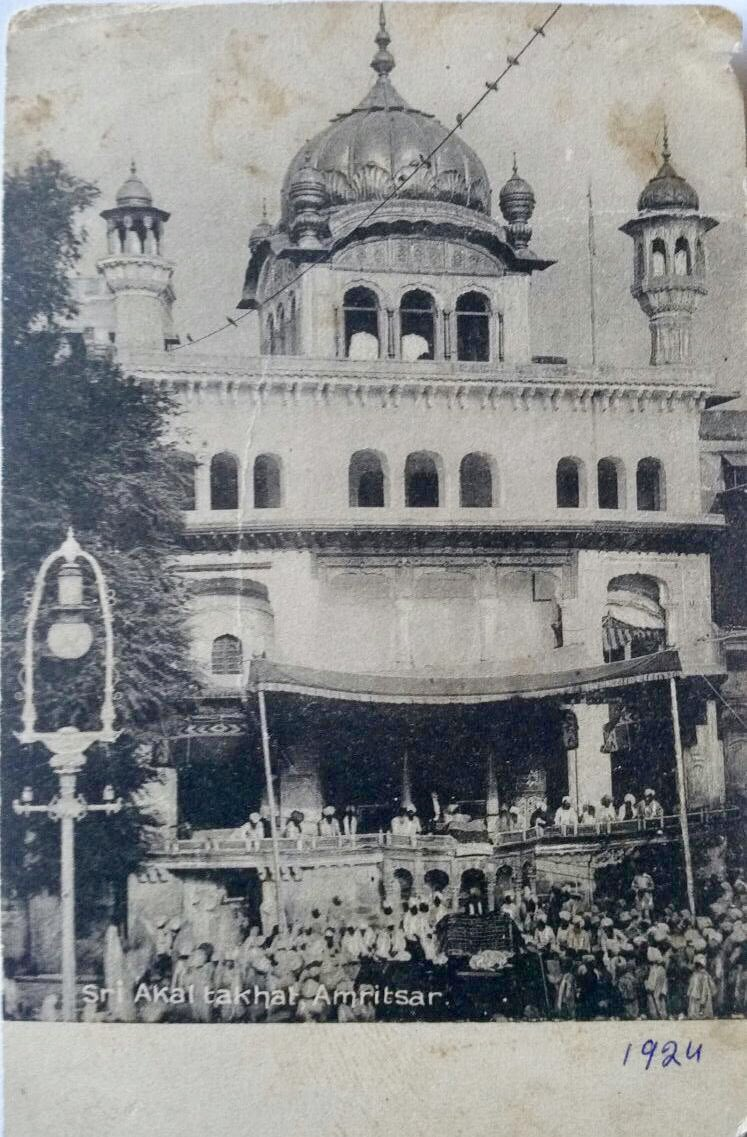
Photograph of the Akal Takht in Amritsar from circa 1924

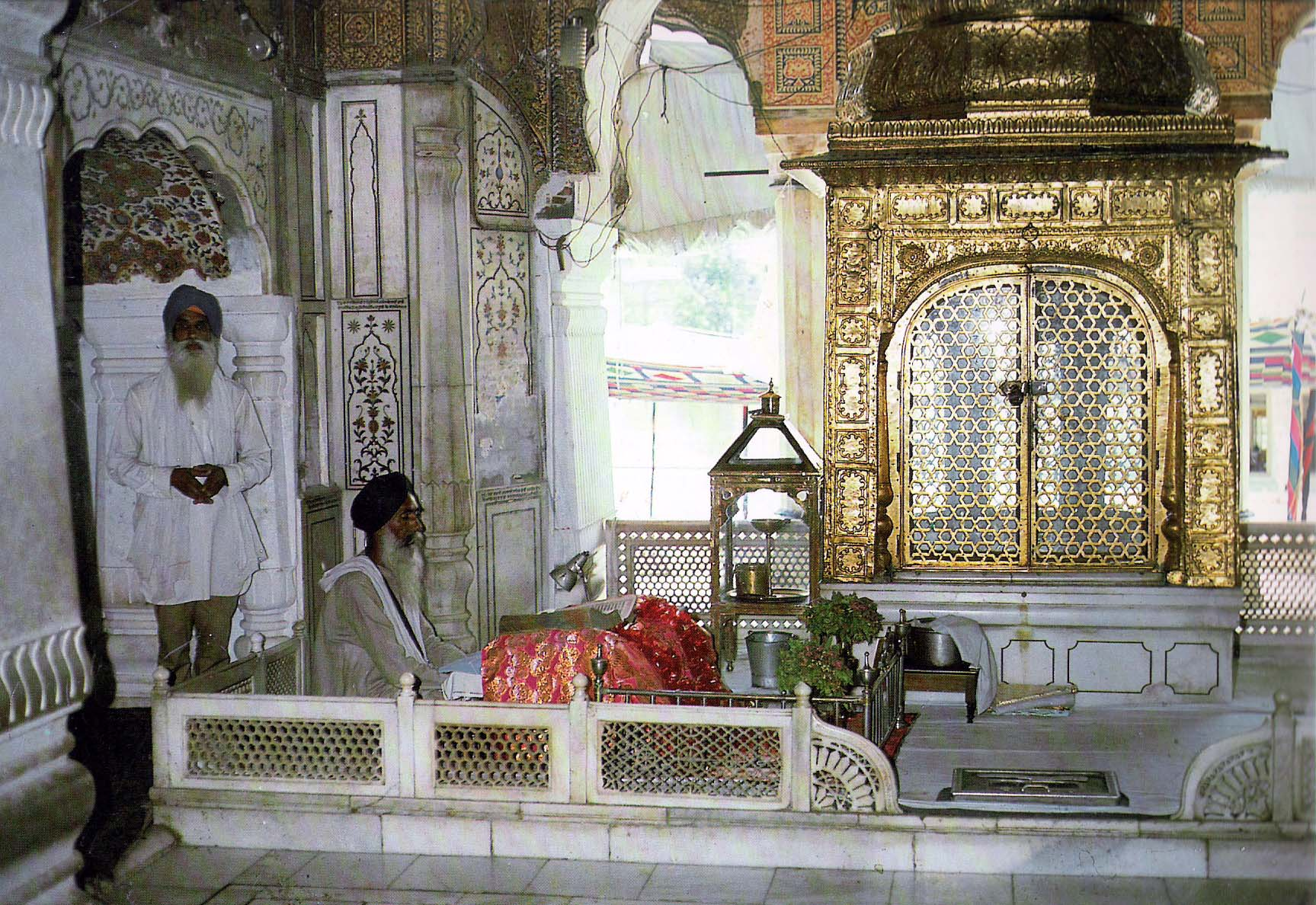
Interior of the pre-1984 Akal Takht

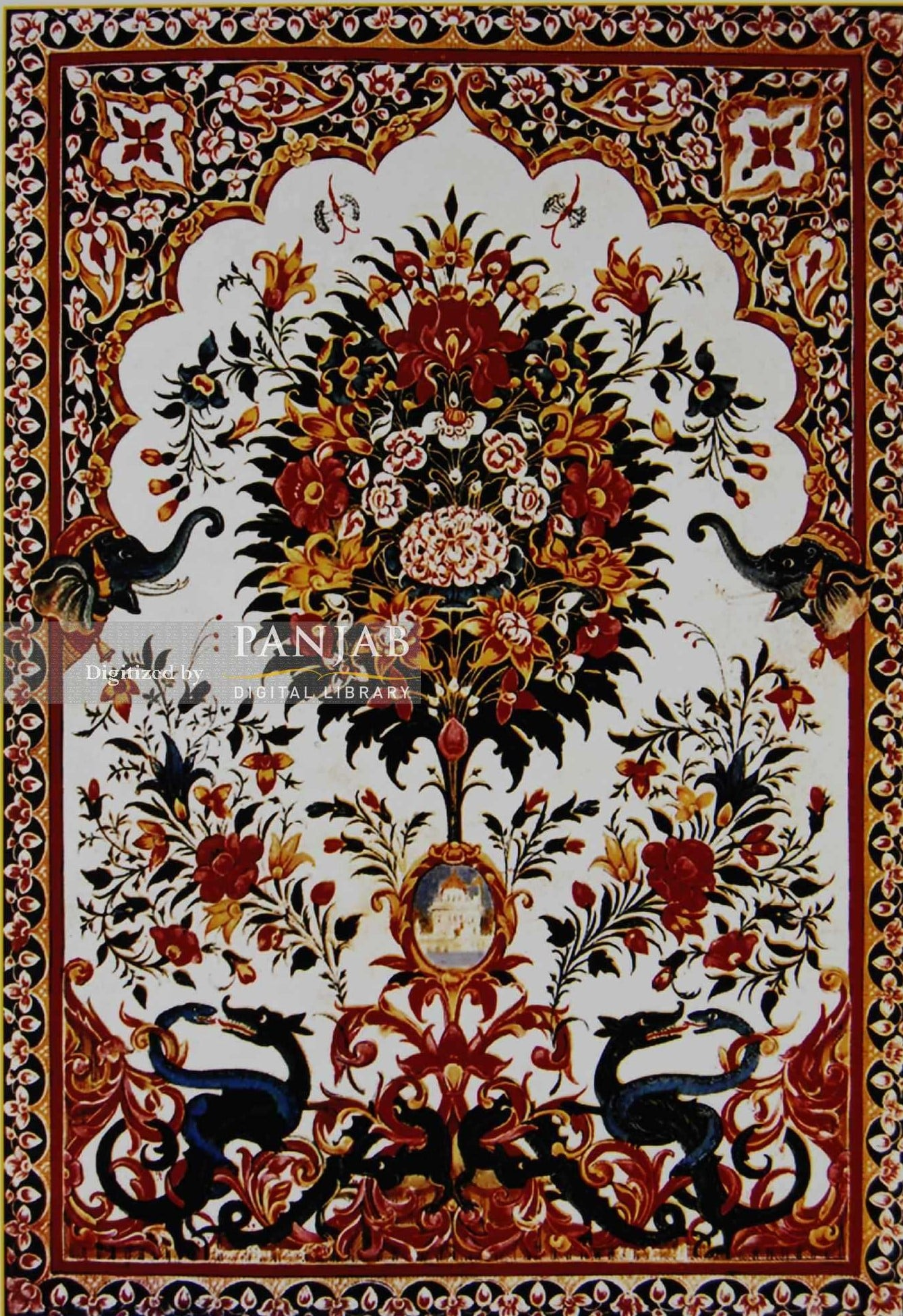
Fresco of floral motifs and the building structure from the walls of pre-1984 Akal Takht complex

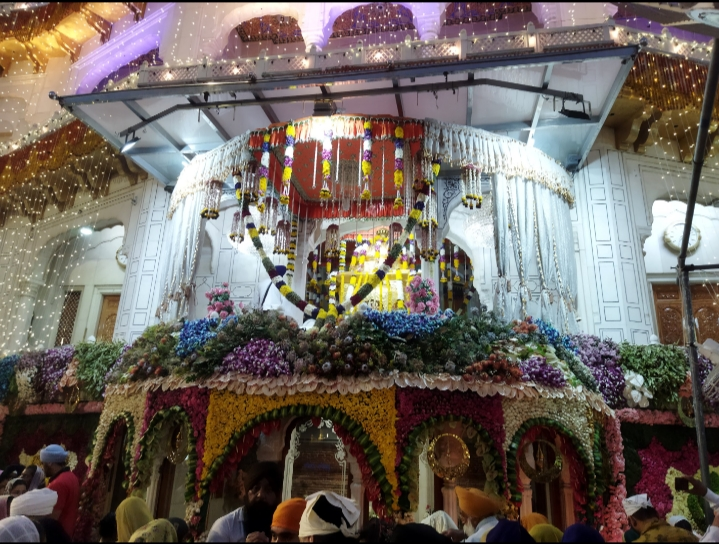
Akal Takht illuminated on Gurpurb, Harmandir Sahib complex, Amritsar

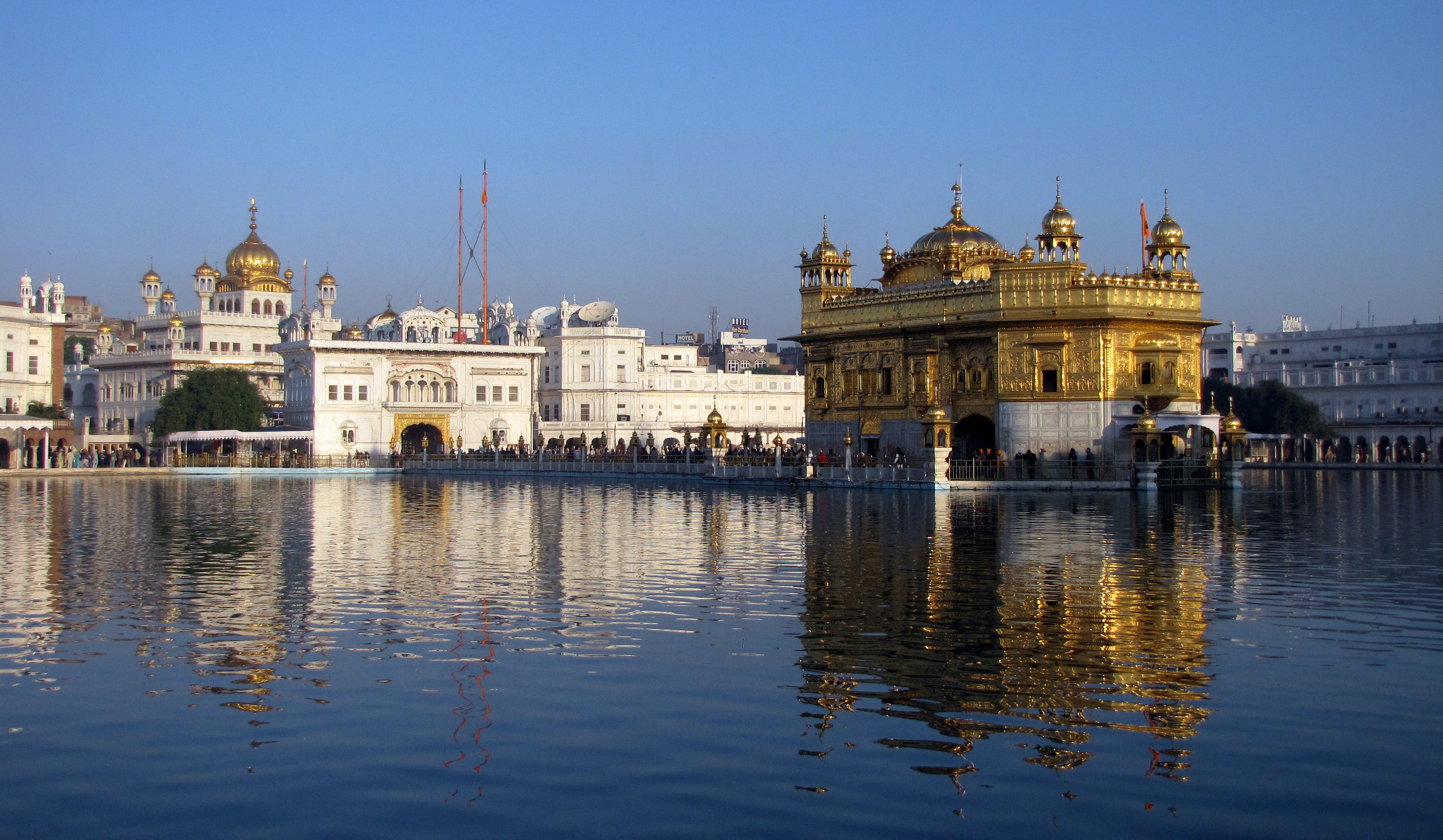
Akal Takht and Harmandir Sahib, Amritsar, Punjab, India

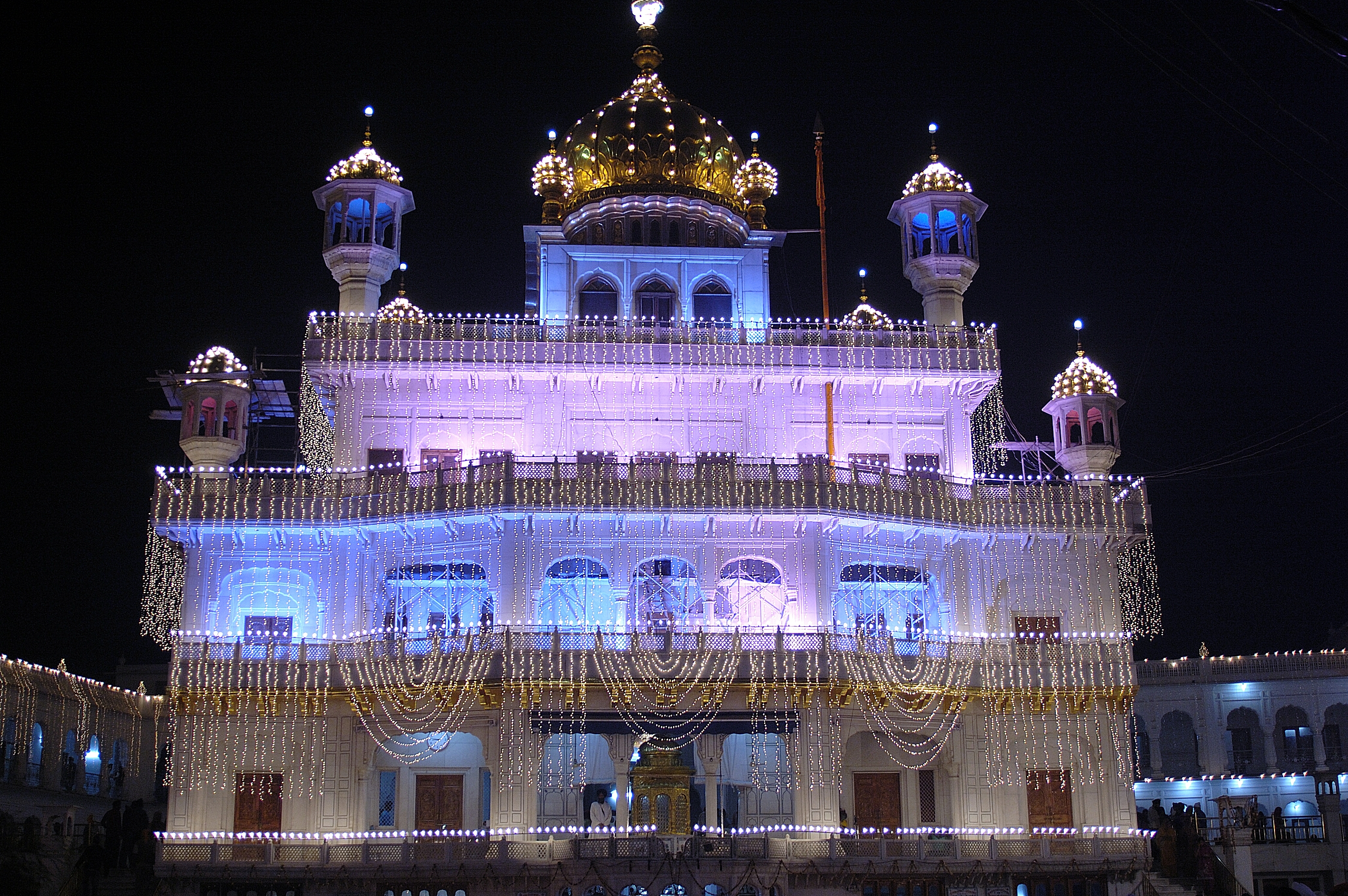
Akal Takht illuminated, in Harmandir Sahib complex, Amritsar

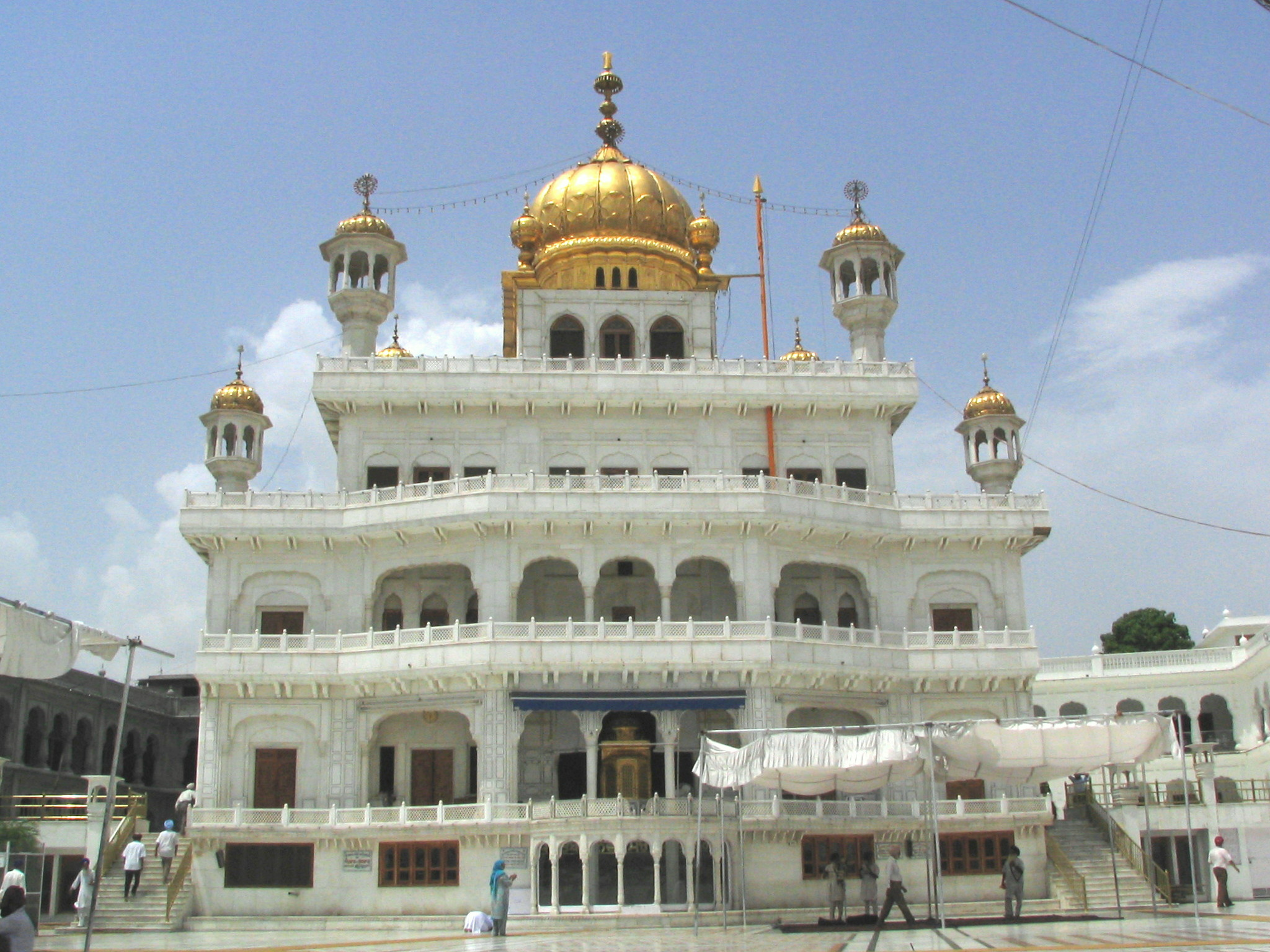
Photograph of the Akal Takht in Amritsar

== Sources ==
- Harjinder Singh Dilgeer The Akal Takht, Sikh University Press, 1980.
- Harjinder Singh Dilgeer Sikh Twareekh Vich Akal Takht Sahib Da Role, Sikh University Press 2005.
- Harjinder Singh Dilgeer Akal Takht Sahib, concept and role, Sikh University Press 2005.
- Harjinder Singh Dilgeer Sikh Twareekh, Sikh University Press 2008.
- Mohinder Singh Josh Akal Takht Tay is da Jathedar 2005.
- Darshi A. R. The Gallant Defender
- Singh P. The Golden Temple. South Asia Books 1989. ISBN 978-962-7375-01-2.
- Singh K. (ed.) New insights into Sikh art. Marg Publications. 2003. ISBN 978-81-85026-60-2.
- Nomination of Sri Harimandir Sahib for inclusion on the UNESCO World Heritage List Vol.1 Nomination Dossier, India 2003.
- Macauliffe, M. A. The Sikh religion: Its gurus, sacred writings and authors Low Price Publications, 1903. ISBN 978-81-7536-132-4.
