= Panjab University Bachao Morcha =

Student protest coalition at Panjab University, Chandigarh

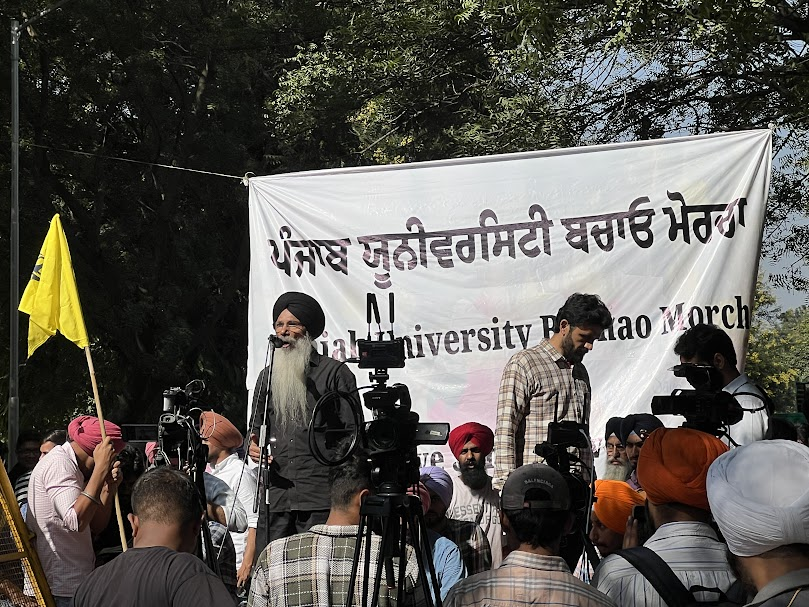
A rally of Panjab University Bachao Morcha on 10 November 2025

Panjab University Bachao Morcha (PUBM) is a student-led protest coalition at Panjab University, Chandigarh, India, formed in early November 2025 in response to proposed changes in the university's governance structure and delays in holding Senate elections.

The movement's core demands are restoration of the pre–28 October 2025 Senate structure and immediate announcement of long-pending Senate election dates, which had not been notified even after the Union Ministry of Education withdrew its restructuring notification in early November 2025. Between 1 and 17 November 2025, the Morcha organised an indefinite sit-in (dharna), a campus shutdown on 10 November, and later called for a boycott of examinations scheduled from 18 November onwards. The agitation led to postponement of examinations across Panjab University and more than 200 affiliated colleges, drew national media attention, and triggered political debate over university autonomy and Punjab's role in Panjab University.

== Background ==
The Senate's term had expired on 31 October 2024, but elections were not held for over a year, leading to a prolonged period without an elected governing body.

On 28 October 2025, the Union Ministry of Education issued a notification proposing major restructuring, including reducing the Senate from 91 members to 31 and abolishing the Graduate constituency elections. Critics argued that the proposal would centralise control, weaken representation, and dilute Punjab's historic stake in the university.

Following protests and political pressure from Punjab-based organisations and parties, the Union government withdrew or placed the notification in abeyance.

== Formation ==
PUBM emerged in the first days of November 2025 as a joint front of student organisations opposing the restructuring and demanding Senate elections. The coalition includes student wings associated with the Aam Aadmi Party, Indian National Congress, Shiromani Akali Dal, Left organisations, and independents. ABVP supported a smaller Senate but did not join the joint front.

== Objectives and demands ==
- Immediate notification of Senate elections under the pre–28 October structure.
- Withdrawal of centralisation attempts in governance.
- Withdrawal of FIRs registered against protesters.
- Consultation with stakeholders before future governance changes.

== Timeline (1–17 November 2025) ==
=== Indefinite dharna ===
PUBM launched a continuous dharna beginning in early November. After the rollback of the notification, student leaders continued the agitation, insisting on immediate election dates.

=== 10 November mobilisation ===
PUBM called for a campus shutdown on 10 November 2025. Heavy security was deployed ahead of the protest. Reports estimated over 5,000 protesters entered the campus, resulting in barricade breaches and clashes with police. The protest drew support from farmer leaders and prominent political figures.

=== Exam boycott and postponement ===
On 15 November, PUBM called for a boycott of exams beginning 18 November. Soon after, Panjab University postponed examinations scheduled for 18–20 November.

== Participation and support ==
The movement has drawn support from:

- Student groups across ideological lines
- Farmer unions involved in the 2020–21 farmers’ protest
- Panthic organisations and Nihang groups
- Politicians from major parties in Punjab

== Government and university response ==
PU has stated that a proposed Senate election schedule was forwarded to the Chancellor and is awaiting approval. The Punjab BJP stated that the restructuring will not be implemented.

== Criticism and controversies ==
Concerns raised include:

- Violence and barricade breaches on 10 November
- Influence of political and non-student actors
- Internal differences among student organisations

== Impact ==
- Postponement of exams for thousands of students
- Rollback of the governance restructuring order
- Increased debate about PU's governance and Punjab's representation
- Major revival of student political mobilisation
