= Battle of Anandpur (1699) =

Battle between Sikh forces and the Hill State

- Part of Hill States–Sikh Wars
Date	23rd June,1699
Location	Anandpur Sahib
Result	Sikh victory

Belligerents
Khalsa Fauj	Two Hill States

Commanders and leaders
Guru Gobind Singh; Bhai Uday Singh; Alam Singh Nachna	Alim Chand (WIA); Balia Chand †

Strength
Unknown	Unknown, believed to be larger

Casualties and losses
Unknown	Unknown

The Battle of Anandpur was fought between the Sikh forces led by Guru Gobind Singh and the Hill State forces by Alim and Balia Chand. This was the first major battle fought after the formation of the Khalsa.

== Background ==
The neighboring Hill chiefs began to despise the Guru over his growing popularity. Sikhs were also frequently ambushed and attack by the men of the Raja and which caused unrest between the Sikhs and Rajas.

== Battle ==
On the 23rd of June 1699, the Guru was on a hunting trip in the Dun when Balia Chand and Alim Chand, two hill kings, seeing him with only a small retinue, launched a surprise attack in a bid to capture the Guru. The combined forces of the 2 kings far outnumbered the Sikhs. Soon, reinforcements under Bhai Uday Singh reached and the tables were turned. Alam Chand had his right hand cut off by Alam Singh Nachna and fled from the battlefield. Balia Chand was shot by Udai Singh and died. The hill troops, demoralized by the retreat and death of their generals, the kings retreated.

== Aftermath ==
The defeat of the 2 kings unnerved the hill Rajas, who met in a council and decided to send a letter to the Mughal Emperor Aurangzeb for help. Then the Mughals fought the Sikhs in the Battle of Anandpur (1700).

== See also ==
- Nihang
- Martyrdom and Sikhism
