= Alam Singh Nachna =

Sikh warrior (died 1704 or 1705)

Bhai Alam Singh Nachna
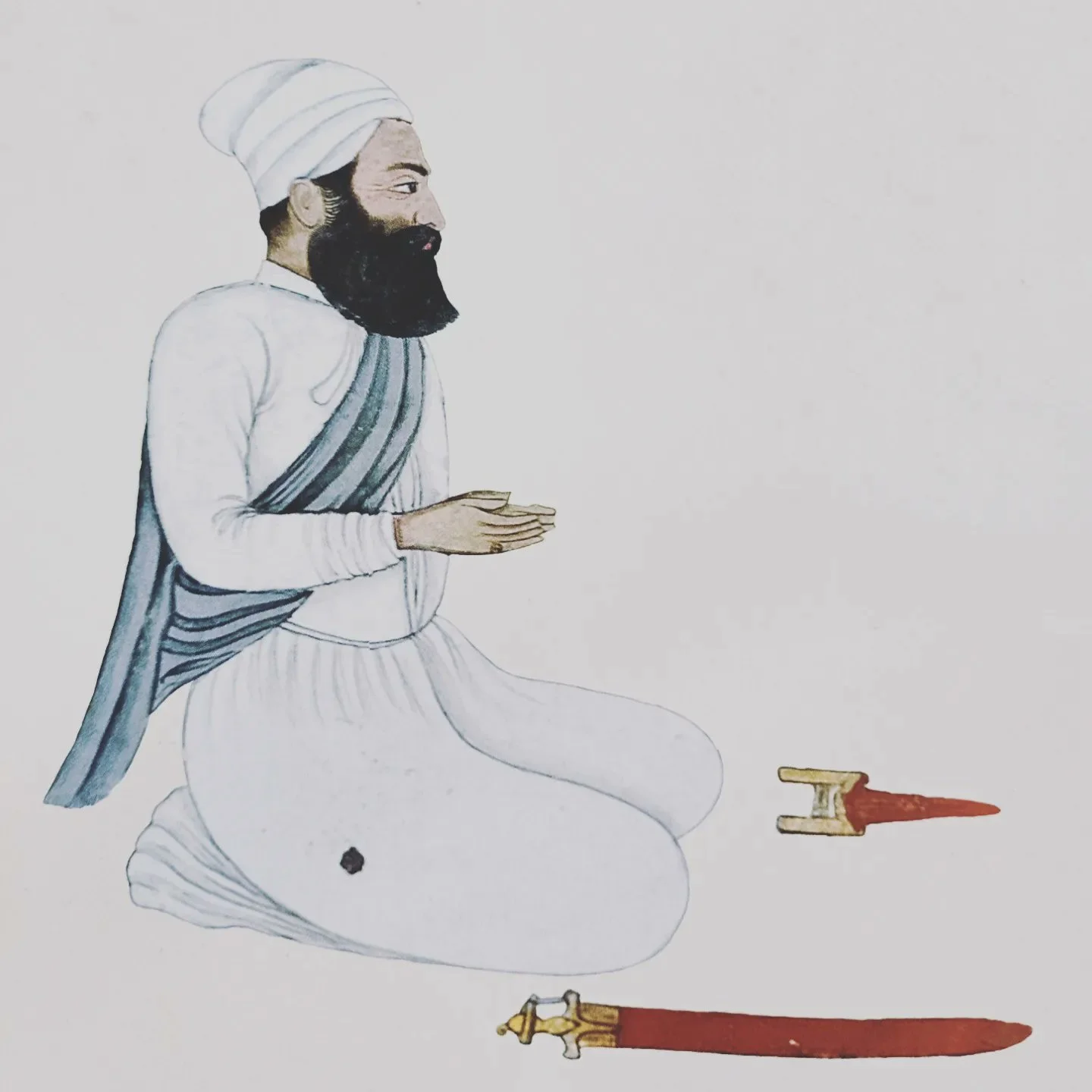
- Painting of Alam Singh Nachna
- Born: Alam Chand
- Died: 22 December 1704 or 1705
- Relatives: Bhai Durgu (father)
- Military career
- Allegiance: Akal Sena; Khalsa Fauj
- Known for: Sikh warrior and companion of Guru Gobind Singh

Alam Singh Nachna (died 22 December 1704 or 1705), also called Alim Singh, was a warrior in the army of Guru Gobind Singh, and was a Rajput turned Sikh. Sarup Das Bhalla of Mahima Prakash describes him as one of Guru Gobind Singh's constant and closest companions. He is also known for killing a lion single handedly.

== Biography ==
=== Name ===
He was born as Alam Chand. He earned the popular epithet of Nachna (lit. "dancer") because of his unusual nimbleness.

=== Spiritual life ===
In-sequence, he was the nineteenth one to undergo the Pahul and be baptized into the Khalsa order on Vaisakhi of 1699 in Anandpur.

=== Military career ===
Alam Singh fought in the Battle of Anandpur (1695) against the Khanzada Rustam Khan. Rustam Khan crossed the Sutlej with his troops at night, about midnight, but was spotted by Alam Singh. He immediately informed the guru and a fierce battle ensued, with the Sikhs defeating Rustam Khan.

During June 1699 in the Battle of Anandpur (1699), two hill rajas named Alim Chand and Balia Chand ambushed the Guru when he was hunting. Alam Chand lost his right hand and fled from the battlefield. Alam Singh Nachna showed “bravery and courage”. He was the one who cut the hand of Alam Chand.

In the first siege of Anandpur, Raja Ghumand Chand of Kangra attacked Anandpur Sahib. His horse was shot by Alam Singh while he himself was killed by Bhai Himmat Singh.

In the Second Battle of Anandpur (1704), Alam Singh was given the command of a 500 strong garrison in Agampur Fort. On the evacuation of the town, he along with Bhai Daya Singh and Bhai Udai Singh led the vanguard. Alam Singh advanced far beyond the Sikh line of defence, making himself vulnerable to the enemy whom came to surround him. In the heat of battle, he was captured by the hostile forces and became a prisoner of war. According to Sikh lore, Alam Singh had bore the Nishan Sahib as a flag-bearer, after taunts and remarks exchanged with the local Mughal commander regarding the flag, Alam Singh was executed by beheading.

=== Martyrdom ===
In the Battle of Chamkaur, the Guru sent his son, Ajit Singh, to fight. He took 5 men with him, one of them being Alam Singh. He is said to have fought, “fiercely, bravely, and with much valour.” Alam Singh with the other Sikhs killed many Mughal soldiers. He fought until his last breath.

== See also ==
- Nihang
- Martyrdom and Sikhism
