= Naina Singh (Jathedar) =

Akali Naina Singh Nihang
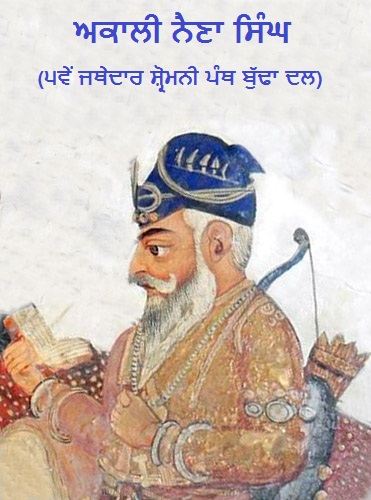
- Jathedar Akali Baba Naina Singh Nihang
- Born: Narayan Singh c. 1736; Khudi Khurd, Barnala
- Known for: Fifth Jathedar of Budha Dal
- Predecessor: Jassa Singh Ahluwalia
- Successor: Akali Phula Singh

Naina Singh (fl. 18th century), also known as Narayan Singh, (Note: Alternatively spelt as 'Narain'.) was a Nihang warrior and fifth Jathedar of Budha Dal and a chief of the Shaheedan Misl during the late 18th century.

== Biography ==
=== Early life ===
Very little is known or can be assured about the early life of Naina Singh. He was born as Narayan Singh around 1736 in Khudi Kurd located in Barnala district. According to Harbans Singh, he must have been alive in or before 1734, the year Baba Darbara Singh died, because Naina Singh had received the Pahul rites under the supervision of Darbara Singh.

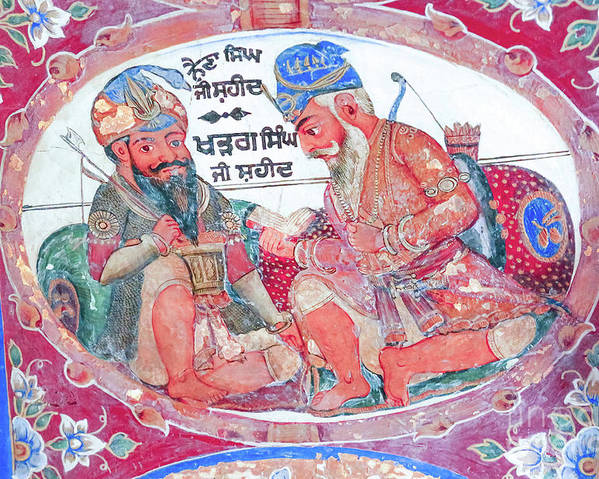
Fresco of Kharag Singh (left) and Naina Singh (right) from Gurdwara Baba Atal

He was also caretaker of Darbar Sahib. He learned Gurbani and martial skills from Baba Deep Singh. He became associated with the Shaheedan Misl. He joined Budha Dal at the age of 20, along with his nephew Nihang Kharag Singh. Within the Shaheedan Misl, he rose to the ranks of a junior leader headquartered at Damdama Sahib in Talwandi Sabo, located in modern-day Bathinda district.

Naina Singh is believed to have been talented performer of kirtan music.

He became acquainted with a Sikh of the Nishanwalia Misl named Ishar Singh, developing a friendship.

=== Adoption of Phula Singh ===
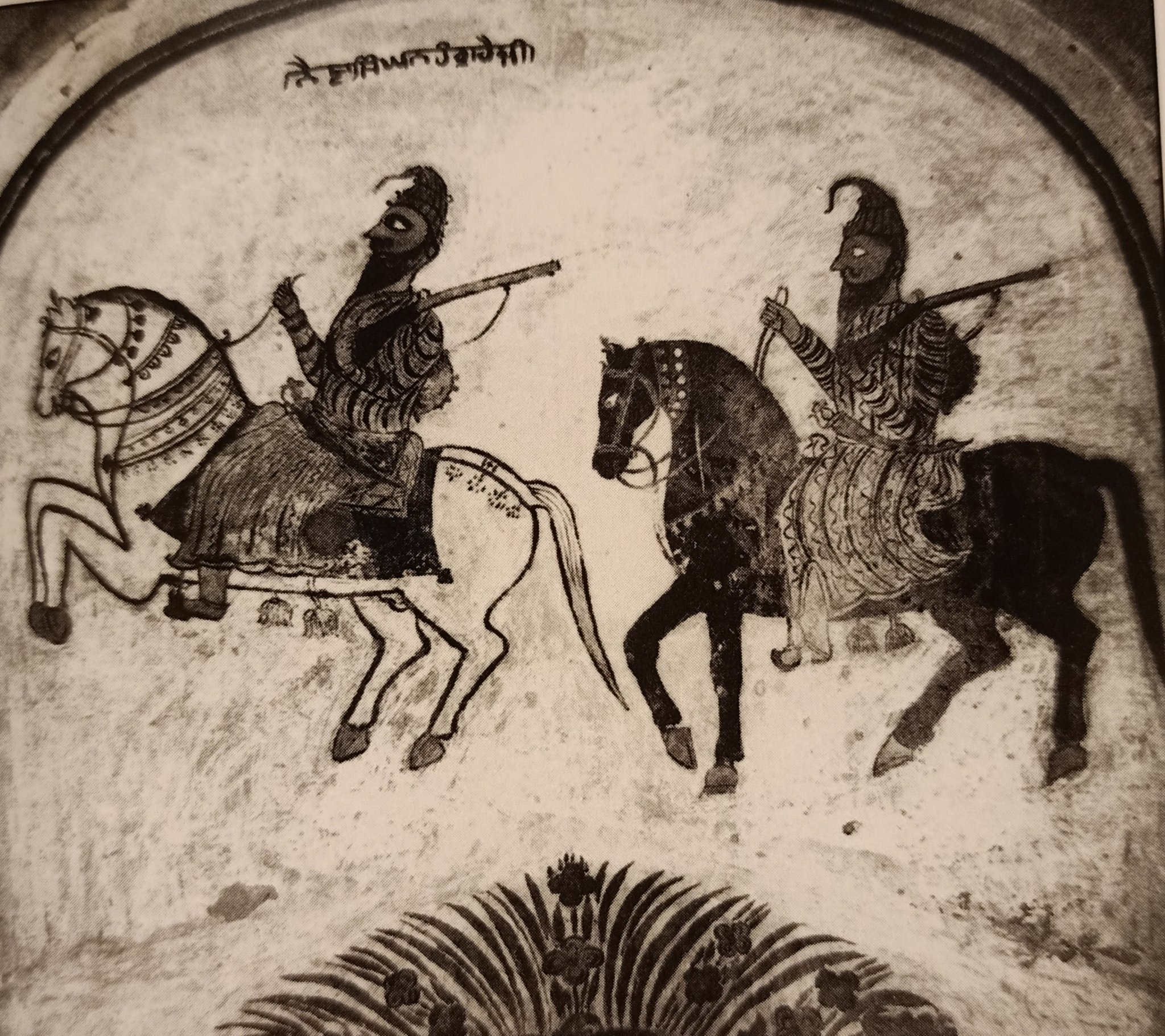
Fresco of Akali Naina Singh from Gurdwara Akalgarh Sahib, Dina, Punjab

During battle in-which the Nishanwalia and Shaheedan misls jointly partook in, Ishar Singh became mortally wounded. Ishar Singh was the father of two sons, with the elder child named Phula Singh. On his dying breath in the battlefield, Ishar Singh granted custodianship over his two sons to Naina Singh and requested the latter to take care of them. Naina Singh would take the two infants to Damdama Sahib and raise them.

He was guardian of Akali Phula Singh (1761-1823) and trained him with scriptures, warfare and martial arts. Bhai Naina Singh, the uncle and the predecessor of Akali Phula Singh used Akali as a prefix of his name.

=== Influence on clothing ===
The unique aspects of the Nihang sect's clothing is attributed to Naina Singh traditionally. He is credited for introducing the tall pyramidal turban, which is common among the Nihangs. As per Nihang lore, Naina Singh wanted to wear a large and tall turban to help make him more recognizable to his fellow warriors of his Misl, since he held the flag-bearer role in the Misl.

=== Later life and successor ===
In his later life, he moved to Bharpurgarh village located near Amloh in present-day Patiala district. He was succeeded by his disciple, Phula Singh, as the next chief of the Shaheedan Misl. His successor Phula Singh became even more popular as an Akali.

== Legacy ==
A gurdwara located in Bharpurgarh claims to possess clothing and musical instrument relics of Naina Singh, which they display to visitors.
