= Akali Phula Singh =

Prominent Sikh leader

Shaheed Akali Phula Singh
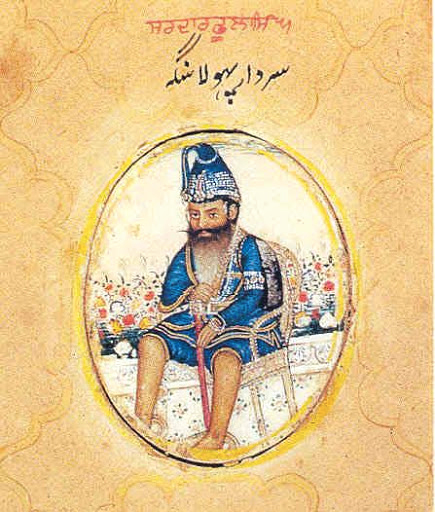
- Portrait of Akali Phula Singh

Jathedar of the Akal Takht
- In office 1800–1823
- Preceded by: Jassa Singh Ahluwalia
- Succeeded by: Hanuman Singh

6th Jathedar of Buddha Dal
- In office 1800–1823
- Preceded by: Naina Singh
- Succeeded by: Hanuman Singh

Personal details
- Born: Phula Singh; 14 January 1761 Shihan, Phulkian Misl, Sikh Confederacy (present-day Sangrur district, Punjab, India)
- Died: 14 March 1823 (aged 62) Pir Sabaq, Sikh Empire (present-day Khyber Pakhtunkhwa, Pakistan)
- Cause of death: Killed in Action
- Parent: Isher Singh (father)

Akali Phula Singh Nihang (born Phula Singh; 14 January 1761 – 14 March 1823) was an Akali Nihang Sikh leader. He was a saint soldier of the Khalsa Shaheedan Misl and head of the Budha Dal in the early 19th century. He was also a senior general in the Sikh Khalsa Army and commander of the irregular Nihang of the army. He played a role in uniting Sikh misls in Amritsar. He was not afraid of the British who at many times ordered for his arrest but were not successful. During his later years he served the Sikh Empire as a direct adviser to Maharaja Ranjit Singh. He remained an army general in many famous Sikh battles up until his martyrdom in the battle of Nowshera. He was admired by the local people and had a great influence over the land and his settlement was always open to help the poor and helpless. He was well known and was a humble unique leader and prestigious warrior with high character. He was also known for his effort to maintain the values of Gurmat and the Khalsa panth.

== Early life ==
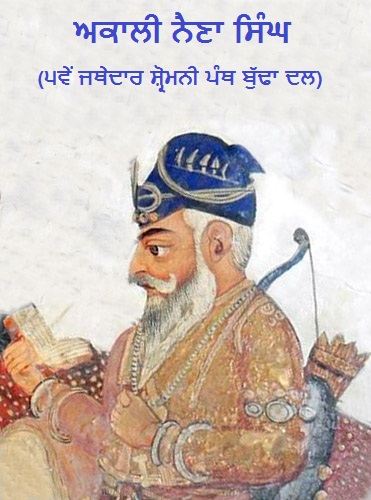
Akali Baba Naina Singh taught Akali Phula Singh from around the age of ten.

Akali Phula Singh was born in 1761 in a Jat family, to father Sardar Ishar Singh. After his father's death Akali Phula Singh, who was still young, and his elder brother, Baba Sant Singh, were taken care of by Mahant Balram and under his mother's advice he would later be taken under the apprenticeship of Akali Baba Naina Singh, the leader of the Shaheedan Misl, and his Nihang order at Anandpur Sahib. It was from Baba Naina Singh that he would receive initiation into the Khalsa.

Akali Phula Singh memorized the Nitnem (The writings of the Sikh Gurus which are recited daily by a Sikh) at a young age. As a child he would not eat until he completed memorizing a certain portion of the Sikh Guru's writings and in this way he had the Akal Ustat, 33 Savaiye, and other Sri Mukhwak Bani memorized. Around the age of fourteen Akali Phula Singh's mother also passes away after falling off stairs leaving him with the dying wishes of being virtuous, upholding dharma, helping the poor, serving the Panth, in the heart being at the refuge of the Guru, being unaffected by Moh, being a role model on the battlefield, and following the footsteps of his ancestors. This had a great impact on Akali Phula Singh who then gave away his land and his possessions to the poor to start to live the life of a Nihang Saint Soldier. He became very close to Akali Naina Singh's jatha at Anandpur Sahib where he completed his martial arts training and fought many battles. As he began to recite Gurbani with a near perfect pronunciation and began to display great dharmic strength he was made the jathedar of the Shaheedan Misl. He did considerable Seva at Anandpur Sahib which included protecting the Gurdwara from thieves and preparation of langar until eventually the Gurdwara was reformed.

== Stay in Amritsar ==
=== The Jathedar of Amritsar ===
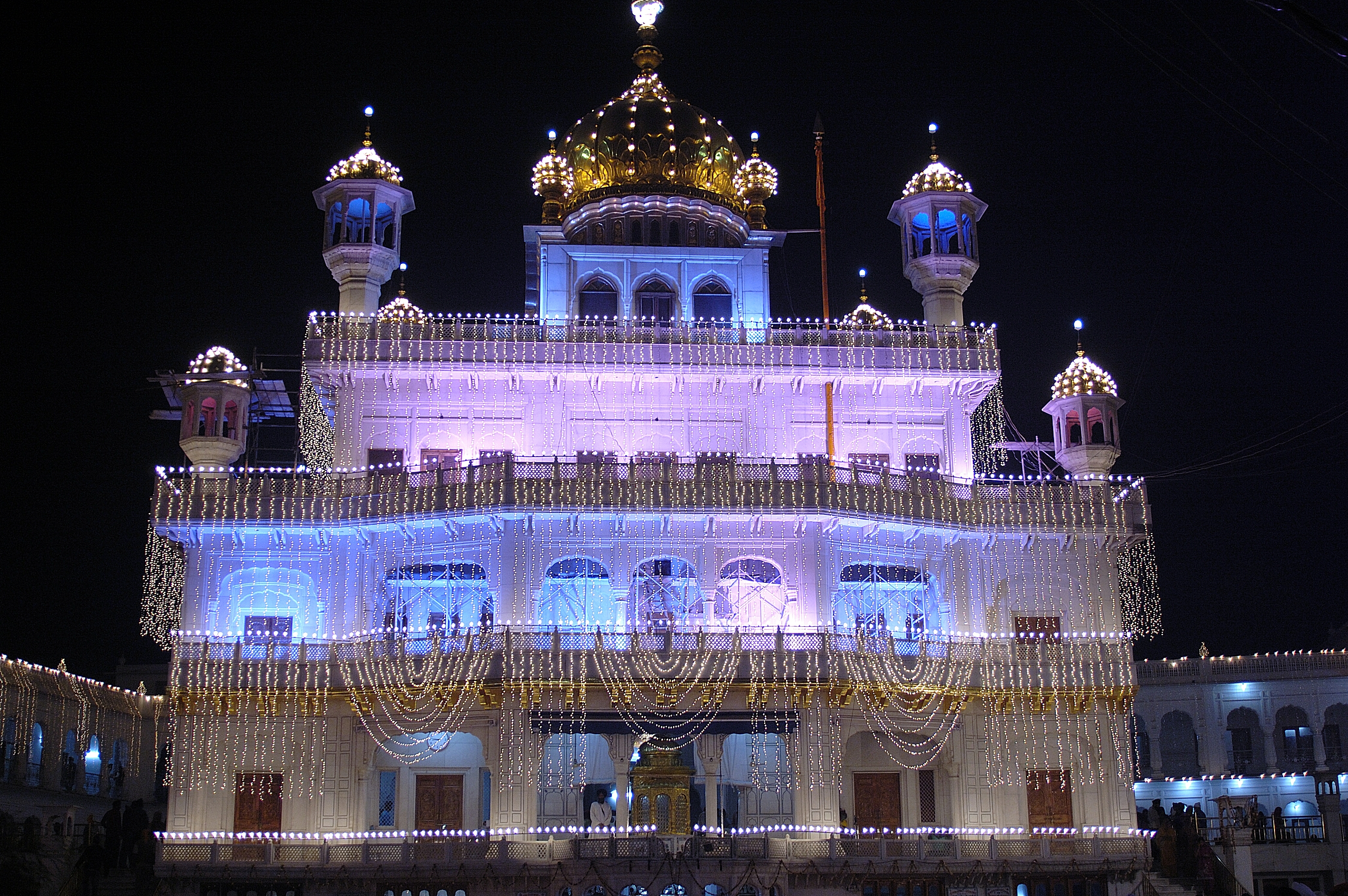
The Akal Bunga (Akal Takht), Amritsar became the headquarters of the Akali jatha.

Upon hearing of news of lack of maintenance and other neglect by sevadars of the Gurdwaras in Amritsar Akali Phula Singh came to Amritsar in 1800 at this time he had under his leadership a band of about 2,000 Nihangs. He stopped the mismanagement and actively began reforming many Gurdwaras within Amritsar to the point he became responsible and accepted as being in charge of the maintenance of all Gurdwaras in the area. He did Kar Seva at the holy sorawar at Harmindar Sahib and overall cleaning of the complex with the help of about 100,000 pilgrims this lasted for about 2 months. Later in his life he made similar improvements to Sri Muktsar Sahib, Anandpur Sahib, and Damdama Sahib. Seeing Akali Phula Singh's high character and dedication, the Sangat made him the Jathedar of the Akal Takht which was initiated by the Panj Pyare.

==== Meeting the Maharaja Ranjit Singh ====
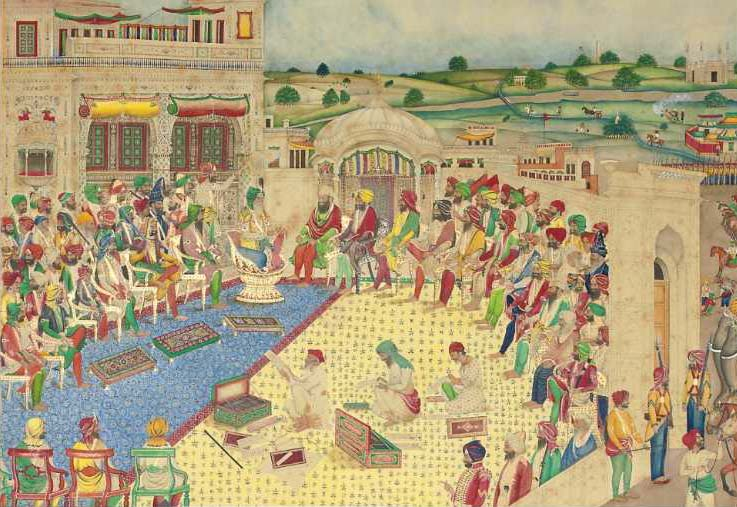
Akaki Phula Singh remained a prominent member of the court of Maharajah Ranjit Singh.

At the beginning of the nineteenth century Amritsar was ruled by the Bhangi Misl under Mai Sukhan and other Sikhs Sardars. Ranjit Singh of the Sukerchakia Misl had recently acquired the capital of Punjab, Lahore. When he approached Amritsar wanting to add it to his empire it created a problem for the ruling families of the city. In 1801 Maharaja Ranjeet Singh brought his army and the Bhangi Misl fortified Amritsar preparing for battle. There was a brief shelling where Ranjit Singh fired empty rounds into the sky in the respect of the holy city. Akali Phula Singh saw this and was saddened by the event and right when the battle was imminent he intervened between the two Sikh forces in the middle of the battlefield. He said that it was a sin for a Sikh to kill another Sikh and it was also a sin to fire cannons in Amritsar and succeeded in persuading them to stop fighting. The two parties made peace under Akali Phula Singh's advice. Ranjit Singh asked Akali Phula Singh to join his forces and he agreed, Akali Phula Singh with him added about 2,000 to 3,000 Nihangs to join the government army. Many of Ranjit Singh's future victories would be due to Akali Phula Singh and his army.

== Military career ==
=== Battle of Kasur ===
Kasur falls in fairly close proximity to Lahore and there were many Pathan-Sikh wars fought earlier between the two neighbouring empires. Previously Emperor Nizamuddin Khan agreed after battle to subdue to the Sikh empire. Nizamuddin however then broke his vow and was defeated again with Ranjit Singh forgiving him once again allowing Nizamuddin to control Kasur again. The next Nawab of Kasur and Nizamuddin son, Qutbuddin Khan, was mistreating the Sikhs and Hindus in his state and charging extra tax on them he eventually called a Jihad on the Sikh Kingdom. In February 1807 Qutbuddin Khan with the help of the Multan Nawab, Musafar Khan, gathered thousands of soldiers in Kasur where there was a big fort. Akali Phula Singh and his jatha were called to Lahore by Maharaja Ranjit Singh to fight in Kasur, Jodh Singh Ramgarhia and Hari Singh Nalwa were also called in. Akali Phula Singh and his soldiers led the attack on the Muslim Ghazis on the morning of 10 February 1807. Two battles were fought outside the city and the Singhs won both. Qutbuddin retreated to his fort as he had nowhere to go.

For one full month the Sikh cannons fired at the walls of the fort. The Sikh Army broke a hole through in a section of the wall by putting gunpowder underneath the fort doors. Akali Phula Singh and his Nihangs were the first to charge through the breach and after hand-to-hand fighting the Sikhs gained victory. Qutbuddin tried to run away but was soon caught. After begging for mercy Maharaja Ranjit Singh forgave him and give the Nawab a jagir of land at Mamdot, near the Sutlej River and Lahore. Kasur was made a part of Ranjit Singhs empire. After this battle Akali Phula Singh gained affection from Ranjit Singh and Akali Phula Singh became a reliable military ally. The Nihang jatha was large now and they got a jagir for Langar. At this time Akali Phula Singh and his Akalis used to ask for weapons and horses from the local leaders and if they were not given they would take them by force themselves. This stopped after Ranjit Singh gave them permission to take whatever they required from the Sikh Empire's army barracks.

=== Encounter with Charles Metcalfe ===
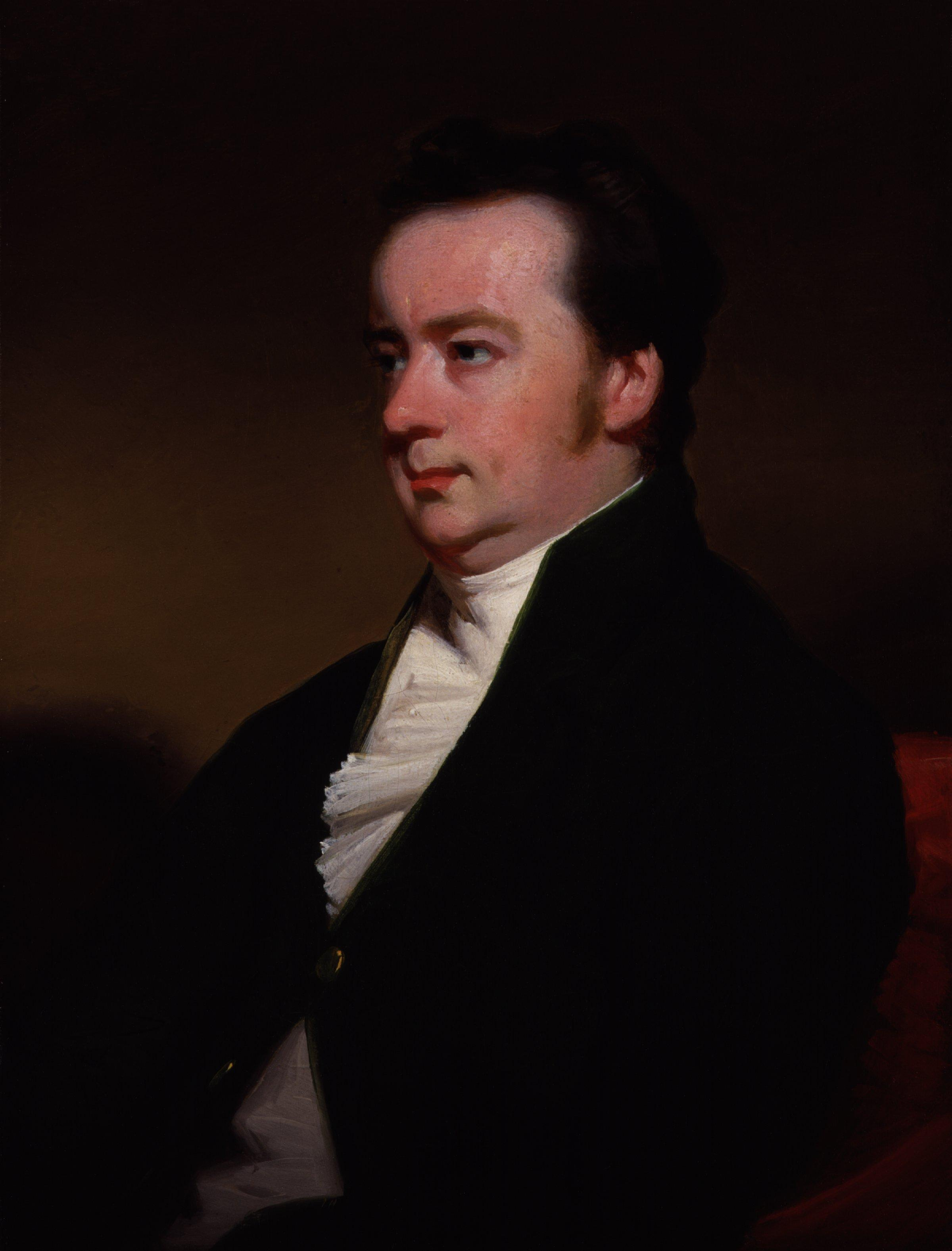
Charles Metcalfe, circa 1820

The British Civil servant Charles Metcalfe met with Ranjit Singh at Kasur and then in February 1809 arrived in Amritsar to go to Ranjit Singh's court for the signing of the Treaty of Amritsar. Metcalfe was interested in the creation of the pastili boundary and establishing an English treaty made by suffledge where boundaries will be respected between British and Sikh empires. Metcalfe came with his platoon who were composed of entirely Shia Muslims. It was the Shia Muslims commemoration of Muharram and they took it upon themselves to enact this ritual in the streets of Amritsar. The army of about 100 Muslim soldiers began beating their breasts to the chants of "Hassan, Hussein, Ali" and making much noise as they came near the Harmindar Sahib complex where Akali Phula Singh and his jatha were staying.

Akali Phula Singh who was participating in the Kirtan when he heard the noise he sent three Akali Nihangs to inquire what is going on. When the Nihangs approached the Shia group and explained that they are disturbing the sacred hymns and atmosphere of the Gurdwara they were insulted by the Shia Muslims and a confrontation took place in which one of the turbans of the Nihangs fell to the ground. Akali Phula Singh on hearing this news came to the Muslims. With a few Nihangs he confronted and attacked the Muslims and shots were fired at their procession. Maharaja Ranjit Singh heard of the battle going on and arrived however he could not stop the rowdy Nihangs and it was after some time that the violence quelled. Akali Phula Singh killed and wounded a large amount of the Muslims and made them apologize and agree to not make noise near the Gurdwara again. It was likely the entire platoon would have been killed if it weren't for Mahraja Ranjit Singh conveying to the Akalis to stop the fighting. Maharaja sent the Muslims back to their camp and went to meet Metcalfe where he was staying. He explained the situation and how most of Metcalfe's army was killed because of the Akali's perceived disrespect to the turban. This entire complication was settled that day and the treaty was written the next day.

=== Stay at Shri Damdama Sahib ===
==== Attacking a British Regiment ====
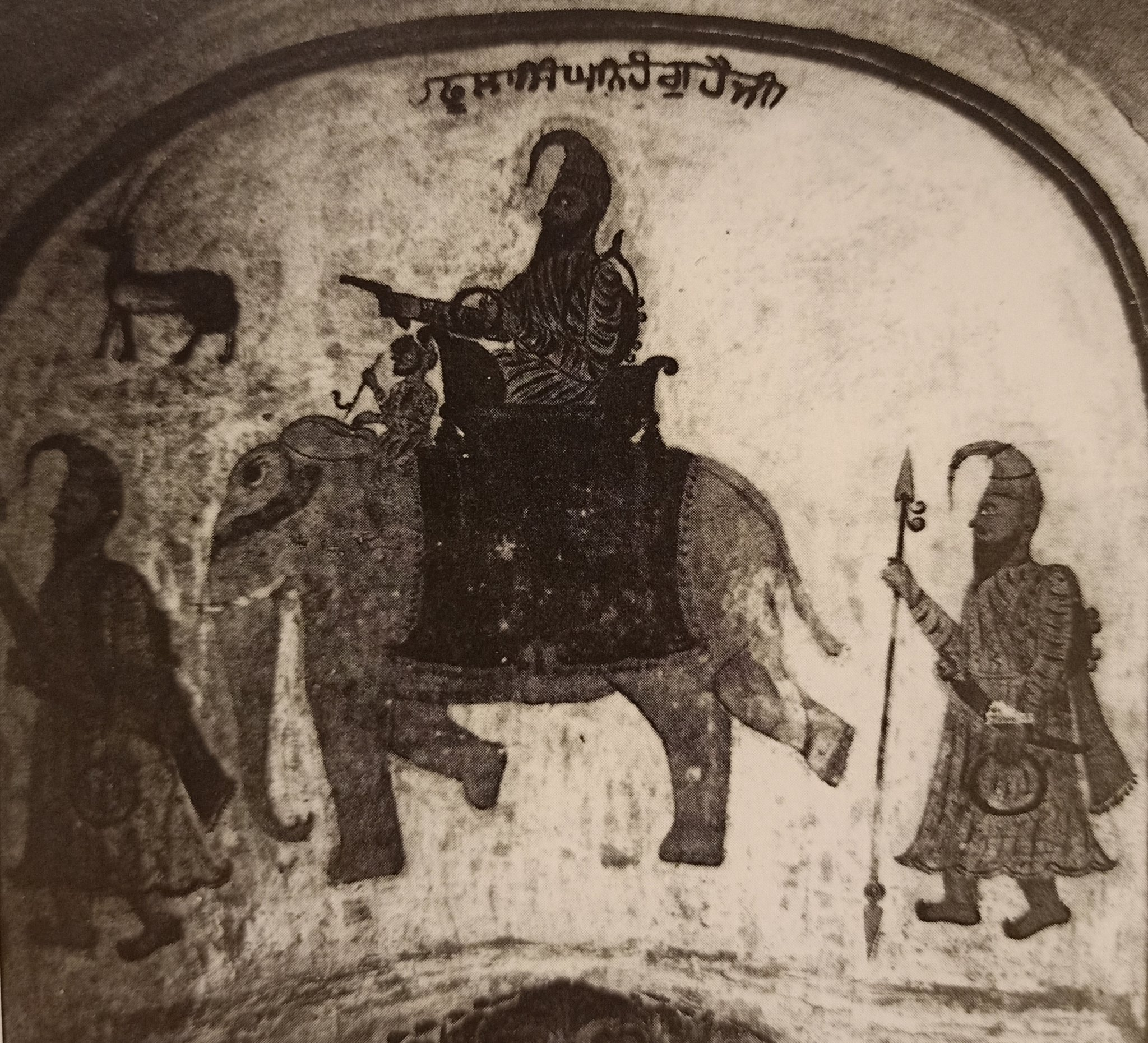
Fresco of Akali Phoola Singh on elephant from Gurdwara Akalgarh Sahib, Dina, Punjab

After the Amritsar Treaty was accepted, the British Officer Captain White was sent to Punjab to survey the border line between the British and Sikh Raj. He got permission from Maharaja Ranjit Singh to set camp at that spot where he rested however he did not tell the local people what he was doing there. Around 1799 Akali Phula Singh arrived at Damdama Sahib for maintenance of Gurdwaras in the area and the starting of Gurbani recitation samagam. Here he heard the news that there was a British Regiment who wanted to capture neighboring land and were preparing maps nearby. It was also said that Captain White was mistreating the local people and displaying poor conduct. The Nihangs could not bear the British forces trying to enter Punjab for any reason.

Akali Phula Singh with an army of hundreds of Nihangs arrived at the campsite of the British Regiment. Without negating or explaining the situation the British Regiment took out their arms and prepared for conflict. The British regiment of about 150 soldiers were quickly defeated besides the commanding officer the entire regiment ran off to a different village. The Nihangs looted their tents and tore up their maps. Captain White's army suffered 6 soldiers casualties and 20 wounded. While the situation was occurring news was told to Raja Jaswant Singh of Nabha who then sent his nephew to explain the situation to Akali Phula Singh. The British again issued a warrant for the arrest of Akali Phula Singh.

=== Advice for the Maharajah ===
==== Disapproval of Europeanisation of the Sikh Army ====
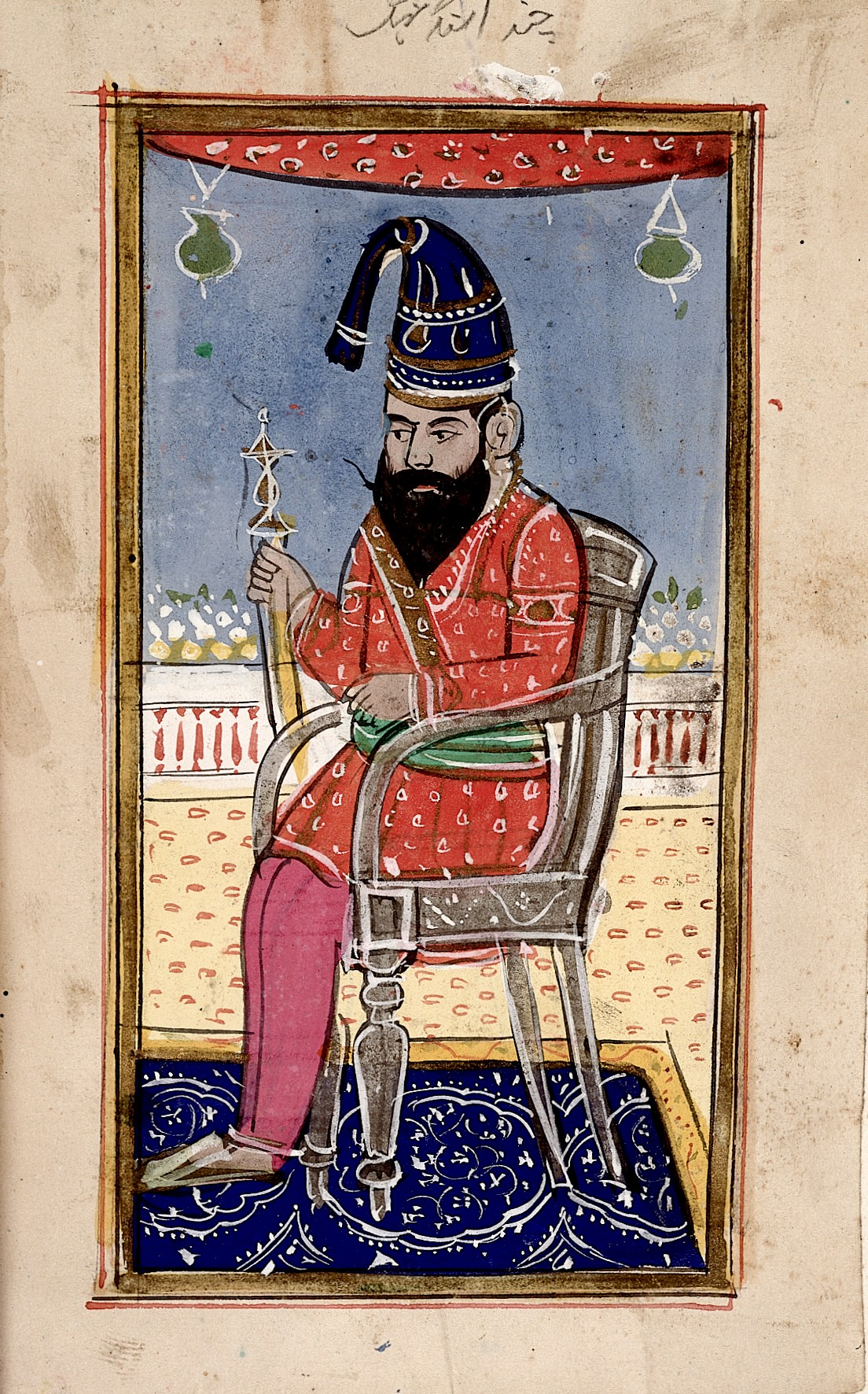
Akali Phula Singh. gouache, with oxidised gold

Akali Phula Singh did not like that Maharajah Ranjit Singh replaced the Bani (Language) and Bana (Clothing) of the traditional Sikh appearance blessed by the Sikh gurus, as the national army military drills were now being done in French and the traditional Bana dress was replaced with European clothing. Akali Phula Singh disapproved the treaty that Ranjit Singh created with the British Raj as he had wanted the Sikh Empire to retake all of India from the British. The Maharajah then calmed the warrior by telling him they would first subdue the Punjab, Kashmir and Tibet before taking on the British. Akali Phula Singh was also strongly against the Dogras holding any position in the government and wanted every on to be Khalsa as per Guru Gobind Singh's 52 Hukams.

=== Stay at Anandpur Sahib ===
Akali Phula Singh got into conflict with the Dogra courtiers and Brahmin officials and blamed them for causing distress and damage to Sikh Government. The courtiers were also opposing Prince Kharak Singh and Prince Sher Singh. They made it hard for Akali Phula Singh to meet with the Maharaja Ranjit Singh nor did they tell the Maharaja Ranjit Singh his requests. Akali Phula Singh admitted himself into the fort where Ranjit Singh was without the Dogra Officials or Brahmin Officials permission. He tried to persuade the Maharajah to abandon the corrupt Dogras and corrupt Brahmanis but Ranjit Singh refused. He stated that to Ranjit Singh that he was not inline with Sikhi and Gurmat and not respecting the Sikh empire that was given to him by the blessing of Maharajah Guru Gobind Singh and thus he is not happy living under this rule and with this he left Ranjit Singh. In 1814 Akali Phula Singh left his Nihanghan di Chhaoni in Amritsar and arrived in Anandpur Sahib, which was near British land and the British did not like this and saw him as a major threat. Akali Phula Singh and his Shaheedan Misl opened up a dera here.

==== Protection of Kanowar Partap ====
In 1813 prince Kanowar Partap of Jind acquired the Kingdom of Jind from his father's will. However, the will was not accepted by the British government. Kanowar Partap revolted by taking the Jind fort over and thus the British wanted him captured. Under distress along with his father the prince came at the refuge of Akali Phula Singh's camp in Anandpur. The British sent an order to Akali Phula Singh and wanted him to send back the prince so he could be arrested or else prepare for war.

Akali Phula Singh refused to break his vow to protect the prince and maintained that under the ideals of the Khalsa it was a sin for the Khalsa to refuse someone who has come for help and then relies on you to fix the problem.

The British messaged Ranjit Singh asking him for his help on the troublesome Jathadar and wanted to remove him from the near proximity of British territory. The Dogras and Brahmins courtiers sent a reply from the Sikh Government to try to arrest Akali Phula Singh and thus Diwan Moti Ram's army was sent to arrest Akali Phula Singh. However, when the army arrived each soldier refused their orders and refrained to proceed with the action out of respect for Akali Phula Singh. Ram Kud Singh's army was paid to attack Akali Phula Singh but they laid down their weapons saying they cannot attack this great holy man. A similar attempt happened a second time on British requests to Raja Jaswant Singh of Nabha and their requests to Nawab of Malerkotla to subdue Akali Phula Singh. When Jaswant Singh Nabha forces arrived they laid down their weapons saying they won't attack. Finally Ranjit Singh sent the saint Baba Sahib Singh Bedi to bring back Akali Phula Singh to Amritsar and tell him he was sorry about his conduct and that all of Akali Phula Singhs plans will slowly implemented into the Government. Thus Akali Phula Singh returned to Amritsar and on his return he received 50 horses, two elephants, weapons, and wealth from the Maharajah. Akali Phula Singhs army of 3,000 Nihangs were given a newly constructed building under the title of Nihang Choni to stay, and more wealth and a jagir for their sewa of langar.

=== Battle of Multan ===
Maharajah Ranjit Singh fought numerous battles in Multan from 1802 to 1818. In 1805 Muzaffar Khan Sadozi stopped paying taxes to the Sikh Kingdom but eventually after military defeat agreed to pay them this happened again and again at a few different occasions through the years. The last battle of 1818 is of prime significance when Muzaffar Khan again stopped paying taxes and finally flew the Jihad flag against Khalsa and called the Muslims of the adjoining territories of help. The 25,000 Sikh soldiers sent to Multan were led by Hari Singh Nalwa with Mokham Chand secondary in charge. Akali Phula Singh and the Shaheedan Dal along with the reinforcements of Nihung under Sadhu Singh and the power of Zamzama Bhangianwala Toap played a big role in this battle and was inspiration for the Sikh soldiers to fight bravery.

The Sikhs begin preparing for the battle in January 1818 and the battle was fought from March to June later that year. The Indus River was used to transport heavy artillery. Akali Phula Singh brought his jatha and joined the Sikh army soon after Kharak Singh also bought his forces. Prince Kharak Singh urged Akali Phula Singh to rest but Akali Phula Singh disagreed and said we will properly rest after taking over the fort. Muzaffar Khan had about 13,000 troops inside the famous Multan Fort. The Sikhs first captured Khangarh and Muzaffargarh. The Sikhs then besieged the Multan fort. Arrangements were made for an appeal to stop the war and to give Muzaffar jagirship elsewhere but Muzaffar backed out at the final stages. There was rally of many attacks from the Sikh heavy guns but each time the breaches were quickly filled by the Afghans. Hundreds of Sikhs continued to lose their lives as battle prevailed. At a time of rest Sadhu Singh Akali dashed near a breach in the wall killed the Pathan guards and entered the fort. Shouting Sat Sri Akal the other Sikh soldiers rushed behind him. Hand to hand sword fighting now was striking inside the fort.

Muzaffar Khan and five of his sons were killed while his remaining two sons were imprisoned and then later given 2,400 rupees and a large piece of land near Sukherpaur. The Sikh army suffered about 1,900 casualties and 12,000 Muslims were killed by 4,000 Sikhs. Multan was incorporated into the Sikh empire. This victory meant that there was no longer any Afghan presence in Punjab and also the Sikhs gained a major centre of trade. Maharaja Ranjit celebrated for eight days and freely distributed wealth throughout both Lahore and Amritsar. Akali Phula Singh fought so hard that when he returned his hand swelled up so much that his sword handle was stuck to his hand and had to be removed with great difficulty only upon his return. He also had to stitch up some minor war wounds, but quickly recovered.

=== Advancement to Attock ===
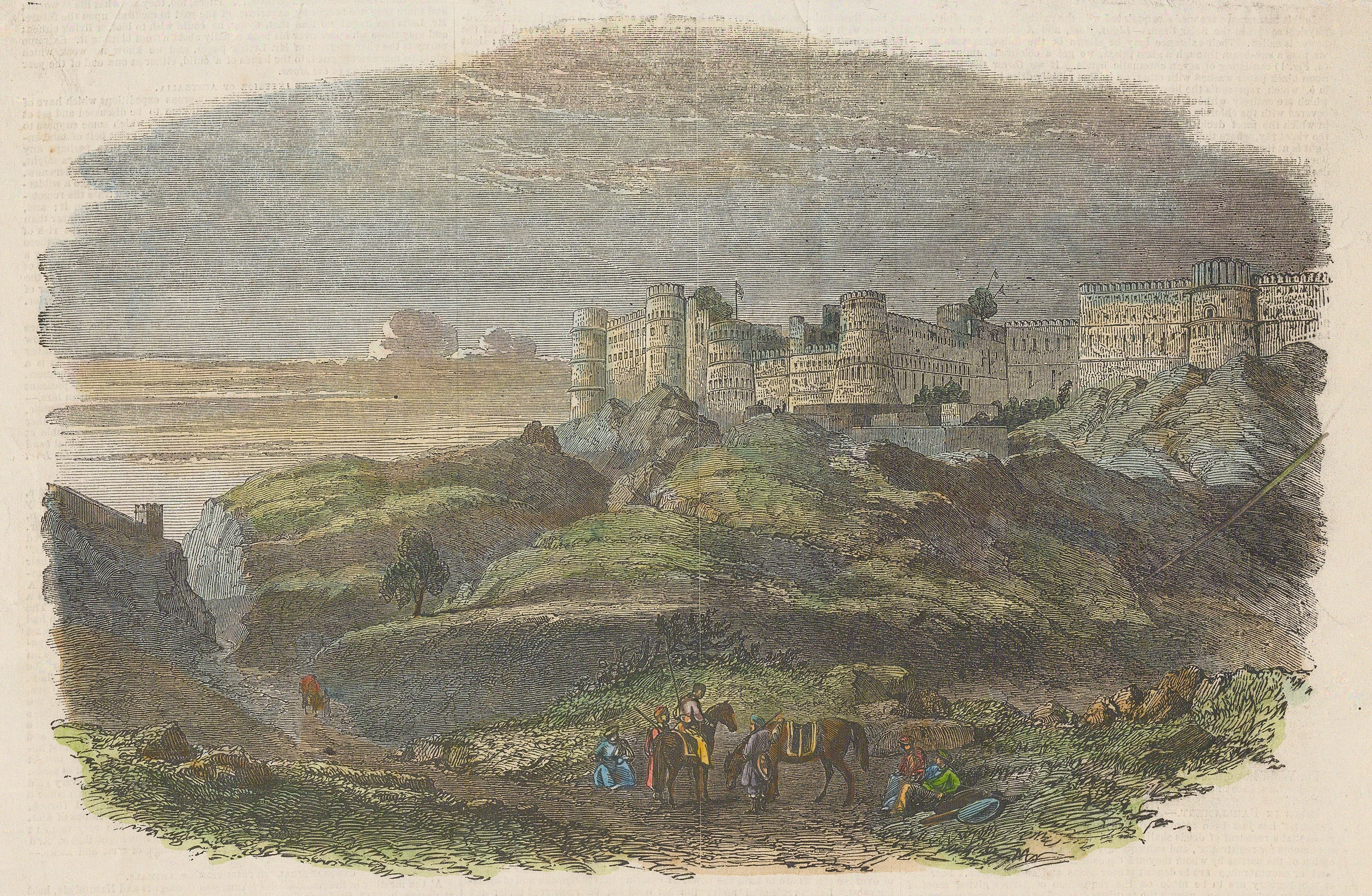
The Attock Fort

Upon the assassination of Fateh Khan and the civil disruption that evaded the Kabul region Maharaja Ranjit Singh took advantage of the situation and advanced his army to Attock in October 1818. The Maharaja himself led the expedition to bring the rebellious Pathans under control. A bridge of boats was constructed across the river Attock and a small jatha was sent to assess the situation, but the jatha was attacked. This enraged the Maharaja. He sent Akali Phula Singh and general Hari Singh Nalwa to fight against the rebels. As soon as the Sikh army was within firing range, they were showered with a rain of bullets. Akali Phula Singh ordered a tactical retreat. This coaxed the rebels from their bunkers to expel the retreating Sikhs. When the enemy was in the open battlefield, Akali Phula Singh ordered a severe attack and then encircled them. Their commander Feroze Khan accepted his defeat and requested the Sikhs to end the battle. The rulers of Khatkha surrendered themselves to the Khalsa forces and thus were spared. The next day, the remaining Khalsa army and Maharaja Ranjit came across the river and camped there. Small contingents were stationed in the forts of Khairabad and Jahangira. The Sikh army then proceeded towards Peshawar.

=== Takeover of the Kashmir Suba ===
Kashmir was a territory that Maharajah Ranjit Singh wanted to capture for some time but never had the opportunity to do so. In 1819 upon hearing the news of the Kashmir people under distress from Pandit Birbal Dhar Ranjit, Singh decided to invade the region. The Sikh forces first attacked Aziz Khan who had broken the terms of the treaty with the Khalsa raj. After a short battle Aziz Khan submitted to the Sikh forces and gave directions and information about the Kashmir region for their upcoming expedition. Special care was taken to ensure that the people of Kashmir were not harmed during the conflict. The people of Kashmir were unaccustomed to such hospitality and preservation of their property from foreign invaders.

The Nihangs played a special role in this battle and after trekking through rough terrain and leaving their horses behind the Akali jatha reached Bayram Gela. They met with the rulers of the area. Meer Mohamand Khan and Mohamand Ali Khan submitted to the Khalsa empire however Jabardast Khan refused to submit and join the empire and prepared for war. The Sikhs quickly attacked and besieged Jabardast Khan's fort. They destroyed the doors with gunpowder. Using their swords, the Akalis attacked the Pathans. Chenkhar Khan and his soldiers were arrested and after taking complete control of the fort, the Akalis left the area, leaving a few Singhs stationed behind. After a few days of rest they prepared to take over Peer Punchal using a variety of routes and roads.

When the Pathans learned that the Akali army was wandering through the area they brought out their armies and blocked off both sides of the mountains on the route. Upon arriving on the scene both sides began to fire at each other but since the Pathans were on higher ground, the Sikh firing was ineffective. Akali Phula Singh ordered his troops to ascend the mountain. Upon ascent, the enemies attacked and a sword battle ensued until night. On nightfall the Pathans fled from the mountain. The Akalis set up their campsite as well as a fire atop the mountain and departed forwards in the morning. Then the Akalis reached Saria Ali and met with the rest of the Sikh army via the Pir Panjal Range route.

=== Battle of Shopian ===
From the town of Saria Ali the Sikhs learned Jabbardast Khan gathered an army of 5,000 Afghani Soldiers and blocked of the route to Shopian. Dewan Mokham Chand told his plans on how to approach the upcoming battle. On 29th Harh (Bikrami Samat) they attacked the enemy from both sides with gunfire. The Sikhs then began to squeeze the enemy closer and closer from both sides. The Afghanis were able to attack Dewan Chand's regiment and took from him 3 cannons. Akali Phula Singh when he saw Diwan Chand backing up and the Afghanis charging forward advanced his jatha from the right side for a quick sword to sword combat attack, though Jabardast fought bravely the Afghani army could not bear the Akali's attack and ran away. All the Afghani war supplies fell to the hands of the Sikhs these supplies included food stock, cannons, gunpowder, weapons, and horses. The Afghanis suffered great loss in this battle in which Mehardil Khan and Meer Akoursmad Khan were killed. Jabardsast Khan was greatly injured but managed to get away. The Khalsa forces took over fort Sherghari and a few other nearby areas effectively taking over the Kashmir region.

In 1879 Srinagar was captured by the Sikh forces without the looting of the civilians. Akali Phoola Singh made a Gurdwara at Srinagar, by the name of Gurdwara Bunga Akali Phulla Singh also known as Shaheed Ganj, for the Sikhs who achieved martyrdom at the battle of Shergarhi who were also cremated here.

=== Seva at Amritsar ===
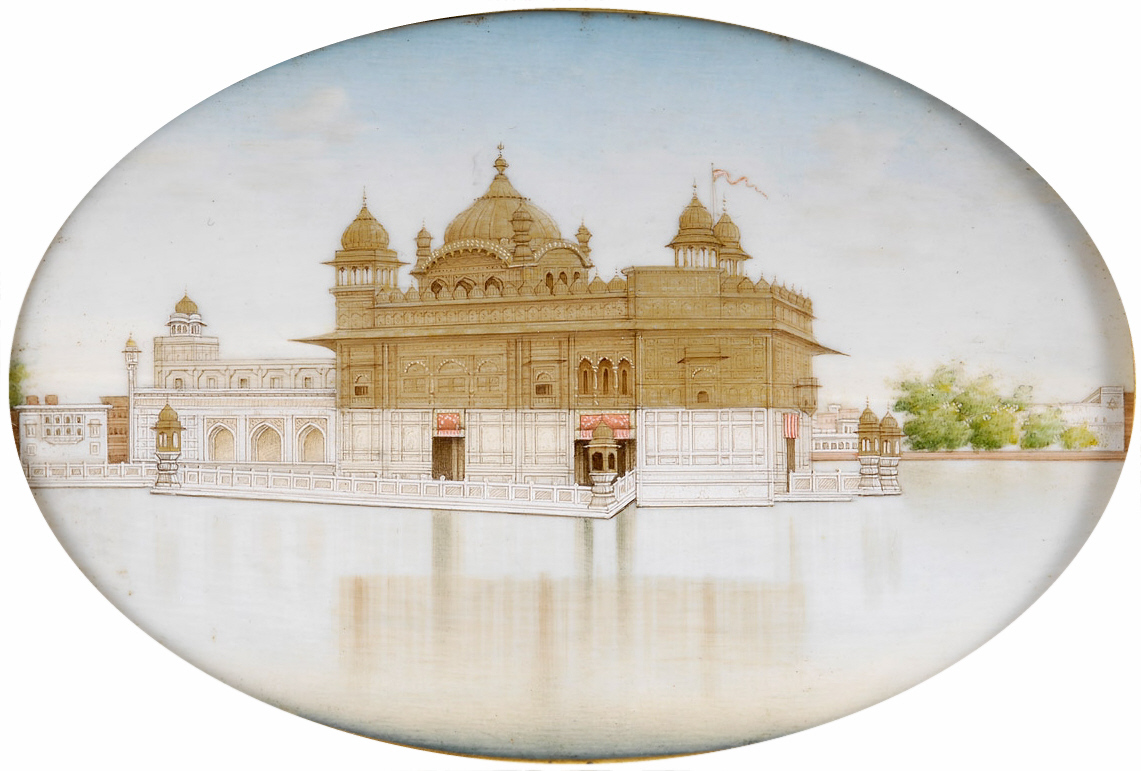
The gold on the Harmandir Sahib was placed during Akali Phoola Singh's time.

After the victory in Kashmir Maharaja Ranjit Singh had a Deep Mala of the entire city of Amritsar for three days and elaborate markets were set up. During this time Ranjit Singh began massively improving Harmandir Sahib and many other Gurdwaras in the region. When Ranjit Singh arrived in Lahore he had even bigger celebrations there, and thousands of rupees were distributed freely to the people. Later when Akali Phula Singh, General Diwan Chand, and Sahibjada Karak Singh arrived in Lahore great parades on elephants were arranged around the city, thousands of rupees were distributed again. Maharaja Ranjit Singh was very impressed by Akali Phula Singh performance and wanted him and his army to remain at the Lahore darbar but Akali Phoola Singh refused and preferred to live in Amritsar and perform administrative work. Akali Phula Singh told Ranjit Singh that though they will remain in Amritsar we will always be available when requested. In 1800, Phula Singh is attributed at carrying out the first known communal cleaning (Kar Seva) of the Amrit Sarovar of the Golden Temple complex in Amritsar.

=== Battles of Peshawar ===
==== Initial takeover of Peshawar ====
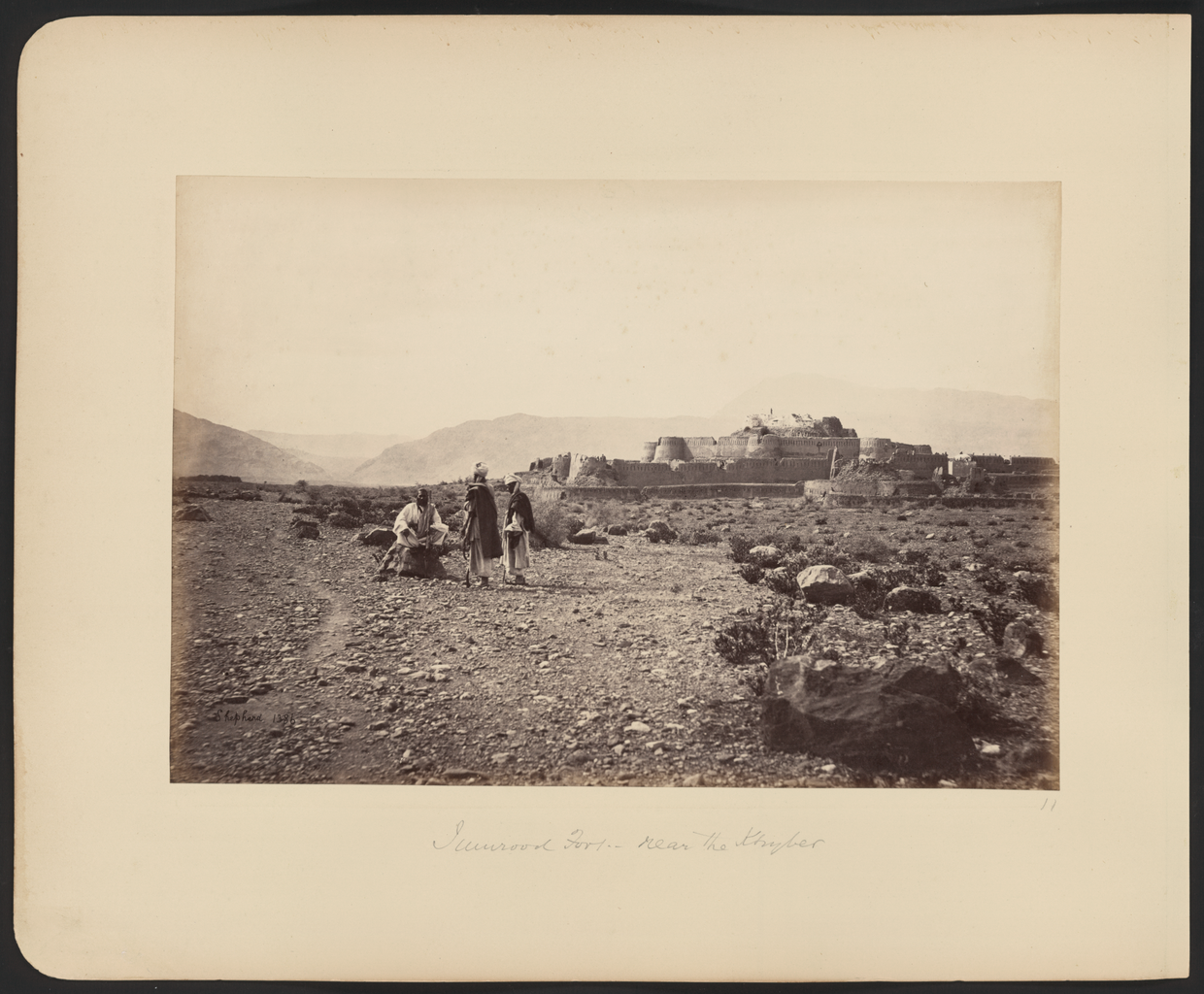
Jamrud Fort near the Khyber, 19th century

Ranjit Singh got an opportunity to try to take over the Pathan capital in 1818 after finding the Afghan frontier left open during the civil war and murder of Wazir Fateh Khan, the ruler of the Peshawar region. Initially Ranjit Singh asked Akali Phula Singh who was familiar with Attock and his surroundings for his advice regarding the situation Akali Phula Singh told him of how the Khyber Pass is used as a gateway to Punjab and a way to block alliance between Pathan and Afghani soldiers. Ranjit Singh immediately made the decision to attack. The high-ranking generals in this attack would be General Hari Singh Nalwa and Akali Phula Singh.

Sirdar Yar Mohhamand Khan and Dost Mohammad Azim Khan, the Wazir of Kabul and head of the Barakzai tribe, were in charge of the city when the Sikh army approached. They quickly fled to the Yusufzai hills. After the Sikhs took over the city it was given to Jehandad Khan However, when Ranjit Singh returned to Lahore Yar Mohammad quickly reconquered the city. Ranjit Singh almost immediately sent another expedition to Peshawar. Yar Mohammad accepted the rule of the Sikh Raj and agreed to pay a tax of Rs. 50,000 to the empire. The neighbouring cities of Darband, Mankerah, Dera Ismail Khan, and Dera Ghazi Khan were also added to the Sikh Raj.

==== Grandeur battle of Peshawar ====
In 1823 Azim Khan peacefully took over Peshawar from his brother Sirdar Yar Mohammand Khan who was under the rule of Ranjit Singh's raj. Muhammad Azim Khan declares Jihad against the Sikh empire and Islamic religious teachers motivated around 25,000 jehadi pathans to join under Mohammad Azim Khan army. Ranjit Singh preparing to recapture the ancient city sent 2,000 horsemen under Kanwar Sher Singh and Diwan Kirpa Ram to check the advance of Afghans. Another army division was sent under Hari Singh Nalwa to help the first group. Next Maharajah alongside Akali Phula Singh, Sardar Desa Singh Majithia, Sardar Fateh Singh Ahluwalia joined and reached Attock.

Sher Singh and Hari Singh crossed the Attock river via a boat bridge and took over the Jahangira fort after a small battle. Mohammad Azim Khan dispatched an army of Ghazis under Dost Muhammad Khan and Jabbar Khan to fight against the Sikhs near Jahangira. Mohammad Azim Khan also destroyed the boat bridge at Attock so Maharaja Ranjit Singh and his army would not be able to cross. Maharaja Ranjit Singh started construction of new bridge but he quickly received the news that a force of Ghazis had encircled his army across the river and the Khalsa army had a chance of being wiped out there. Maharaja Ranjit Singh ordered the army to swim across the river and the Sikh forces were successful with little loss of men and luggage and Maharaja Ranjit Singh reached Jahangira. During this time Jai Singh Attariwala who had left the Sikh Army in 1821 and joined Azim Khan came back to Ranjit Singh who instantiated him into his former rank. Here the army was strategically divided into three formations. 800 cavalry and 700 infantry soldiers was placed under Akali Phula Singh.

== Martyrdom ==
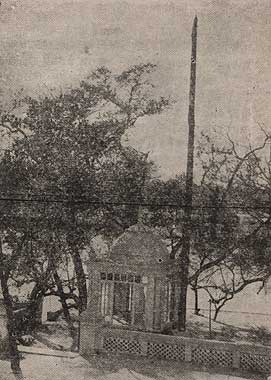
Memorial of Akali Phula Singh located in modern-day Nowshera Cantonment, Khyber Pakhtunkhwa, Pakistan

The army prepared to storm Peshawar and Sikh army come together to do an Ardas to Akal Purakh asking for their victory and to formalize their upcoming departure to the battlefield. Upon the completion of the ceremony Ranjit Singh heard news of the delay of General Ventura and the Sikh artillery and cannons so he told his army to stop and tried to tell the Nihang army to stop the planned attack. Akali Phula Singh refused to break the Khalsa's Gurmata made in the presence of Guru Granth Sahib to fight tonight and to fight to the last without turning back. He told Ranjit Singh to do what he may with his army but the Nihangs are leaving for battle now and won't turn back. The Akalis thus entered the battlefield first. The Nihangs charged at the army on horseback but when they reached the army they abandoned their horses and fought through the enemies with swords. Ranjit Singh seeing the Nihangs successful charge and also seeing how the Nihangs were outnumbered on the battlefield ordered the rest of the army to enter the battlefield. Prince Kharak Singh's army now charged at the enemy and General Ventura had now also arrived. Ranjit Singh ordered General Balu Bahadur's Gurkha army to attack the enemy from behind.

In the Upper Desh region after severe hand-to-hand combat Akali Phula Singh was wounded in the leg so he came back to fight on a horse. Whilst fighting on horse his horse got shot so he came back to the battlefield on in howdah on the elephant upon which he would be fired down and attain martyrdom. Around this time General Ventura, Hari Singh Nalwa, and Sardar Budh Singh attacked Muhammad Azim Khan's army. When the Ghazis heard that Azim Khan ran away they lost hope and were quickly defeated. The Sikhs chased away any surviving enemies and after winning the battle the news of Akali Phula Singhs death spread around the army. Ranjit Singh with tears in his eyes along with the other Sardars reached where Akali Phula Singh's body was lying in the howdah. Ranjit Singh covered his body with a shawl and returned to his campsite in dismay. The next day Akali Phula Singh was cremated and his ashes deposited in the Lunda river. Akali Phula Singh was succeeded by Jathedar Baba Hanuman Singh Nihang.

== Life as a Nihang leader ==
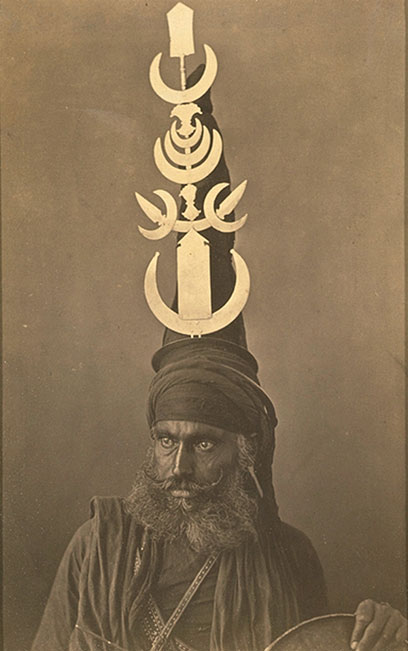
A photograph of an Akali Nihang Sikh taken during the 1860s. The Akali is wearing the characteristically recognisable turban. The Mazhabi Sikhs dominated this order throughout the 18th and 19th centuries.

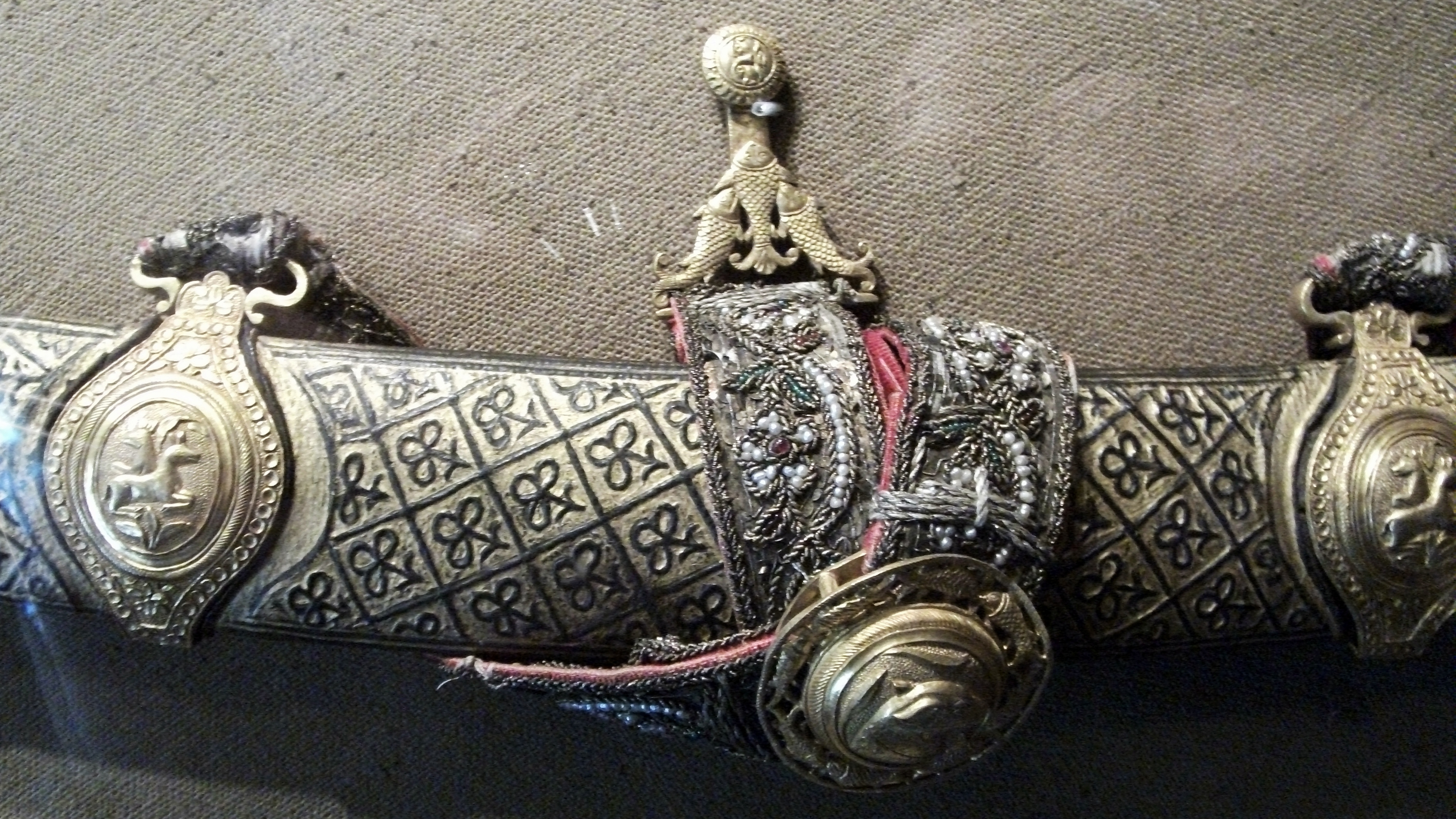
19th-century Shamshir sword. Nihangs carry the traditional longer-length kirpans.

Akali Phula Singh helped solidate many of the ideals of the Guru Khalsa created by Guru Gobind Singh. He was a strict follower of Amrit Vela and the Sri Guru Granth Sahib and paid high importance to do Asa Ki Var daily. As a Nihang sevadar he paid his due to act upon Dharma on the populace. Nihangs do not find it necessary to obey the law of the land nor do they believe in law of property or any subjection of any kind. Akali Phula Singh made it routine to steal much wealth and weapons from rich rulers until he was confronted by Maharajah Ranjit Singh for the act after which whatever Akali Phula Singh required was provided by Maharajah Ranjeet Singh. The Nihangs aim to be at selfless service (seva) of the world though they are especially generous to the poor and weak. Akalis are known to be of great integrity and they are known to not break their hukam.

Nihangs often slept on horses many days at time and it is their rule to be always on the move and to not stay at the same place for too long. They prefer the sword over gun but are also trained to be excellent marksmen. In warfare they are the first to attack and usually do not retreat in battle, rather they just keep charging. They do cries of Akal Akal loudly. Akali Phula Singh enforced all the qualities of the ideal Nihang.

Some prominent English Sikh scholars were against Akali Phola Singh like Max MacAuliffe. Many of the English writers also ignore the Nihangs victories and on often attribute Dogras to substitute when Nihangs fought battles. Akali Phula Singh talked in a unique slang-like Punjabi which was not understood by the British and often misinterpreted.

Akali Phula Singh was sent to assist the Nizam of Hyderabad by Maharaja Ranjit Singh, whom dispatched a force of 300 Akali troops for the cause.

=== Punishment of Ranjit Singh ===
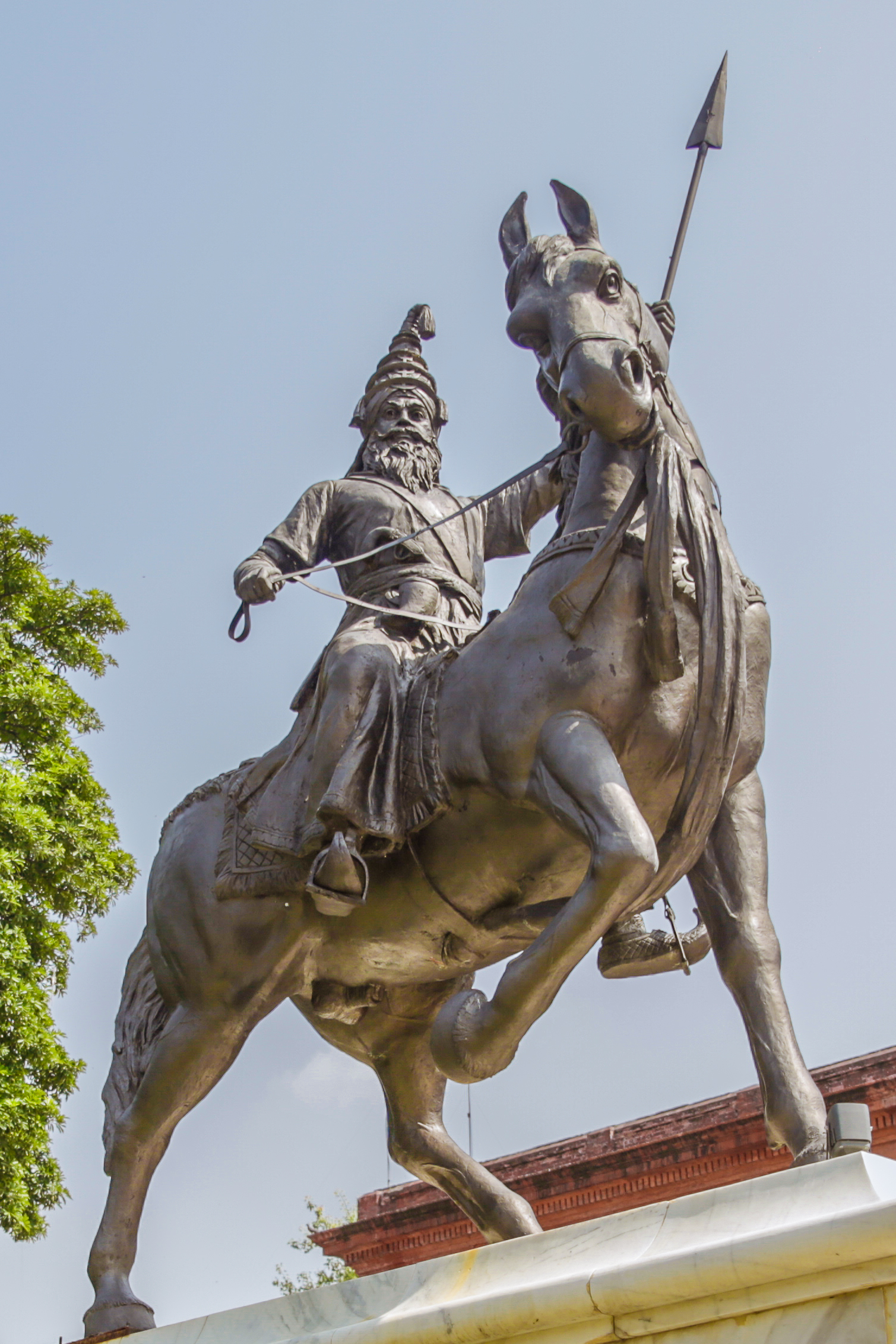
Statue of Akali Phula Singh outside the Partition Museum in Amritsar

Maharaja Ranjit Singh married Moran Sarkar, a Muslim nautch girl. This action, and other non-Sikh activities of the Maharaja, . upset the Sikhs community and Akali Phula Singh. When Ranjit Singh visited Amritsar for his daily listening of the Sri Guru Granth Sahib nobody spoke to him. Ranjit Singh could not bear nobody talking to him so he asked for forgiveness. Akali Phula Singh being the leader of the panth ordered Ranjit Singh to be flogged and he immediately agreed. Upon getting in the position to receive the whipping with a naked back and leaning against the tamarind tree in front of the Akal Bunga (Akal Takht) Akali Phula Singh asked if it was enough that the Maharaja was ready to receive the punishment and should be forgiven without getting the actual whipping. He asked the Sangat who had gathered around if they agreed that he should be forgiven that they should respond with the Sat Sri Akal battle cry in response the entire Sangat cried out Sat Shri Akal in approval.

== Legacy & Culture ==
Akali Phula Singh's samadhi was built at Pir Sabaq, 8 km from Nowshera to Attock, where he was killed. It had a large piece of land attached to it and was a popular place of visit for Sikhs, Hindus, and Pathans especially during Vaisakhi and Dussehra. The Nihangs served langar there up until the creation of India. Akali Phula Singh's land in Amritsar is still run by the Nihangs at the Akali Phula Singh Burj which was built by Maharajah Ranjit Singh himself as a tribute to Akali Phula Singh. The total land attached to Akali Phula Singh Burj was originally over 13 acres but now that number has been greatly reduced. The story of Phula Singh Punjabi has been immortalised in Dhola, an oral epic widely sung and performed right into the late twentieth century in Jat villages of the Braj region of western Uttar Pradesh and eastern Rajasthan.

== See also ==
- Maharaja Ranjit Singh
