= Dhal (shield) =

Indian shield

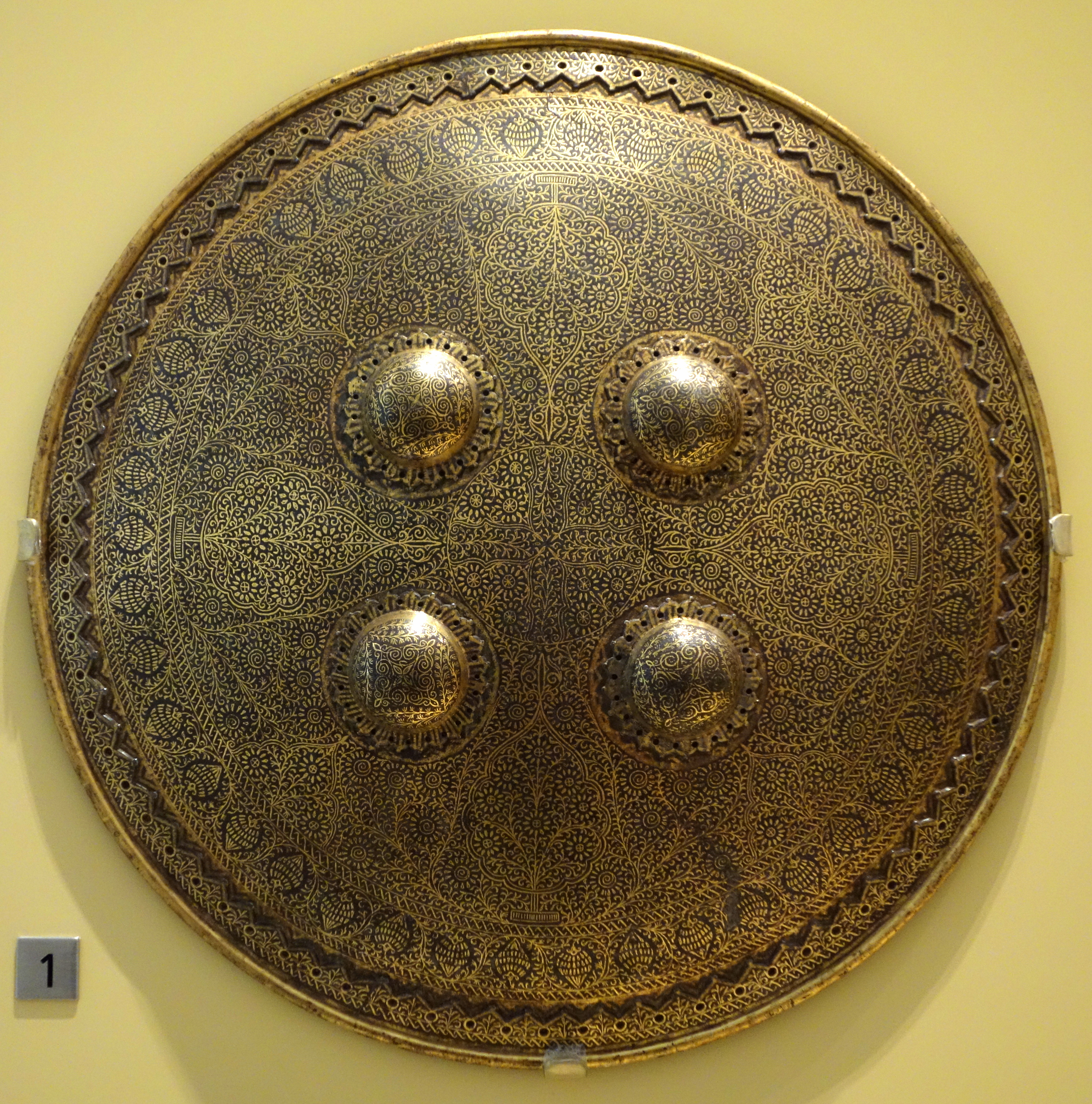
Dhal (shield), from North India, Mughal period, 17th century, made of steel, gold, silk, leather, at the Royal Ontario Museum.

The dhal is a type of buckler or shield found in the Indian subcontinent. They are nearly always geometrically round, and they vary in diameter from about 8 inches (20 cm) to 24 inches (61 cm). Some are nearly flat while others are strongly convex or curved. The edges may be flat or rolled back in the reverse direction to that of the curvature of the shield. Dhal shields were either made from metal or hide.

== Materials ==
Leather shields were made from a great variety of animals found in the Indian subcontinent. The hide shields were made from either water buffalo, sambar deer, Indian elephant, or Indian rhinoceros. The rhinoceros shields were the most-prized variant among leather shields.

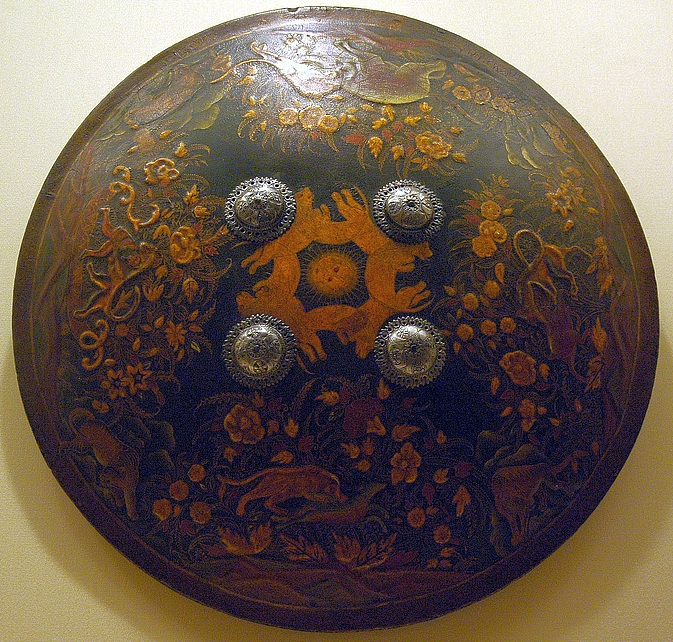
Antique Islamic dhal at the Metropolitan Museum of Art
