= Nihang =

Sikh warrior sect

Akali-Nihang ਅਕਾਲੀ‐ਨਿਹੰਗ
- Nihang version of the Sikh flag

Founder
- Disputed

Regions with significant populations
- Punjab

Religions
- Sikhism

Scriptures
- Guru Granth Sahib • Dasam Granth • Sarbloh Granth

Languages
- Punjabi • Sant Bhasha • Khalsa bole

The Nihang (also spelt as Nihung lit. "Crocodiles") or Akali (lit. "Immortals"), is a martial order of Sikhs originating in the Indian subcontinent. Historically, they were known for their brave fighting skills and ruthless techniques in the battlefield during the Mughal period. Nihang once formed the irregular guerrilla squads of the armed forces of the Sikh Empire. In the 1901 Census, recorded Nihangs were less than one thousand, but more recently, there has been an increase in the Nihang order.

Early Sikh military history was dominated by the Nihang, known for their victories despite being heavily outnumbered. Nihangs also formed an important part of the Sikh Khalsa Army. Despite their obscured origins, the Nihang claim to be the true form of the Khalsa and representatives of Guru Gobind Singh.

The Akalis of the 20th century cannot be traced back to the historical Nihangs, as since 1920, the term Akali has also been used synonymously to refer to members of a Sikh political party called the Shiromani Akali Dal. Nihangs, also known as Dal Khalsa, are believed to have originated either from Fateh Singh and the attire he wore or from the "Akal Sena" (lit. Army of the Immortal) started by Guru Hargobind.

== Etymology ==
The word Nihang may come from the Persian word for a mythical sea creature (Persian: نهنگ). The term owes its origin to Mughal historians, who compared the ferocity of the Akāli with that of crocodiles. The meaning of Akali in Sikhism however, is the immortal army of Akāl (God). According to Harjinder Singh Dilgeer, tracing the term Nihang to the Persian word for a crocodile is a misinterpretation and instead it refers to a "fearless person". Dilgeer states that the term Nihang is also used in gurbani, where it refers to someone carefree.

The word Akāli means timeless or immortal. Literally, it means one who belongs to Akāl (beyond time). In other words, an Akāli is that person who is subject to none but God. Guru Nanak used the term Akal Murat to describe God. The term Akāli, which derived from Akāl, was first used during the time of Guru Gobind Singh. It became popular in the last decades of the eighteenth century. The term came to be associated with “commitment, fearlessness, boldness, struggle, and justice.”

== History ==
=== Origins ===
The origin of the Nihangs is obscure. However, warrior-ascetic traditions in the Indian subcontinent can be traced back to the sixth century BCE. Despite this, warrior-ascetics only achieved political power with the collapse of the Mughal state in the 18th century.

There are various theories on the origin of the Nihangs. According to Pashaura Singh and Louis E. Fenech (1999), reiterating the work of Kahn Singh Nabha, there are three main theories regarding the genesis of the Nihangs. These three theories are summarised below:

- Began with the son of Guru Gobind Singh, Fateh Singh, with his blue clothing (chola) and turban (dumalla), with the Guru prescribing this uniform for his warriors.
- Second hypothesis claims that they originate from the blue-clothing disguise of Guru Gobind Singh when he escaped from Chamkaur in 1704 or 1705. Afterwards, the guru burnt the blue disguise at Dhilwan near Kot Kapura. A follower of the guru, named Man Singh, saved a piece of the blue clothing and attached it to his turban. The Nihangs then originated from the band and disciples of Man Singh.
- Third theory postulates that they can be traced back to the garb of Akali Naina Singh, who was the leader of the Shaheedan Misl.

Dilgeer on the other hand narrates an entirely different theory of origination apart from the above three theories in his Sikh Reference Book. According to Dilgeer, the Nihangs originate from the period of Guru Gobind Singh, when during the Battle of Anandpur Sahib on 2 December 1703, the standard-bearer of the Sikhs, Bhai Man Singh, became injured and the pole of the flag broke, thus Guru Gobind Singh tore a strip of cloth from his blue-coloured under-turban (known as a keski) and tied it on the top part of his over-turban, creating what is known as a farla. (Note: 'Farla' is also spelt as 'farra'.) Mimicking him, other Sikhs of the time, such as Uday Singh, Sahib Singh, Mohkam Singh, and Alam Singh emulated this manner of stylising one's turban with a blue-coloured strip of fabric. Guru Gobind Singh is then said to have mandated all Sikh leaders to follow this practice, so that the Sikh flag can never be lowered. Connecting to the theory regarding Fateh Singh, it is then believed Fateh Singh tried to also decorate his turban with a blue farla in this manner. This change to the Sikh uniform is said to have led to the arising of the Nihangs. Surjit Singh Gandhi hypothesized that the Nihangs originate from the heavy martial emphasis of Guru Gobind Singh.

According to J. S. Grewal, the Nihangs originate from remnants of the Khalsa of the late 18th century who failed or refused to occupy any territory, and were not associated with government or administration. As per Sharanjit Kaur Sandhra, the Nihangs likely emerged as a powerful force during the 18th and early 19th centuries, marked by the decline of the Mughal Empire and the rise of Sikh polities, although there may be origins of the group dating earlier. The Nihang tradition may originate from ascetic Shaivite warrior-traditions, as evidenced by the contents of the Sarbloh Granth and Chandi di Vār. In traditional Sikh martial arts whose custodianship lies with the Nihangs, Shiva is revered as the Adi Akhara Gurdav.

As per the Nihangnama, various historical works discuss the Nihangs and their origin, such as Daya Singh's Rehatnama, Prachin Panth Prakash, Suraj Prakash, Sri Gurpad Prem Prakash, and Naveen Panth Prakash.

=== Pre-colonial period ===
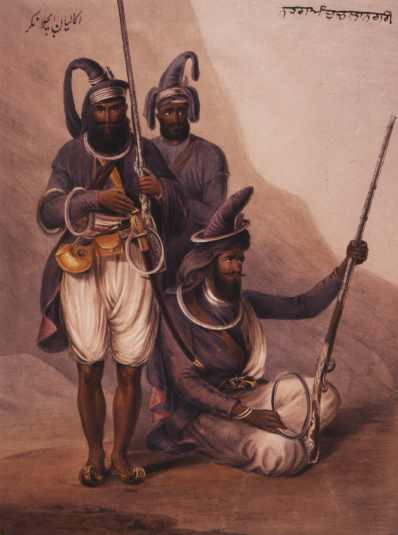
Nihang Abchal Nagar (Nihangs from Hazur Sahib), 1844. Shows turban-wearing Sikh soldiers with chakrams.

It is claimed that the Nihangs arose as early as the period of the Akal Sena of Guru Hargobind, while other theories trace them to the period of Guru Gobind Singh, yet there are few Nihangs recorded in the history of the 18th and 19th centuries aside from Akali Naina Singh and Akali Phula Singh. Nihangs claim Baba Deep Singh as being a Nihang and also trace their legacy back to the bifurcation of the Dal Khalsa into two groups, the Buddha Dal and Taruna Dal, by Nawab Kapur Singh in the 18th century. (Note: The misl-era Budha Dal was originally created for older members (over 40) by splitting the Dal Khalsa into two. Meanwhile, the Taruna Dal was originally created for younger members (under 40) by splitting the Dal Khalsa into two. The Taruna Dal was further divided in five jathas, each with 1300 to 2000 men and a separate drum and banner.) Nihangs claim that their modern organisations sharing the same name can be traced back to these historical organisations of the Misl-era Sikhs. Akali Phula Singh was the overseer of the Akal Takht in Amritsar during his time and participated in the military conquests of the contemporary Sikh Empire. The deras of the Nihangs during Sikh-rule were kept independent from those of other Sikh groups. According to Dilgeer, the Nihangs reached the zenith of their influence during the late 18th and early 19th centuries. During Sikh-rule, the Nihangs maintained many Sikh places of worship. With the oncoming of the mantle of leadership of Akali Phula Singh, the Nihangs also became known by a new term, Akali. Phula Singh and his followers were a source of military-strength for the Sikh Empire but they were also a potential threat to the Sikh throne. As per William G. Osborne, who had a disparaging view of them, the Nihangs frequently disrespected Ranjit Singh while he was parading. Meanwhile, Emily Eden found them picturesque.

During the Sikh Empire and particularly after the death of Phula Singh, the Nihangs became increasingly addicted to cannabis and lost their influence. However, another change marked by the death of Phula Singh is Maharaja Ranjit Singh made an order of Sikhs, namely the sarbarahs and mahants, the custodians of Sikh shrines, with Nihangs assisting in this management structure. (Note: Sarbarah is also spelt as 'sarbrah'.) The Nihangs played a role in the Sikh court but were antagonistic to Europeans and sometimes disobeyed orders, sometimes physically and verbally abusing the Sikh maharaja himself. European visitors to the Sikh kingdom often wrote negatively about the Nihangs. After the death of Maharaja Ranjit Singh, the Nihang order experienced a decline.

=== British rule ===
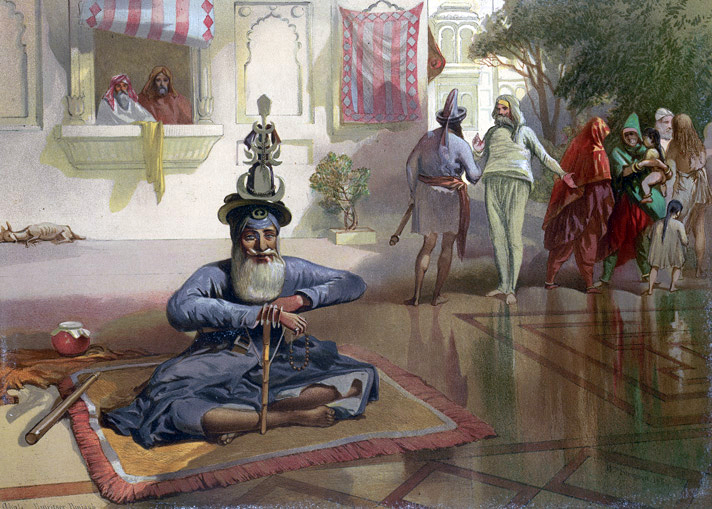
Akalis at the sarovar of Amritsar, by William Simpson, 1867

During British rule, the Nihangs continued to face a decline, with there being fewer Nihangs, as they had lost the former prestige they held during the pre-colonial period. Some of them were addicted to cannabis. In the 1892 census, 1,376 persons recorded themselves as being Nihangs, which this number declining to 431 in the 1901 census. The system of managing Sikh shrines through sarbarahs, mahants, and the Nihangs introduced during the Sikh Empire was continued by the British administration.

During the Singh Sabha Movement, the Sikh reformers may have adopted the unique markers of Nihangs in order to formulate and promote a separate Sikh identity, encapsulated as the Tat Khalsa. Aspects of the Nihang dress was adopted by other Sikhs, as it was seen as being "quintessentially" Sikh, alongside the martial aspects of the Nihangs, which was promoted by the British administrators as being ideal Sikh traits. The Akalis of the 20th century cannot be traced back to the historical Nihangs. Since 1920, the term Akali is also used synonymously to refer to members of a Sikh political party called the Shiromani Akali Dal.

=== Post-independence ===
After the independence of India, Nihang deras started thriving. The Nihangs were renowned for their martial qualities but this popular image was damaged in 1978 and thereafter. During the Punjab insurgency, the Nihangs tended to not support the Khalistan movement, with there only being a few Nihangs who became militants, such as Avtar Singh Brahma and Pipal Singh (as per Ajit Singh Poohla, former leader of the Taruna Dal), who fought for the movement. On the contrary, there are claims of fighting between the Khalistanis and Nihangs. It is alleged that a Nihang dera, the dera of Ajit Singh Phoola, was involved in the murder of the family of a Sikh militant named Joga Singh of the Khalistan Commando Force in Khanpur, Amritsar district. Similarly, Piara Singh Nihang is suspected of murdering over a dozen family members of the Sikh militant Jagir Singh.

The Nihang leader Santa Singh and Ajit Singh Poohla had ties to the Indian National Congress party. Santa Singh was excommunicated from the Sikh religion in 1984. In 2001, Baba Santa Singh, the jathedar of Budha Dal, along with 20 Nihang jathadars (leaders), refused to accept the ban on the consumption of bhang by the SGPC. Baba Santa, Singh was excommunicated for a different issue, and replaced with Balbir Singh, who agreed to shun the consumption of bhang.

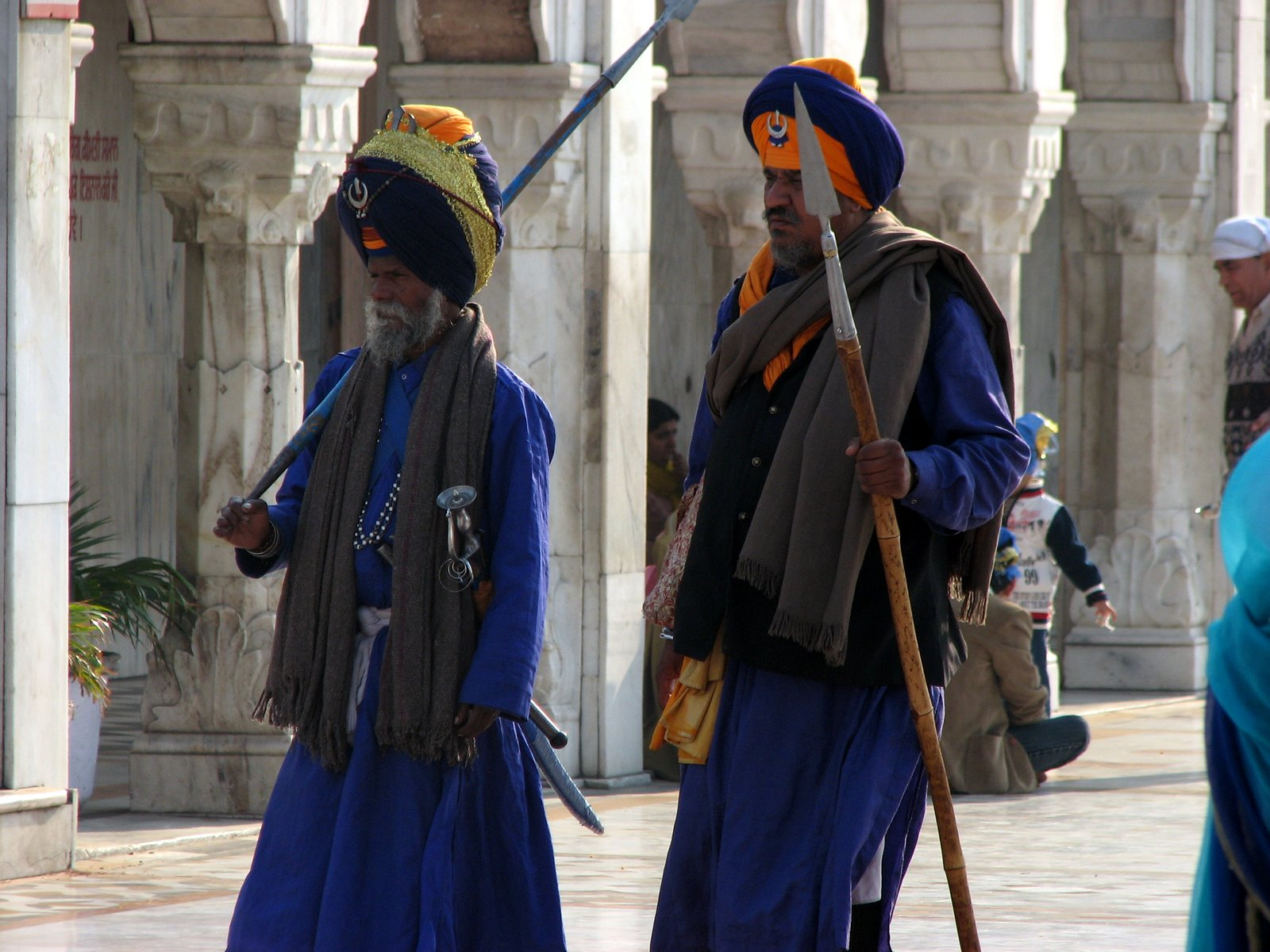
Photograph of a pair of Akali-Nihang Sikhs at Gurdwara Bangla Sahib, Delhi, by Jasleen Kaur, 15 January 2007

Due to their promotion of the Dasam Granth, the Nihangs have succeeded in preventing, or at least slowing, the SGPC from censuring and removing the scripture entirely from the confines of modern Sikh spirituality. Many Nihang deras now operate their own Internet websites.

== Arms and attire ==
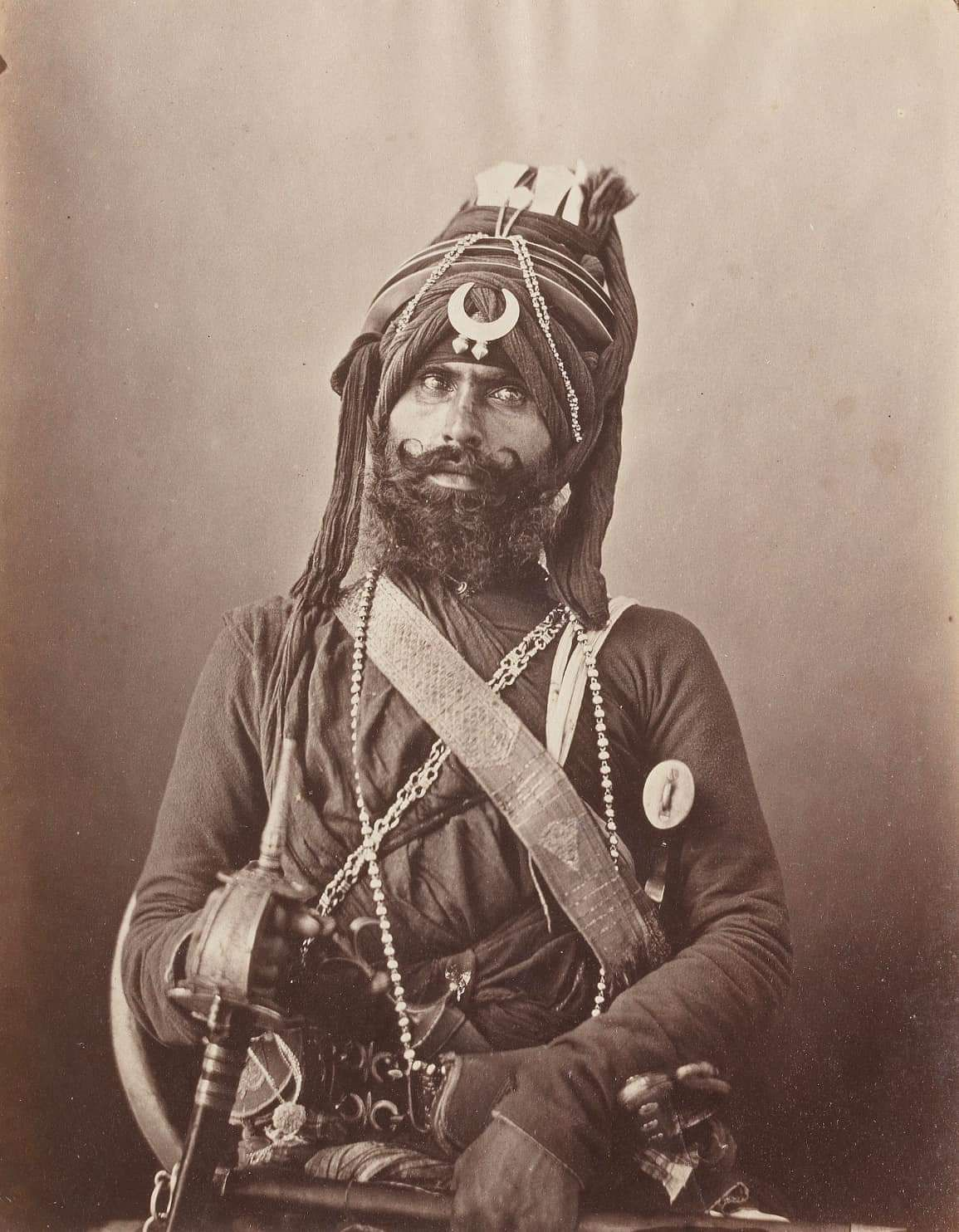
Photograph of a Nihang bodyguard serving in the Nizam of Hyderabad's irregular Sikh army, c. 1865

Traditional Nihang dress is known as Khalsa Swarupa or bana. This comprises full attire of navy blue selected by Guru Gobind Singh after conflicts with Wazir Khan, the Mughal Governor of Sirhind, several edged bracelets of iron round on each of their wrists (jangi kara) and quoits of steel (chakram) tiered in their lofty conical blue turbans, together with the either a dori kirpan (an open blade kirpan that is worn with a rope attached and was meant to be used as a quick access weapon) or a pesh kabaz – a predecessor to the modern kirpan. When fully armed a Nihang will also bear one or two swords (either the curved talwar or the straight khanda, or another type of sword like saif or sarohi on his right hip), a katar (dagger) on his left hip, a buckler made from buffalo-hide (dhal) on his back, a large chakram around his neck, and an iron chain. In times of war, arms worn on the Nihang's person would generally be reserved until the warrior lost the weapon he held, often a bow (kamaan) or spear (barcha). Armour consisted of sanjo or iron chainmail worn under an iron breastplate (char aina). Nihang war-shoes (jangi mozeh) were constructed of iron at the toe, making their pointed toes capable of inflicting cuts and stab wounds. The firearms carried by Nihangs are either a toradar (matchlock) or a musket. In modern times nihangs also carry revolvers, semi-automatic pistols, double-barreled shotguns and bolt-action rifles The Nihangs favour the dark blue colour for their clothing, which they adopted to emulate Guru Gobind Singh's attire when he escaped from Chamkaur through the Machhiwara jungle.

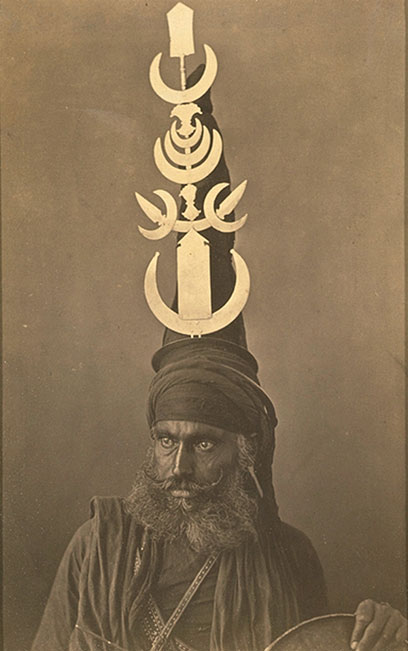
A Nihang wearing dastar bunga

The Nihang were particularly known for their high turbans (dastar bunga) and their extensive use of the chakram or war-quoit. Their turbans were often pointed at the top and outfitted with a chand torra or trident called astbhuja which could be used for stabbing in close-quarters. Other times, the turbans would be armed with a bagh nakh (iron claw) and one or several chakram to slice at an opponent's eyes. These steel-reinforced turbans, it was said, afforded enough protection so that there was no need for any other form of headgear. Today, Nihang still wear miniature versions of five weapons (pancha shastra) in their turbans, namely the chakram, the khanda (sword), the karud (dagger), the kirpan, and the tir (arrow). The Nihangs engage in horsemanship and traditional Sikh martial arts. They have a special affinity to steel (sarbloh) weaponry.

== Organisation and leadership ==
There are four main factions amongst the Nihangs of the modern-era, them namely being: (Note: The Taruna Dal is alternatively spelt/transliterated as 'Tarna'. The Ranghreta Dal is alternatively spelt/transliterated as 'Rangreta'.)

- Budha Dal – Their headquarters are located in Raqba.
- Taruna Dal
- Bidhi Chand Dal – Descend from lineage of Bidhi Chand, a contemporary warrior and companion of the Sikh Gurus. Confined to Sur Singh locality.
- Ranghreta Dal – Prominent amongst Mazhabi Sikhs.

The latter two groups are much less prominent than the former two. Each of the four main faction may have sub-groups representing further divisions. There is no central command within the Nihang Dals, although there are Jathedars. There may be more than one jathedar within a Nihang Dal who operate independently from one another, for example the Taruna Dal. Once a Nihang is elevated to the jathedar office, they generally keep that position for life. Whilst there may be an individual who is assigned as being second-in-command to the jathedar, this is rarely realised. Each Dal broadly consists of both a mobile and stationary group. The mobile group of the Budha Dal, for example, is the Dalpanth. There has been incidents of conflict in the past between different groups of Akalis, even within the same faction.

== Use of intoxicants ==
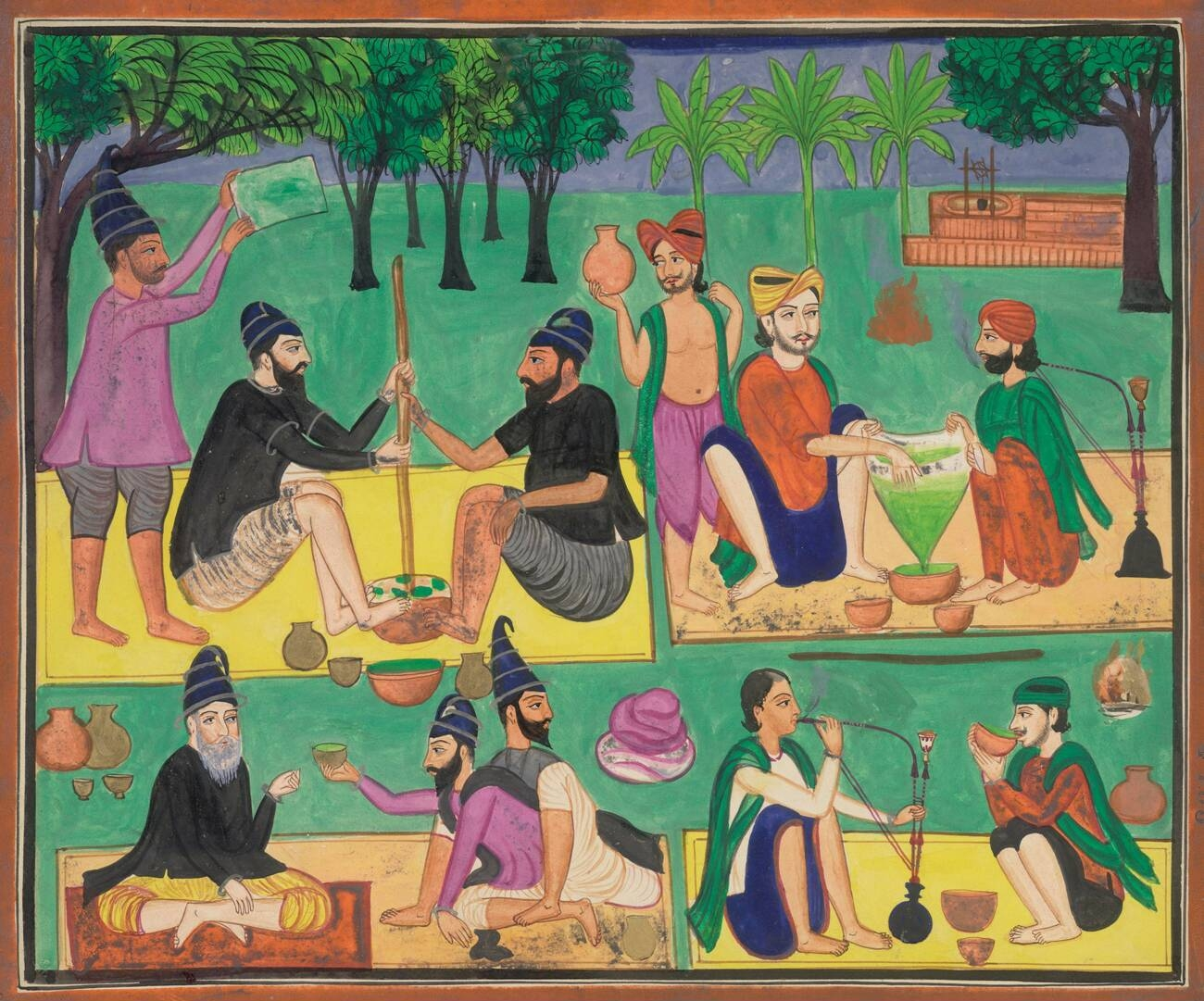
Gouache by an Amritsar artist depicting the preparation and consumption of Indian hemp (bhang), ca.1870

Some Nihang groups consume cannabis or shaheedi degh (ਭੰਗ), also known as sukha, purportedly to help in meditation. Sūkha parshaad (ਸੁੱਖ ਪ੍ਰਰਸਾਦ), "Comfort-gift", is the term Nihang use to refer to it. It is crushed and taken as a liquid, especially during festivals like Hola Mohalla. It is never smoked, as this practice is forbidden in Sikhism. While consuming cannabis, the Nihangs strictly shun and forbid usage of any tobacco or alcohol.

In 2001, Jathedar Santa Singh, the leader of Budha Dal, along with 20 chiefs of Nihang sects, refused to accept the ban on consumption of shaheedi degh by the apex Sikh clergy – in order to preserve traditional Sikh practices. According to a BBC article, "Traditionally they also drank shaheedi degh, an infusion of cannabis, to become closer with God."

== Deras and gurdwaras ==
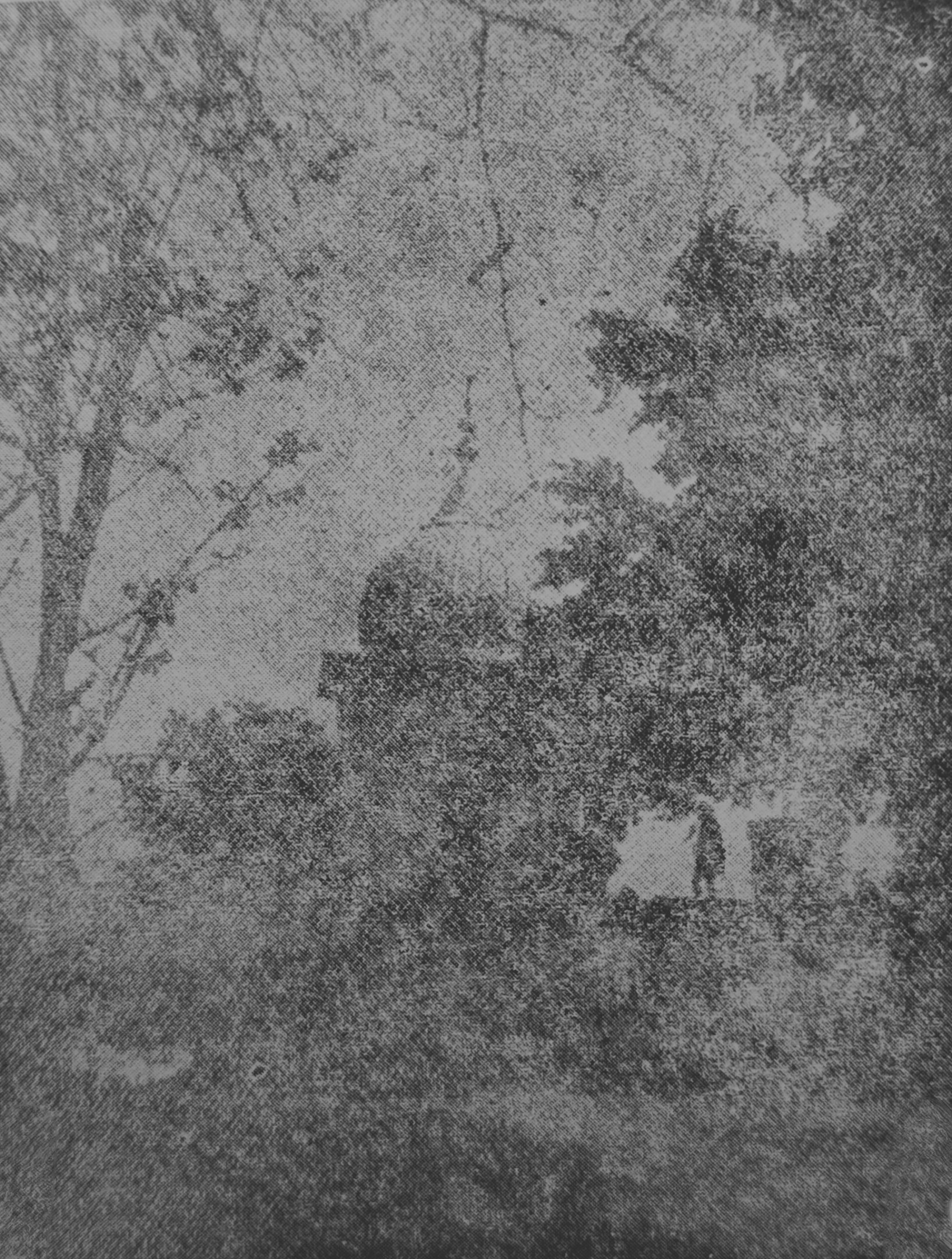
Photograph of Burj Akali Phula Singh, ca.1914. This was the central cantonment of the Akalis/Nihangs under the command of Akali Phula Singh.

The Nihangs operate their own deras (also known as chhaunis, meaning "cantonment"), which are similar to akharas and taksals, except that the Nihang deras focus more on martial training and there is a maintenance of warlike qualities. Each Nihang dera has a special area where sukha is prepared. At Nihang deras, weapons are kept and this is normalised. Nihang deras traditionally kept horses but in the modern-period, automobiles are also kept for transport. Nihangs also operate their own gurdwaras, with groups of Nihang run gurdwaras being associated with a particular Nihang dera. Nihang deras are under the command of the jathedar of their respective associated dal.

== Nishan Sahib ==
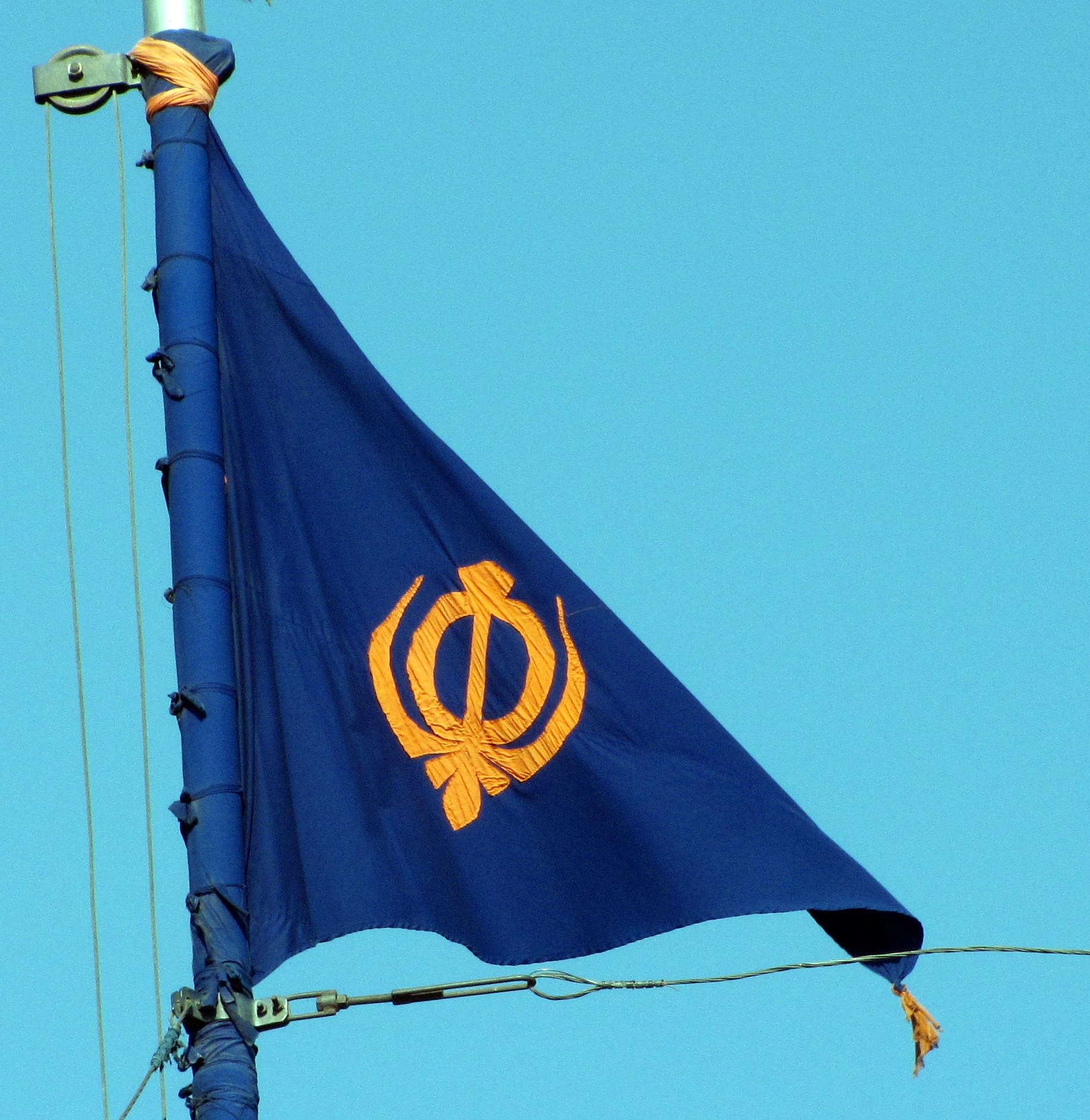
Nishan Sahib in blue, at Baba Phoola Singh di Burj in Amritsar. Those managed by Nihang Dal, have a blue flag instead of traditional orange flag in those managed by SGPC.

The Nihangs carry a unique Nishan Sahib, being navy/electric blue, and (sometimes) bright yellow or basanti with a tegha, dhal and katar. Yellow in Punjabi culture signifies sacrifice, revolt and honour while blue signifies courage, bravery and patriotism. In Punjab, blue is the colour of Khalsa, and yellow the colour of Kshatriyas. Due to various passages from the Dasam Granth, the Nihangs see themselves as Kshatriyas, but believe that the varna is not limited to ones heritage.

== Scriptures ==
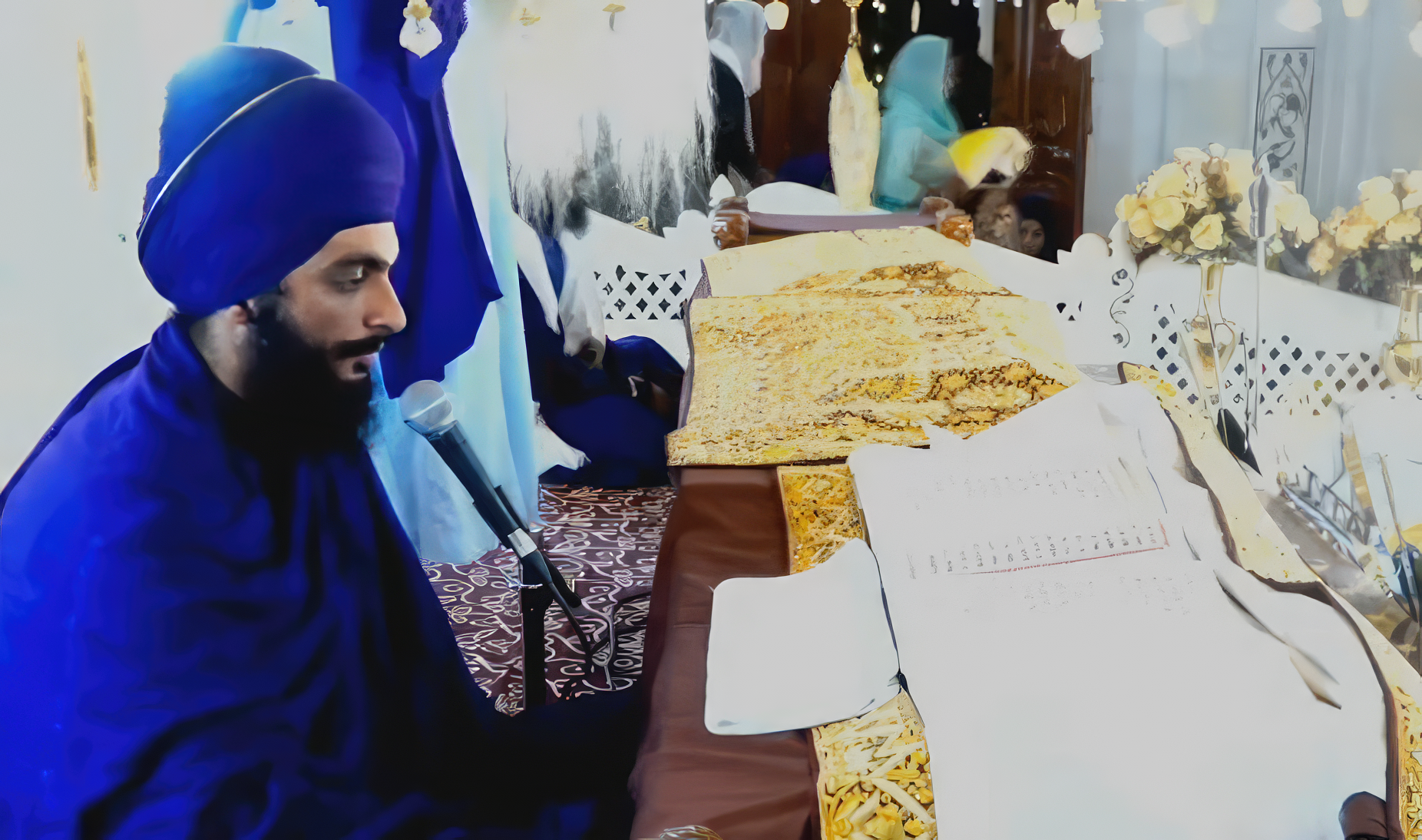
Nihang reading from the Sarbloh Granth, with the Dasam Granth and Adi Granth on his left

The Nihang sect equally reveres the Guru Granth Sahib, Dasam Granth, and Sarbloh Granth. They read excerpts from all three scriptures as part of their daily Nitnem and hymns from them are performed as kirtan and taught as katha to Nihang sangats (congregations). They attribute the later two works to Guru Gobind Singh. They consider the Dasam Granth and the Sarbloh Granth as extensions of the Guru Granth Sahib. As such, they refer to these scriptures as Sri Dasam Guru Granth Sahib, and Sri Sarbloh Guru Granth Sahib. They call the Guru Granth Sahib, Aad Guru Granth Sahib. They also sometimes refer to the scriptures as "Durbar", such as Aad Guru Durbar. The Sarbloh Granth has another name, as Sri Manglacharan Purana. They believe that all three of these scriptures are authentic, written by the Gurus and are one and the same. For this reason, they will often place the Dasam and Aad Granths on the same level and on the same throne (also known as the palki). They also sometimes do this for the Sarbloh Granth as well.

== Festivals ==
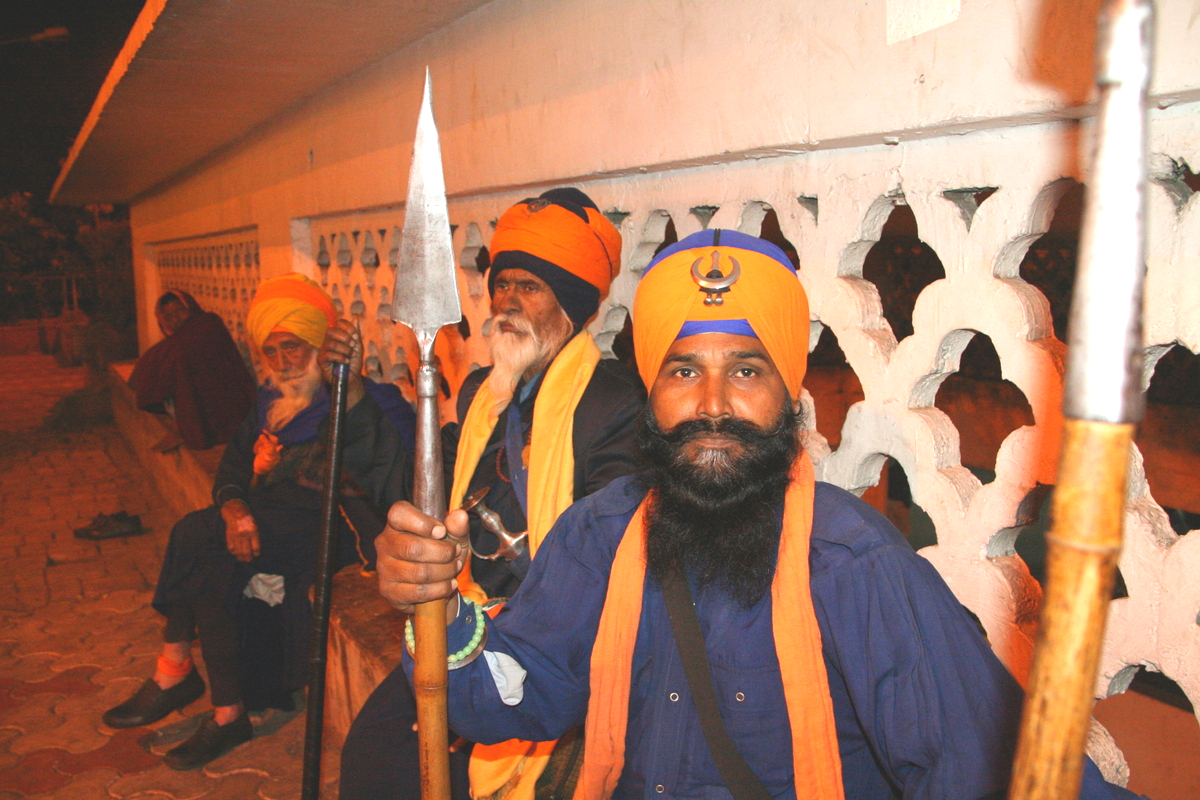
A group of Nihangs from Anandpur Sahib

The Nihangs celebrate Sikh festivals like other Sikhs, with the Dalpanth sub-division (but also other Nihang groups) travelling to Amritsar to celebrate Vaisakhi, Anandpur for Hola Mohalla, Muktsar for Maghi Mela, and Baba Bakala for Rakharh Punnian. The largest Nihang celebration tends to be at Hola Mohalla in Anandpur. Places associated with the Sikh gurus are frequented by Nihang organisations during festivities.

== Diet ==
Nihangs tend to be non-vegetarians. They practice the jhatka method of slaughter, where the animal is killed in a single strike. They make use of iron or steel (sarbloh) utensils.

== Nihang women ==
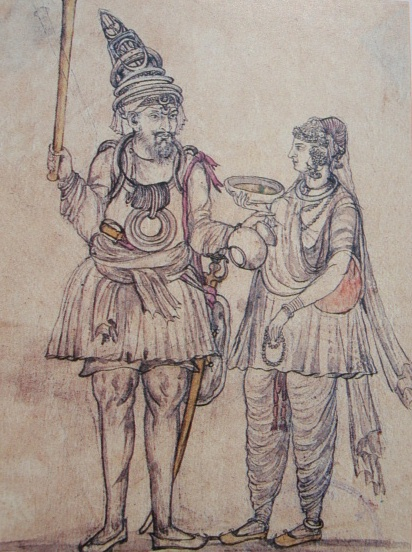
A Nihang Singh and a Nihang Singhani, by Kehar Singh

According to a 19th-century account by Giani Gian Singh, a small number of Nihang women also chose to wear turbans. An 1838 watercolour by Emily Eden depicts a Nihang woman with a turban the same size as her husband's.

== Dialect ==
The Nihangs have developed their own coded language, known as Khalsa bole. The Nihangs use certain vocabulary with distinct semantics. They may have developed this unique linguistic quirk due to their relative isolation. It may have also developed in-order to keep the user in good-spirits and demoralize their enemies.

== Relationship to other Sikhs ==
Whilst Nihangs have gained a reputation of being brave and fearless fighters, being remembered for their sacrifices in the form of martyrdom for the Sikh community (Quom), they are treated rather indifferently and ambivalently by other Sikhs despite the visible presence (due to their unique clothing and behaviour) and symbolism of the Nihangs. Some Sikhs view Nihangs in a negative light, marking them as creating mischief and connecting them to murders and land-grabbing. Ordinary Sikhs may view Nihangs as being bhang (or sukha) consumers but also as troublemakers who avoid paying for train or bus tickets. The tellings of the Sikh past narrated and performed by ragis and dhadis highlight on the sacrifices the Nihangs have made throughout Sikh history.

Thus, Nihangs can be described as being a "neglected" segment of the Sikh community, being subjected to puns, but also being viewed as being particularly orthodox Sikhs. Therefore, the current situation of the Nihangs is one where they have mostly lost their relevance and significance in the Sikh faith in the eyes of other Sikhs. However, their contributions to gatka and promoting the Dasam Granth keep them relevant in the present-day.

Nihang beliefs and practices differ from those ordained in the Sikh Rehat Maryada promulgated by the Shiromani Gurdwara Parbandhak Committee. A key difference is the importance the Nihangs place on the Dasam Granth, meanwhile many other Sikh groups, such as the SGPC, prefer to maintain distance from the work or even deny it outright. Despite these differences, the SGPC and other Sikh bodies generally hold back from criticising Nihangs on their traditions, with both Nihangs and other Sikhs usually not making critical comments about each-other's differing practices and beliefs. However, there have been times when the Nihang practice of holding prakash (installation of a Sikh scripture) of the controversial Dasam Granth beside the Guru Granth Sahib at their places of worship has raised criticism from some SGPC representatives, which is met with refutations from the Nihangs. Nihangs tend to be sensitive to criticisms of the Dasam Granth.

== Popular culture ==
Owing to their unique appearance and practices, the Nihangs were often depicted in artwork. The Nihang is featured as a unique unit for the city-state Lahore in Civilization VI. The city-state and unit were brought into the game during the New Frontier Pass.

In September 2023, a depiction of a Nihang Sikh was painted on the top-right section of an official illustration of the Dallas Cowboys football team as part of the Carpe Omnia ('seize everything') theme for the upcoming sports season.

== See also ==
- Amrit Sanskar – One of the four Sikh Sanskars
- Damdami Taksal – Sikh cultural and educational organization
- Dumalla – Dastaar/turban worn by Sikhs
- Gatka – Martial art from the Punjab region
- Shastar Vidya – Traditional martial art system of the northern Indian subcontinent
- Langar – Sikh community kitchen
- Jhatka – Animal slaughter in Sikhism
- Lohgarh (Bilaspur) – City in Haryana, India
- Misls – Sikh military confederation (1748–1799)
- Nishan Sahib – Flag representing the Sikh people
- List of Nihangs

== Sources ==
- Dasam Granth , The Dasam Granth website
- Book review of the Nihang book The Beloved Forces of the Guru
- "Tribes and Castes of Punjab and N.W. Frontier Province" by H.A. Rose (1892)
- Bhai Sahib Amrit Pal Singh 'Amrit' has presented well-researched articles on Nihangs on his website
- www.Budhadal.com
