= List of Nihangs =

The Nihang (Punjabi: ਨਿਹੰਗ) are an armed Sikh order. They are also referred to as Akali (lit. "the immortals").

== Jathedars ==
- Baba Binod Singh
- Baba Darbara Singh
- Nawab Kapur Singh
- Jassa Singh Ahluwalia
- Akali Naina Singh
- Akali Phula Singh
- Akali Hanuman Singh
- Akali Prahlad Singh
- Akali Giana Singh
- Akali Teja Singh
- Akali Sahib Singh Kaladhari
- Akali Chet Singh
- Akali Santa Singh
- Akali Surjit Singh
- Akali Joginder Singh

== Scholars ==
- Nidar Singh Nihang - Scholar and Grandmaster of Shastar Vidya
- Giani Gian Singh Nihang
- Akali Kaur Singh Nihang -
- Dharam Singh Nihang Singh - Nihang Author, Theologian and preacher
