= 193 Medium Regiment (India) =

Indian Army artillery unit

- Active: 1966–present
- Country: India
- Allegiance: India
- Branch: Indian Army
- Type: Artillery
- Size: Regiment
- Motto(s): SARVATRA, IZZAT-O-IQBAL "Everywhere with Honour and Glory".
- Colors: "Red & Navy Blue"
- Equipment: M777 A2 Ultra Light Howitzer

Insignia
- Abbreviation: 193 Med Regt

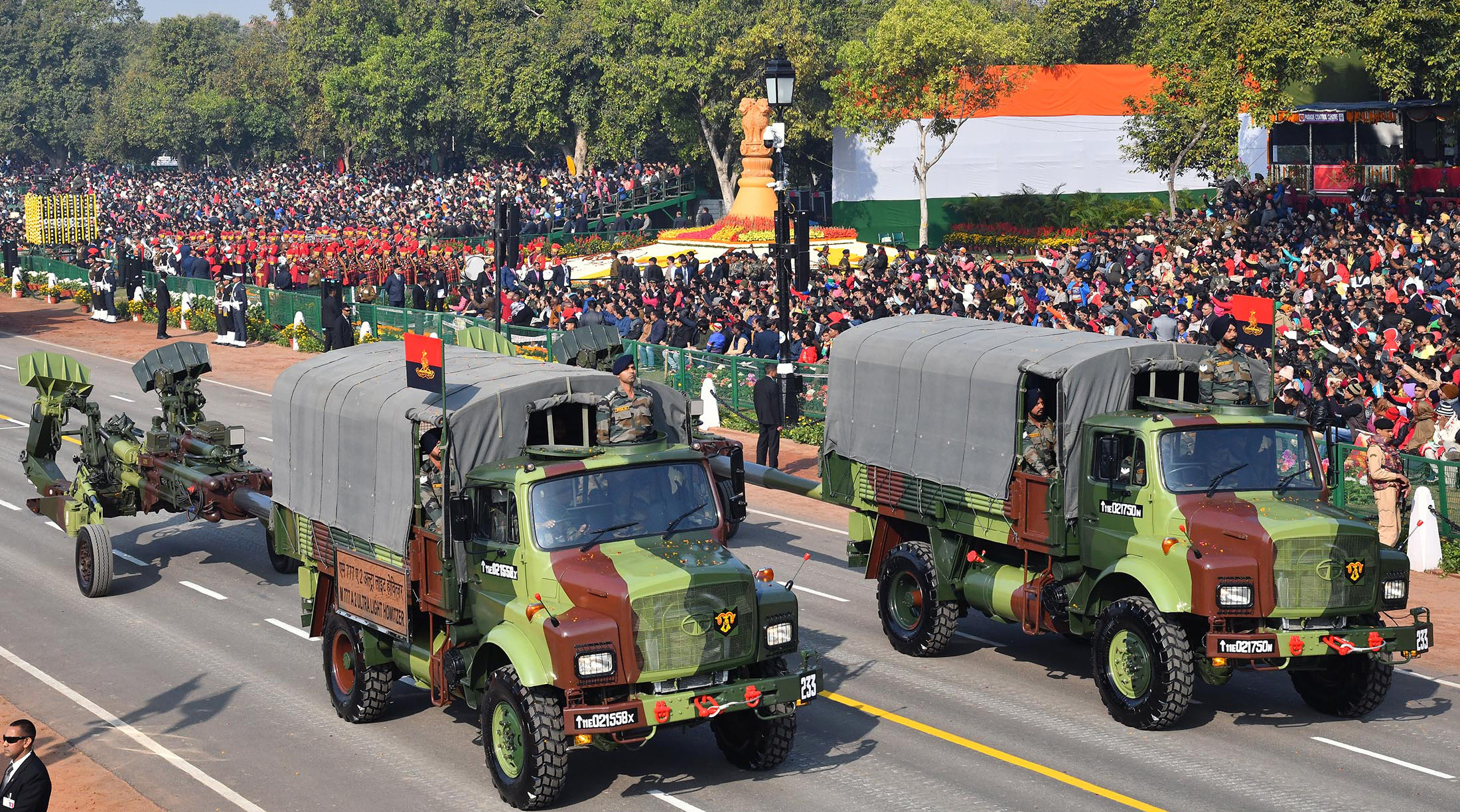
M777 A2 Ultra-Light Howitzers of the 193 Medium Regiment pass through the Rajpath, at the 70th Republic Day Celebrations in New Delhi

193 Medium Regiment is part of the Regiment of Artillery of the Indian Army.

== Formation ==
193 Medium Regiment was raised on February 1, 1966, in Babina. The first commanding officer was Lieutenant Colonel AS Anand. It was raised as a single class composition regiment with Sikh soldiers.

== History ==
The regiment was raised as 193 Mountain Regiment and on re-organisation was converted to 193 Field Regiment in July 1979. It was converted again to a Medium Regiment on 17 January 2007. It was one of the first regiments to be equipped with M777 howitzer.

The battle cry of the regiment is ‘ਬੋਲੇ ਸੋ ਨਿਹਾਲ, ਸਤਿ ਸ੍ਰੀ ਅਕਾਲ’ (Bole So Nihal, Sat Sri Akaal), which translates to Whoever utters (the following words), (it) shall be fulfilled - Truth is the Timeless One.

== Operations ==
Indo-Pakistani War of 1971

The regiment moved to Bakloh, Himachal Pradesh in January 1971, where it inherited the vintage 3.7 in Howitzers. The guns were subsequently changed to the newly developed 75/24 mm Pack Howitzers. The regiment moved near Jammu in October 1971 and was tasked to provide artillery support to 19 Infantry Brigade for the capture of Chicken's Neck—a salient of about a 180 square kilometres area west of Jammu. This was accomplished following artillery support by the unit between 4th and 6 December 1971. The guns had scored direct hits on the Pakistani headquarters at Phuklean Rest House earning the unit a humorous suffix "Ph! Ph! (Phulean Phuckers)". The regiment then moved to the Jammu–Sialkot axis on 12 December 1971 and commenced bombardment of Sialkot city, till cease fire was declared on 16 December 1971.

Counter terrorist operations

The regiment has a brief counter terrorism exposure in Jammu and Kashmir during 1996, when three militants were eliminated in Lolab Valley. It subsequently had a two year tenure between March 2004 and October 2006, during which it won the General Officer Commanding-in-Chief (Northern Command)'s unit appreciation award.

Other operations

The regiment has also participated in Operation Savage (January 1976 – July 1979), Operation Rakshak (1996), Operation Falcon (1999), Operation Parakram (2001–2002), Operation Rakshak (2004–2006) and Operation Meghdoot (2013–2015).

== Achievements ==
- The regiment has won 3 Sena Medals, 3 Chief of the Army Staff’s Commendation Cards, 1 Vice Chief of the Army Staff’s Commendation Card, and 5 General Officer Commanding in Chief’s Commendation Card.
- The regiment won the General Officer Commanding-in-Chief (Northern Command)’s ‘unit appreciation’ award on 24 January 2007 for counter terrorist operation in Jammu and Kashmir. It won the General Officer Commanding-in-Chief (Southern Command)’s ‘unit appreciation’ award in 2018. It won the General Officer Commanding-in-Chief Northern Command’s ‘unit appreciation’ award in 2024.
- The regiment had the honour to participate in the 70th Republic Day Parade, in New Delhi on January 26, 2019, with its M777 A2 Ultra-Light Howitzers.

== Notable personnel ==
- Lieutenant General SK Bahri PVSM – Commanded the regiment during the Indo-Pakistani War of 1971 and went on to become Master-General of the Ordnance.

== See also ==
- List of artillery regiments of Indian Army
