= Dharam Singh Nihang Singh =

Indian Sikh scholar (1936–2025)

Giani, Bhai Dharam Singh Nihang Singh
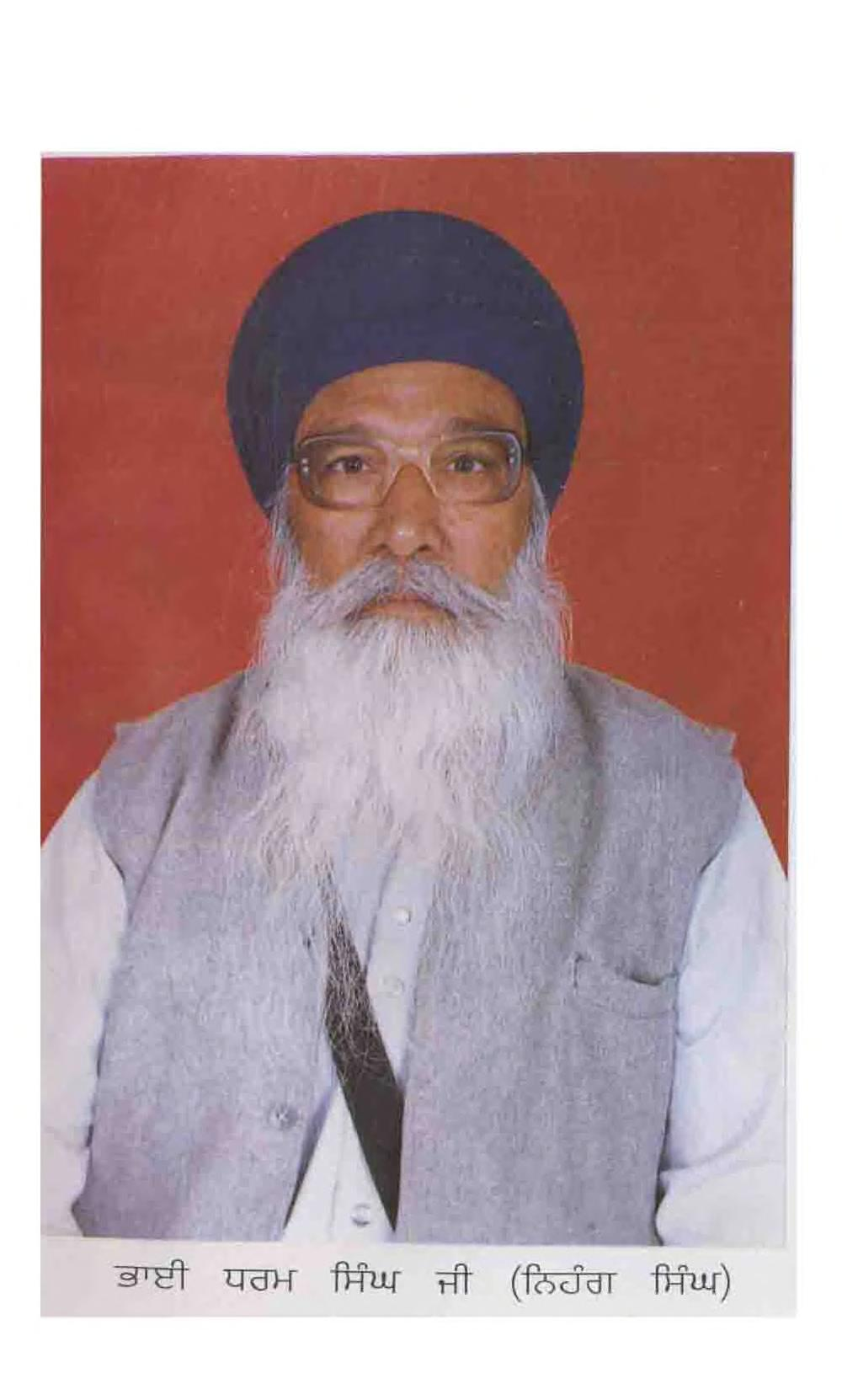
- Born: 15 February 1936; Khanna, Ludhiana, India
- Died: 17 February 2025 (aged 89); Mohali, India
- Citizenship: India
- Occupation: Theologian/Preacher/Spiritual Researcher
- Organization: Sachkhoj Academy
- Known for: Expositions of Adi Granth and Dasam Granth
- Website: sachkhojacademy.org

Dharam Singh (15 February 1936 – 17 February 2025) (Gurmukhi: ਧਰਮ ਸਿੰਘ ਨਿਹੰਗ ਸਿੰਘ, Devnagri:धरम सिंघ निहंग सिंघ) was a Nihang theologian, writer, preacher known for exegesis and expositions of Adi Granth and Dasam Granth. Enrolled as Nihang in Budha Dal, he worked as a secretary and participated in various religious conventions. He contributed the view of Sikh Religion on Human Rights in German Book, Menschenrechte im Weltkontext. In February 2015, he was the very first speaker of the dialogue series entitled Religion Matters established by the German Federal Ministry of Economic Cooperation and Development (BMZ). On letter call from SGPC, he had written various articles in response to Gurbaksh Singh Kala Afghana, who spoke against Amrit and Dasam Granth.

He started Sachkhoj Academy which provides platform for independent researchers of Gurbani to perform unbiased research, and learning to use the Adi Granth dictionary lexical resource for the exegesis. Singh died on 17 February 2025, at the age of 89.

== Early life and education ==
He was born at Manupur-Goslan, Khanna, Punjab to Bhagwan Singh and Harnam Kaur. At Khanna, he had his primary education and matriculated from AS High School in 1954. In 1956, he completed his Intermediate with Hindi as his major.

== Life and works at Buddha Dal ==
He belonged to a Nihang family. His paternal uncles (Taya and Chacha) and first cousin served as Nihang in Budha Dal. His taya was jathedar of Budha Dal, Samrala Circle. Among others, Dharam Singh used to have discussions on Banis in Das Granthi with his coeval nephew.

In 1960, Dharam Singh began to participate in religious gatherings called Jorh Melas, with Budha Dal. In 1962, he enrolled as a Nihang in Budha Dal at Hola Mohalla function in Anandpur Sahib, after Akhand Path of Dasam Granth.

He served as a secretary in the Dal, which was under command of Akali Chet Singh, and used to manage ledgers and other paper work, being among the most formally educated in the Dal during that time. In 1965, he participated in Path Antar Masla and Pothi Mangal conventions along with Buddha Dal representations and offered various suggestions on both topics.

== Gurbani research and Sachkhoj Academy ==
He continued his research of Gurbani, led by the guidance in it such as, ਏਨਾ ਅਖਰਾ ਮਹਿ ਜੋ ਗੁਰਮੁਖਿ ਬੂਝੈ ਤਿਸੁ ਸਿਰਿ ਲੇਖੁ ਨ ਹੋਈ ॥੨॥(Adi Granth, 432) and ਬਿਦਿਆ ਸੋਧੈ ਤਤੁ ਲਹੈ ਰਾਮ ਨਾਮ ਲਿਵ ਲਾਇ॥ (Adi Granth, 938): he concluded that Gurbani is self-contained and that it provides its own explanations by itself. That the exposition of Gurbani can only be conducted best taking the ‘formless being’ as focal point, and not like the way the subject has been treated in the previous Expositions.

From 1970-92, he had discourses with people of various religious affiliations like Yogis, Bairagis, Kabirpanthis, Muslims, Pundits etc., during his stay in Garhmukteshwar, (Uttar Pradesh). In 1992, he returned to Khanna and started Gurmat classes on request of Bhai Iqbal Singh of Missionary College after their mutual discussions. In 1994, Sachkhoj Academy came into being.

== Literary works ==
=== Books ===
- Naad Ved Vichar - Punjabi Language, Teeka of Japji Sahib
- Sahij Samadhi Banaam Sunn Samadhi - Punjabi Language, Teeka of Sidh Goshti
- Menschenrechte im Weltkontext - German Language, on Human Rights in Sikh Religion
- Jaap Sahib - Punjabi Language, c.2015 Dalbara Singh Pannu, on refined Teeka/ translation of Jaap Sahib

=== Articles ===
On request of SGPC, he had written various research articles which were published in Gurmat Prakash and also various magazines in Sikh world. Following are list of articles, taken from 50 Year History of Gurmat Prakash:

1. Gian da mudda
2. Gurbani dee sedh vich turna pavega
3. Gurbani di sahee viakhia
4. Gurbani nu samhjan layi gurmukhi drishti di lorh
5. gursikhi kirdaar vich curroption layi koi jaghaan nahin
6. Je ko gurmukh hoye
7. Naam japan di gurmat vidhi ki hai
8. Piri di asal talwaar - gur gyaan khadag
9. Nihang singh sikhi de jhanda birdaar hann
10. Tarak vitarak(hujjat) ate vivek budhi
11. "sikh pachaan" dee chintaa sahi gurmati prchaar hi door karega
12. Panth khalsa di jathebandak majbooti layi Gurbani di sedh ch turna pavega
13. Bhaarti dalitaan nu gurmati naal kinve jodeya jaave
14. Gantantar banaam guntantar
15. Ki gur nanak dev ji naal 'gur' di jaghaan 'guru' lag sakda hai?
16. jappna te simran karna naam japan di gurmati vidhi ki hai?
17. Ki gurgaddi Gurbani guru gyaan nu nahi mili?
18. Astik Nastik gurmati dirshtikon
19. Guru dumm da sahi hall, gurubani di sahi viakhia
