= Jaikara =

Religious slogans in Indic religions

Jaikaras are religious slogans used in Indic religions. They are usually shouted in a group-setting as a devotional practice. Jaikaras can be found in both Hinduism and Sikhism.

== Hinduism ==
In Hinduism, there are Shaktist jaikaras to pay deference to specific Indic goddesses, known as Maa Aap Bulandi. They are often shouted together as a group amongst devotees and sometimes in specific scenarios, such being in the midst of a religious trek. They are believed to encourage the congregation and strengthen their resolve, it is also way of expressing devotion to a particular deity. However, jaikaras can also be chanted when alone or when two groups of pilgrims cross paths with one another.

Common Hindu jaikaras are as follows:

- Jai mata di ("victory of the Mother Goddess")
- Jaikara sheranwali da ("salutations to the Divine Mother whose mount is a lion")
- Sanchey Darbar Ki Jai ("obeisance to the sacred court")

== Sikhism ==
The word jaikara occurs within Sikh scriptures. Amongst Sikh, the jaikaras function as a battle-cry, described as being a "shout of victory" or "war-cry" slogan, also referred to as a fateh. Jaikaras are said to conclude Sikh religious services. They are used as phrasal slogans of respect, appraise, or obeisance and its purpose is a mixture of spirituality, euphoria, and preparation. A common Sikh jaikara is: Jo bole So Nihal, Sat Sri Akal ("Blessed is the person who says God is Truth") and was used in-battle. They are often uttered as a huzza shouted together in a group. Jaikara slogans are called-out at the end of a Sikh religious service, being a critical part of them to mark an end of the program. It additionally functions as an pledge to follow the path of truth. A common practice during Sikh deliberations is to close the debate and go with the last suggestion after a particularly lively jaikara is shouted. Jaikaras can also function as greetings.

According to Harjinder Singh Dilgeer, the original form of the bole so nihal jaikara may have been: Jo jaikara bulaavai guru de man nun bhaavai; gaij ke bolnaa ji Akaal! Akaal! Akaal! He further claims this original phrase was shorterned simply to (Jo) bole so nihal, sat sri akal and that it should not be used as a greeting. Another Sikh jaikara, used to greet another Sikh, is Waheguru ji ka (da) Khalsa Waheguru ji ki (di) Fateh. Banda Singh Bahadur is charged with attempting to change the standard Sikh jaikara to Fateh Darshan.

Some other popular Sikh jakaras are as follows:

- Bolnaji (Respectfully Utter) – Waheguru (Wondrous Enlightener)
- Deg Teg Fateh (Victory to Charity and Arms) – Birdh ki Paij Panth ki jit (Rout of the Enemy Victory of the Sikh Path)
- Bole So Nihal...Sat Sri Akaal ("Shout Aloud in Ecstasy... True is the Great Timeless One")
- Nanak naam charhdi kalaa (May Thy name be exalted O Nanak) – Tere bhaanae sarbatt daa bhalaa (and all people prosper by Thy grace)
- Waheguru ji ka Khalsa (the Community of the Pure belongs to the Wondrous Enlightener) – Waheguru ji ki Fateh (Victory belongs to the Wondrous Enlightener)
- Raj Karega Khalsa – (The Khalsa will rule) Aaakki Rahe Na Koye (And no opponent will remain)
- Gaj ke jaikara gajaave fateh paave nihaal ho jaavae, Sat Sri Akaal gurbaar akaal hee akaal|| (excerpt from ardas of Buddha Dal prayerbook (gutka) praising the blessing of uttering jaikara proclaiming supreme truth)
- Fateh Singh Ke Jathe Singh
- Fateh Darshan (meaning 'bear witness to the victory'), historical jaikara used by the Bandai sect (followers of Banda Singh Bahadur)

== Ad-Dharmis ==
The Ad-Dharmi movement of colonial Punjab adopted the salutation Jai Guru Dev ("victory to the great God").

== Ravidassia ==
The Ravidassias, a splinter-movement from Sikhism, have their own jaikara which differs from the mainstream Sikh one, which is as follows: Jo bole so nirbheh, Shri Guru Raviassi Ki Jai ("whoever utters the following phrase shall be fearless, victory to Guru Ravidas"). The separatist faction of Ravidassias have coined their own jaikaras to mark their desired separateness from mainstream Sikhism. In Ravidassia temples, some orthodox Sikhs and Sikh-affiliated Ravidassias have criticized their adoption of a unique jaikara that is different from the mainstream Sikh one, leading to tensions and incidents.
