= Sachkhoj Academy =

Non-profitable Sikh academic Institution located in Khanna, Ludhiana, Punjab, India

Sach Khoj Academy
- Abbreviation: SKA
- Formation: 1996
- Founder: Dharam Singh Nihang Singh
- Type: Religious Organization
- Purpose: Research of Gurbani
- Headquarters: Punjab, India
- Official language: Gurmukhi
- Website: www.sachkhojacademy.org

Sachkhoj Academy(ਸਚੁ ਖੋਜ ਅਕੈਡਮੀ) is a non profitable Sikh academical institution started by Dharam Singh(b. 1936), a Nihang Singh theologian, preacher and writer, known for his exegesis of Adi Granth and Dasam Granth. He worked as a secretary in Budha Dal, under Baba Chet Singh Nihang. The academy was started in 1996 at Khanna, where classes are delivered on the exegesis of various compositions of Adi Granth, Dasam Granth and various topics of Sikhism and other religions. Academy has uploaded enormous amount of audio and video lectures on the internet with expositions of various Compositions of Aad and Dasam granth. It provides platform for independent researchers of Gurbani to perform unbiased research, and learning to use the Adi Granth dictionary lexical resource for the exegesis.

The academy has also produced various articles on different concepts of Gurmat, that have been published by Shiromani Gurdwara Parbandhak Committee and other publications like Missionary Sedhan, Sikh Virsa etc. Dharam Singh's work has been translated to German Language in form of an article titled, Human Rights in Sikh Religion, which is published in book Human Rights in World Context. Academy has also published two books on the exegesis of Japji Sahib and Sidh Gosti, the compositions of Guru Nanak.

== See also ==
- Jathedar Baba Chet Singh Nihang Singh
- Budha Dal
