= SKA =

SKA, Ska or ska may refer to:

- Acharnes Railway Center, station in Athens, Greece
- Armed Forces Office (Germany) (Streitkräfteamt)
- Shotokan Karate of America
- Ska, a style of music
- Ska (leafhopper), a leafhopper genus in the tribe Erythroneurini
- The Ska, a fictional ethnic group from the Lyonesse Trilogy by Jack Vance
- SKA Brewing, Durango, Colorado, US
- Ska-P, a Spanish ska punk band
- Square Kilometre Array, a radiotelescope project
- Sachkhoj Academy, a Sikh academy
- Sparse Kogge–Stone adder in computing
- Ska Keller (born 1981), German politician
- The IATA airport code for Fairchild Air Force Base
- National Trade Union Confederation of Finland (Finnish: Suomen Kansallinen Ammattikuntajärjestö)

== Army sports clubs ==
- Armed Forces (sports society), SKA (Cyrillic: СКА, for "Sports Club of the Army"), in USSR countries

Kyrgyzstan

- Shoro-SKA Bishkek, now FC Alga Bishkek, a Kyrgyz football club

Russia

- FC SKA-Khabarovsk, a Russian football club
- FC SKA Rostov-on-Don, a Russian football club
- HC SKA Khabarovsk, a Russian ice hockey club
- SKA-Neftyanik, a Russian bandy club
- SKA Saint Petersburg, a Russian ice hockey club
- SKA-Sverdlovsk, a Russian bandy club

Tajikistan

- SKA-Hatlon Farhor, a Tajik football club

Ukraine

- SKA Lviv
- SKA Odesa

=== See also ===
- CSKA (disambiguation), USSR Central Sports Clubs of the Army
