= Gian Singh Rab =

Sikh scholar and martial artist

Baba Gian Singh 'Rab'
- Photograph of Gian Singh 'Rab' in 1967
- Known for: Sikh martial artist specializing in Shastar Vidya

Gian Singh 'Rab', also known as Gian Singh 'Sutantar', was a Sikh scholar and martial artist, belonging to the Nihang order, famous for his work on Shastar Vidya. Two disciples of his include Pritam Singh Nihang and Gian Singh.

== Biography ==
=== Scholarly work ===
He spent forty years on textually analyzing the Guru Granth Sahib from very rare manuscripts and over a hundred codices (Birs), eventually publishing his basic findings. His work with other research scholars, such as Kundan Singh and Randhir Singh, was published under the title of Sri Guru Granth Sahib ji dian Santha-Sainchian are Puratan Hathlikhit Pavan Biran de Praspar Path-Bhedan di Suchi (title meaning "The List of Textual Variations Present in the Early Sacred Manuscripts and Printed Versions of the Guru Granth Sahib"), in 1977.

=== Martial arts ===
He was also an ustad (teacher) of the traditional Sikh martial art system of Shastar Vidya, which he taught to many students, helping ensure the survival of the martial art. After Gian Singh 'Rab' died, a small pamphlet he had authored was posthumously published. Santa Singh of the Budha Dal wrote a memoir work about him.

== Students ==
Some of the shastar vidya students, many of whom became accomplished Shastar Vidya instructors themselves, of Gian Singh 'Rab' include:

- Gian Singh (same name as his teacher) of Bhindran, he had trained seventeen Sikhs into becoming Shastar Vidya ustads himself
- Pritam Singh of Patiala
- Gurbax Singh of Langeri, Hoshiarpur district
- Pritam Singh
- Daya Singh 'Bhagatevale'
- Nihal Singh of Harianvelan
- Mohinder Singh, who was the teacher of the famous Nidar Singh
