= Shastar Vidya =

Traditional martial art system of the northern Indian subcontinent

- ਸ਼ਸਤਰ-ਵਿੱਦਿਆ
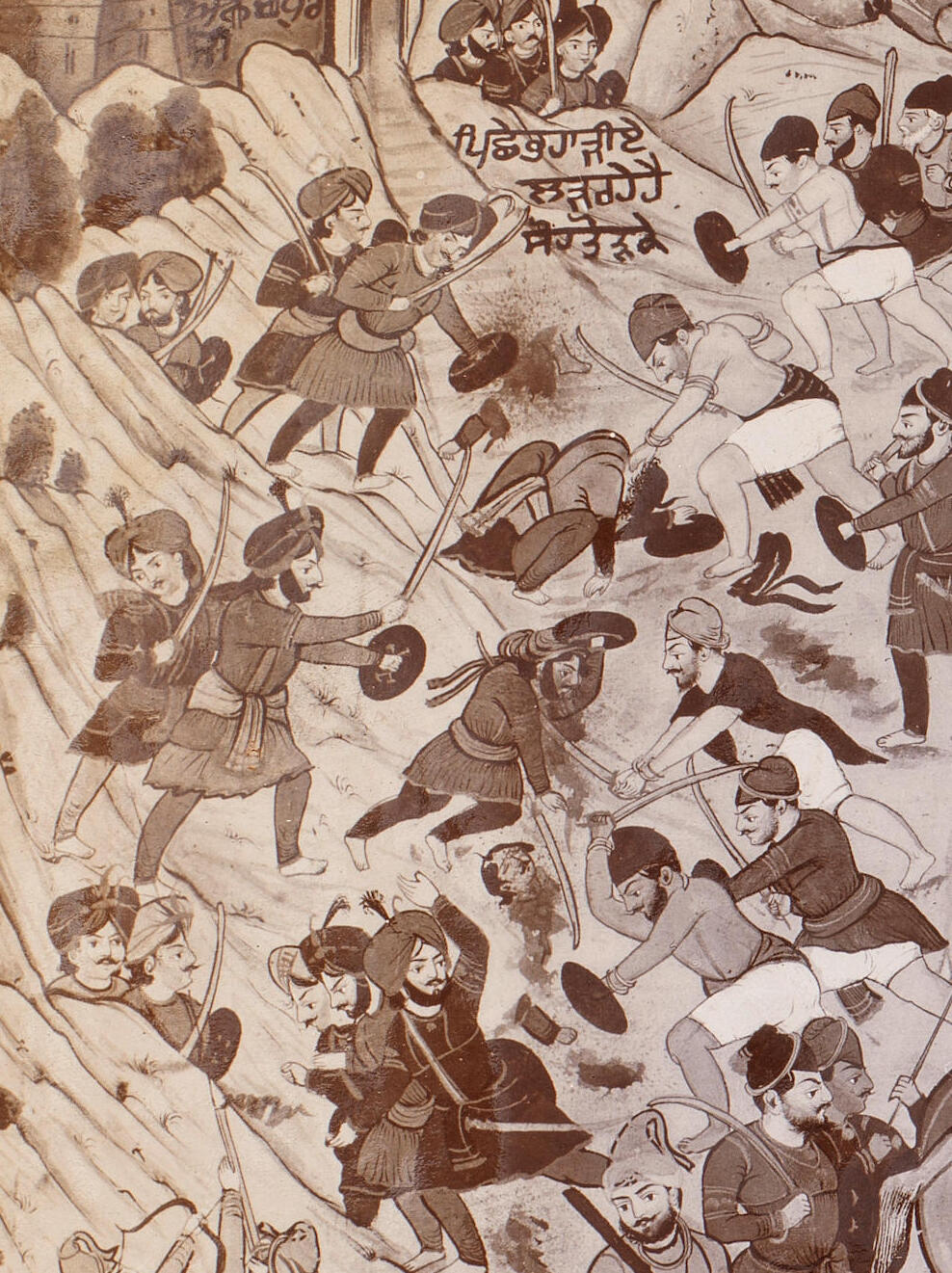
- Focus: Swordsmanship
- Country of origin: India
- Famous practitioners: Nidar Singh Nihang (real name Surjit Singh)

Shastar Vidya (Punjabi: ਸ਼ਸਤਰ-ਵਿੱਦਿਆ, romanized: shastarvidiā, meaning "science of weapons" or "art of weapons"), also known as Sanatan Shastar Vidiya or Jhatka-Gatka, was an ancient martial art of the Indian subcontinent that incorporates various kinds of weapons and techniques, and was revived by Sikhs in Punjab in the 17th century. (Note: Also spelled Shastar Vidiya) Shastar Vidya has also been described as an ancient North Indian martial art involving weapons such as bows, swords, and maces. While in the ancient period it was associated with the Kshatriyas, the Hindu warrior class, the Sikhs became important custodians of the martial art during the medieval Mughal period.

During the British period in Punjab, after the 1850s, Shastar Vidya was gradually replaced by the Sikh Gatka martial art, that had its origin in shastar vidya. The British promoted the ceremonial Gatka martial art. Due to the changing nature of warfare brought about by technological advances, the Shastar Vidya martial art continued to decline in the 19th and 20th centuries. There have been some recent attempts to revive the martial art.

== Background ==
According to some scholars, Shastra Vidya is the name of the ancient North Indian martial art of the Kshatriyas – Hindus of the Vedic warrior class, which includes a broad range of armed and unarmed combat techniques, such as ground-fighting moves, sword strikes, mace blows, discus throws, and archery techniques. Martial-arts has a long association with Sikhism, with Guru Angad believed to have sponsored wrestling and learnt it from Guru Nanak. Guru Ram Das founded the Mal Akhara in Amritsar and awarded a turban-of-victory to Guru Arjan after he won a wrestling match against the wrestler Maskeen. The next guru Guru Hargobind martialized the Sikhs further, such as the adoption of the principle of miri-piri.

The UNESCO-affiliated ICM martial arts database describes Shastar Vidya as: "an ancient North Indian martial art from the Kshatriyas, Hindus of the Vedic warrior class" and notes that the literal meaning is "science of weapons" and identifies it as a warrior art involving weapons such as bows, swords, maces, axes, and tridents. Sanatan Shastra Vidya also included connections among Hindu gods, martial arts, and pre-battle goddess worship, as well as the Dharmic rules of warfare.

Whilst the term Gatka is commonly used to refer to the modern Sikh martial art system, the historical term was Shastar Vidya, which encompassed a broader range of practices. Gatka is part of one branch (an aṅg) of the wider Shastar Vidya martial art system. According to Nidar Singh the Shastar Vidya existed in the Indian subcontinent before Sikhism and was preserved by people from many different cultures and religions.

== Utility ==
According to the former Jathedar of the Damdami Taksal, Gurbachan Singh Bhindranwale, there are two different kinds of the vidya (science/art), the first is performative (meant for exhibition) and the second is authentic and bona fide (which is lethal). According to him, the second type is meant for the warrior who is ready to kill his enemy or become a martyr himself. The form of gatka which is authentic and lethal is termed as jhaṭkā-gatkā but very few masters of the genuine martial art exist in the present-day as the martial art has become dominated by the performative expression of it.

== Branches ==
Shastar Vidya is made up of seven aṅg (components, or branches):

- Bāhu yudh – unarmed combat
- Loh mustī – iron fist fighting
- Mal yudh – wrestling
- Gadā yudh – stick/club fighting, including Gatka
- Shastar yudh – weapon fighting
- Astra yudh – missile fighting

== Training ==
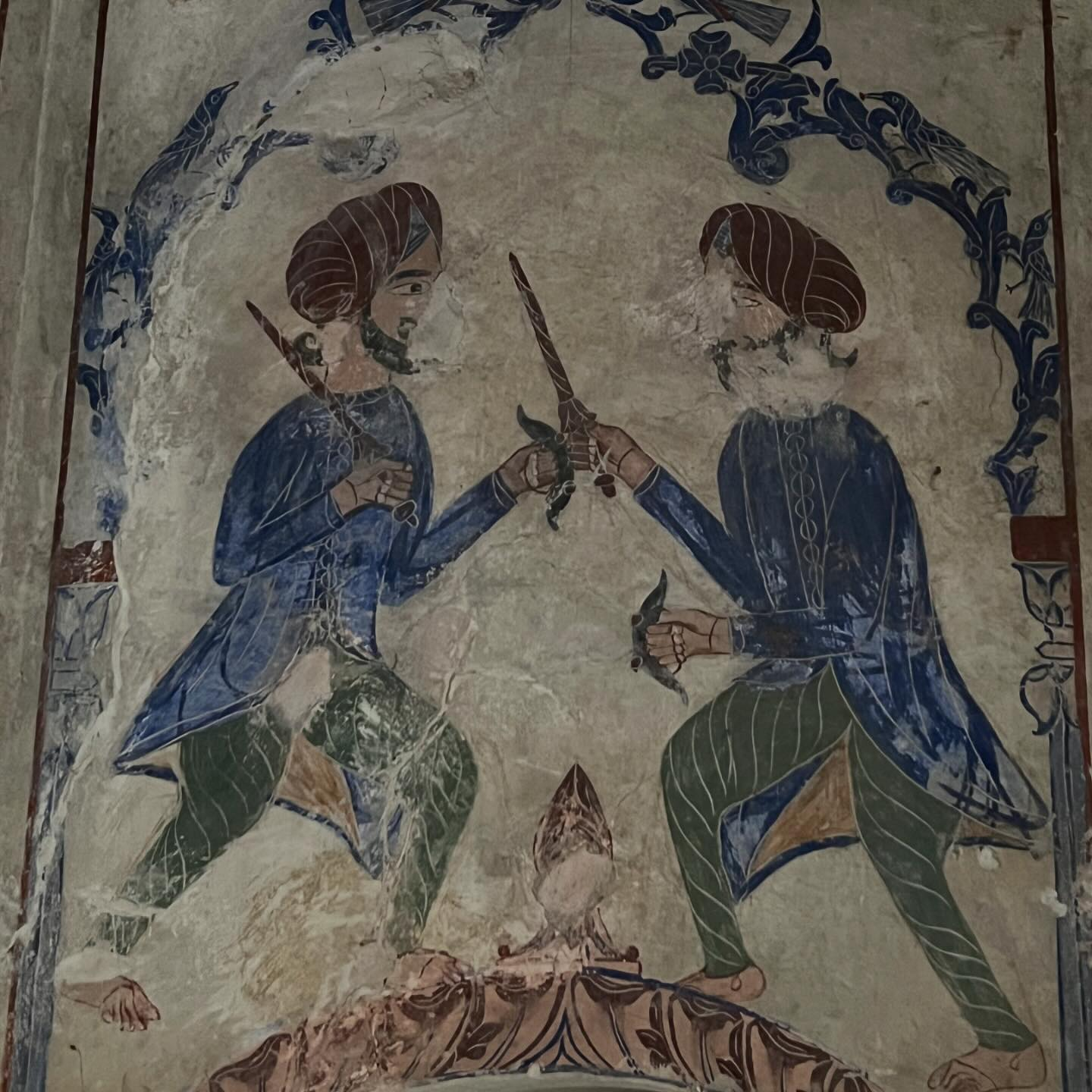
Mural depicting two Sikhs sparring, from Shahi Samadhan, Sangrur, ca.1870's

The bare necessities required for mastery of Shastar Vidya is a healthy diet and physical fitness, which is reached through exercises such as sūraj namaskār (sun salutations), bhujaṅg-dand (Indian press-ups), and ūtak-baiṭakh (Indian squats). After the 17th century, the master and teacher of Shastar Vidya was called an ustad, while the students and disciples were called shagirad.

Weapons are usually taught through sparring with a sword and shield but usually non-lethal forms of weapons are used for beginners, such as wooden sticks. Once a student has reached an advanced level, sparring with actual lethal weapons can occur but it requires stringent discipline and focus. People sparring are referred to as khidārīs.

In order to produce a capable warrior that is ever reminded of death even while living, the martial art stresses upon both spiritual (meditation and prayer) and temporal strengths (awareness, healthy diet, exercise, and fighting techniques) of humanity. Practitioners are to follow a strict Rehat (code of conduct).

The martial art combines and stresses upon the Sikh religious concepts of tyar bar tyar (a state of being "ready upon ready"), sevā (selfless voluntary service), and Degh Tegh Fateh (victory of charity and arms).

== Fundamentals ==
=== Footwork ===
Footwork forms are referred to as Paiṅtarā or asanas. They are used to coordinate the entire body in unison with whatever weapons are being wielded.

Some of the different footwork styles are as follows (each may incorporate different kinds of weapons):

- mūl paiṅtarā – the most basic form that the others are based upon. It is a simple four-step pattern and an exercise of both balance and coordination of the body that is regularly practiced.
- tiger paiṅtarā
- monkey paiṅtarā
- bull paiṅtarā
- snake paiṅtarā
- eagle paiṅtarā

=== Movements ===
Working upon the footwork, there are various movements that "dictates the strategy of engagement". The different kinds of movements or actions are termed pāitā. Membranophone instruments like the nagara or dhol drums are used to aid the rhythms of the various movements so the practitioners can internalize them to muscle-memory.

Some pāitā forms are as follows:

- īta-ūta – forward-and-backward, side-to-side movements

=== Maneuvers ===
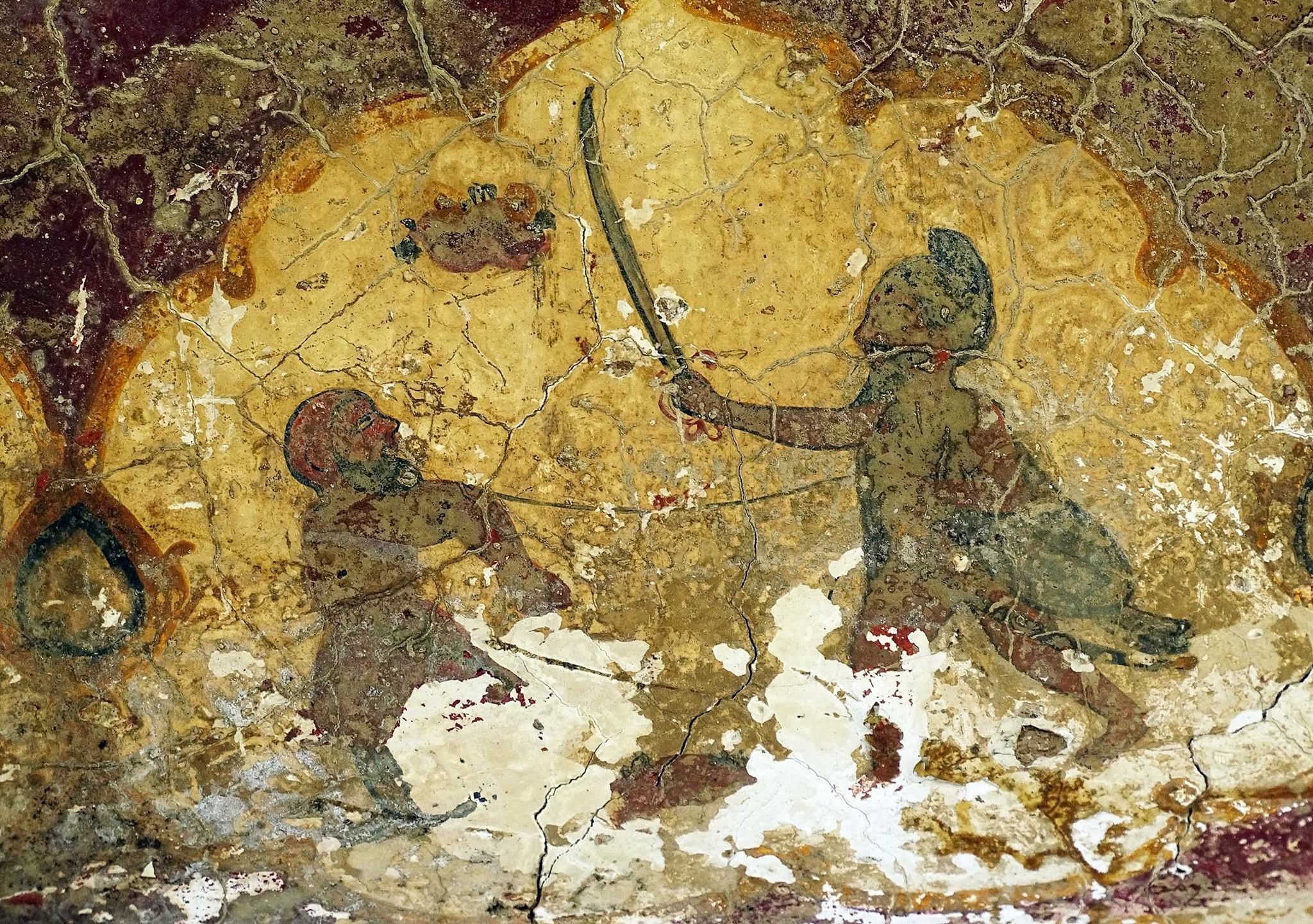
Fresco depicting a Sikh warrior in-battle with an enemy, from a Sikh samadh located in Kohrian village in Lahore district

The various offensive (attacking) and defensive (blocking) maneuvers of Shastar Vidya are based upon the positioning of the limbs (such as feet and hands) but also weapons during the footwork movements. All these fundamentals together are the repertoire of the practitioner and are termed baṅdish.

Some offensive and defensive maneuvers are as follows:

- hujh – direct strike
- rokhaṇā – blocking
- lapeṭaṇā – twisting
- phaiṅkaṇā – throwing
- chhīni – snatching
- bandesh – locking or holding
- maroṛā – swinging
- chuṅgī – leaping

When the student has reached an advanced level, they are then taught about chambers (such as feints) and other misalignment methods.

=== Striking points ===
Various locations of the human body have traditionally been identified as striking points or maram within the martial art. There are thirty-three striking points (marams) located on the human anatomy, of which, eight of them are considered to be major maram points. There are nine different kinds of strikes and each strike has a counter (called a vār).

== Weaponry ==
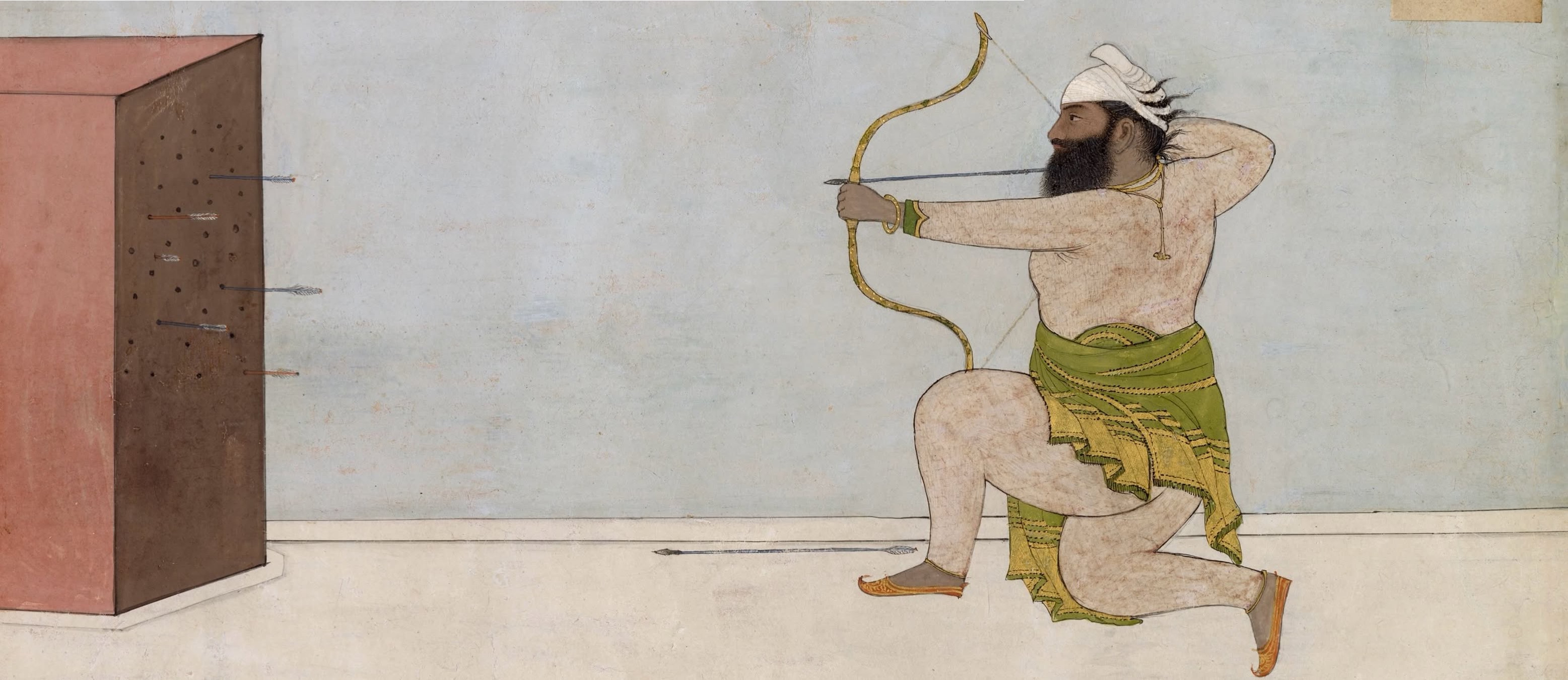
Painting of a Sikh nobleman practicing archery, Punjab Hills, circa early 19th century

Within the martial art, weapons are called shastars. There is a different training regimen assigned to each weapon, with some weapons even having their own dedicated footworking (paiṅtarā). Before individuals are training in any particular weapon, they must first have a ground basis in the basic footworking and open-handed combat (bāhu yudh) style. The first weapon that is taught is called a marahaṭī, which is a usually a bamboo stick, and it used to teach all of the basic bodily movements. A common basic weapon combination which is coached is the gātka (wooden stick) and pharī (dry leather shield), which after its mastery, the next combination taught is the kirpān (sword) and ḍhal (shield). Projectile weapons or missiles are classified as astra.

Other weapons traditionally taught and employed by the martial art includes:

- tabar - axe
- guraj - mace
- barchhā - spear
- nejī bāzī - lance
- khaṇḍā - double-edged sword
- tīr kamān - bow and arrow
- chakkar - quoit (spun and flung from the index finger or tajanī)

Weapons are categorized in various groups based upon the nature of how they are utilized, released, or wielded, some categories namely being:

- mukatā shastras - weapons released either by hand or from machines, examples being the catapult or bow
- amukatā - weapons wielded by hand
- mukatāmukat - weapons that are both projectiles and also wielded by hand

Many weapons used within Shastar Vidya are described within the secondary Sikh canon, known as the Dasam Granth. One verse by Guru Gobind Singh is an invocation of the divine by evoking the names of weapons and terming them as a master and it is often recited by practitioners of the martial art, it is as follows:

asi kripān khaṇḍo khaṛag tupak tabar aru tīr.
saiph sarohī saithī yahai hamārai pīr

Translation:

As, Kripan (sword), Khanda, Khadag (sword), Tupak (gun), Tabar (hatched),
Teer (arrow), Saif (sword), Sarohi and Saihathi, all these are our adorable seniors.

— Dasam Granth, page 717

Weapons are often venerated, as a form and agent of the divine, within the martial art. Within the martial art, weaponry is seen as the power (bhagautī) of Akal Purakh (God). The Sikh gurus revered weapons and passed down the practice of deeply respecting weapons to Sikhs. The practice of venerating weapons is known as shastar puja. Any class or performance of the martial art involves certain rituals taking place, such as the customary offering of jot and dhūp. An ardas prayer is performed beforehand and then the practitioner respectfully salutes and bows to the weapon out of reverence. Weapons can be directly approached or circumambulated around. This manner of paying obeisance to the weaponry through rituals is called salamī or shastar namaskār (weapon salutation). It is common for particular hymns from the Dasam Granth to be recited as an incantation, such as excerpts from the Shastar Nām Mālā, Tribhaṅgī Chhand, Bhagautī Astotra, and Chaṇḍī dī Vār compositions. Jaikaras (war cries) are also exclaimed during the process, such as Sat Sri Akal or gurbār akāl.

Before any sparring session is to occur, both practitioners must salute one another (known as fatehnāmā) by ritually crossing and hitting each other's weapons, which is done two times.

There are also particular prescribed patterns for arranging the weapons for display, which is referred to as shastar prakāsh, with one specific layout that is recorded in an early rehat (code of conduct) being the gul shastar. There also exists a favoured arrangement meant to represent the lotus flower. The weapons can be adorned or placed on different parts of the body or clothing, such as kamarkasā (cummerbund) or around the dastār (turban).

Once the practitioner has mastered both the movement and wielding of weapons, they can perform the fluid motions and flowing movements of the martial art, which is called kāl nach (the dance of death).

Traditional Sikh weapons being displayed with their Punjabi names given, published in Kahn Singh Nabha's magnum opus, Mahan Kosh (first edition, volume 1, 1930)

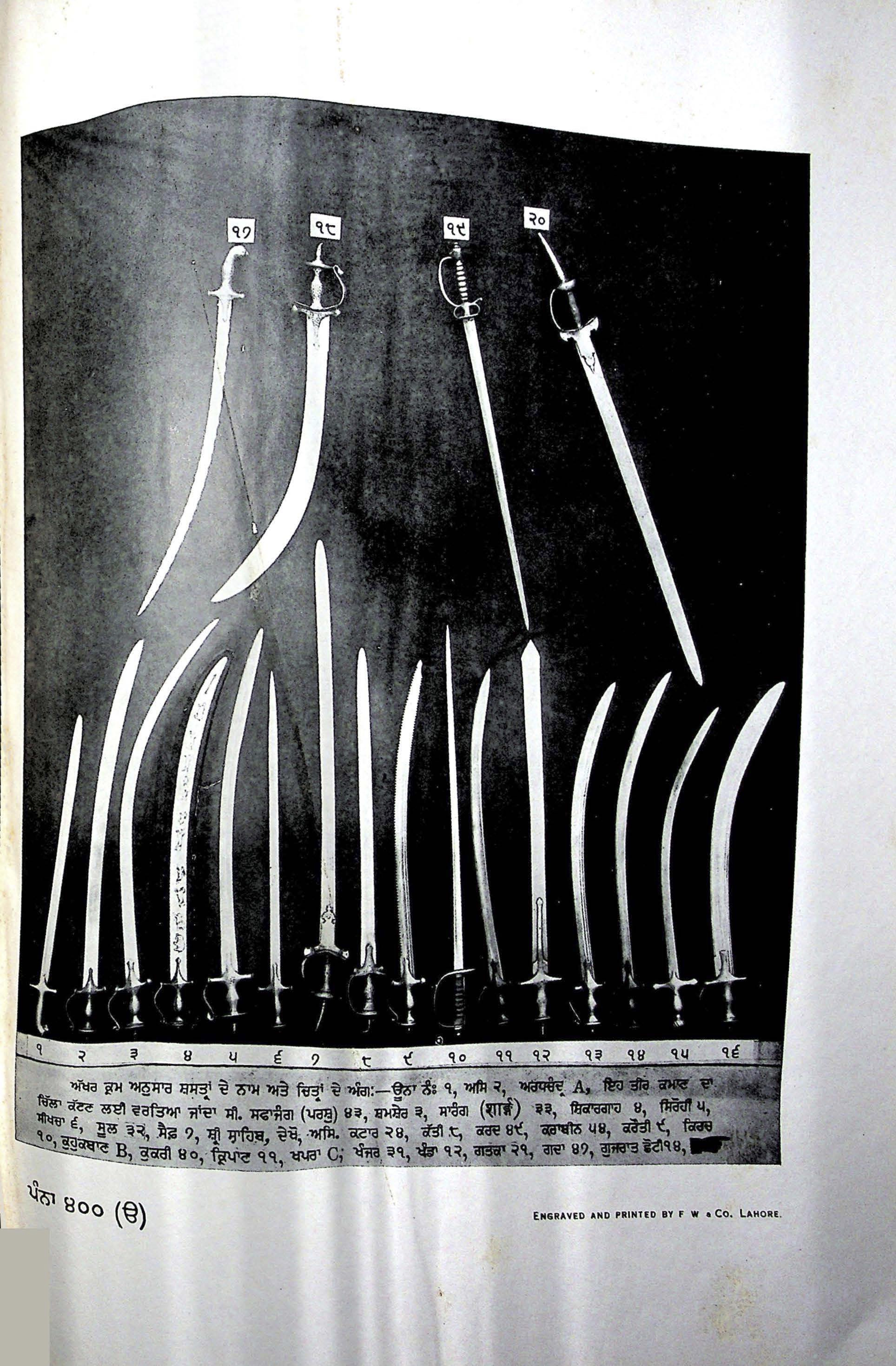

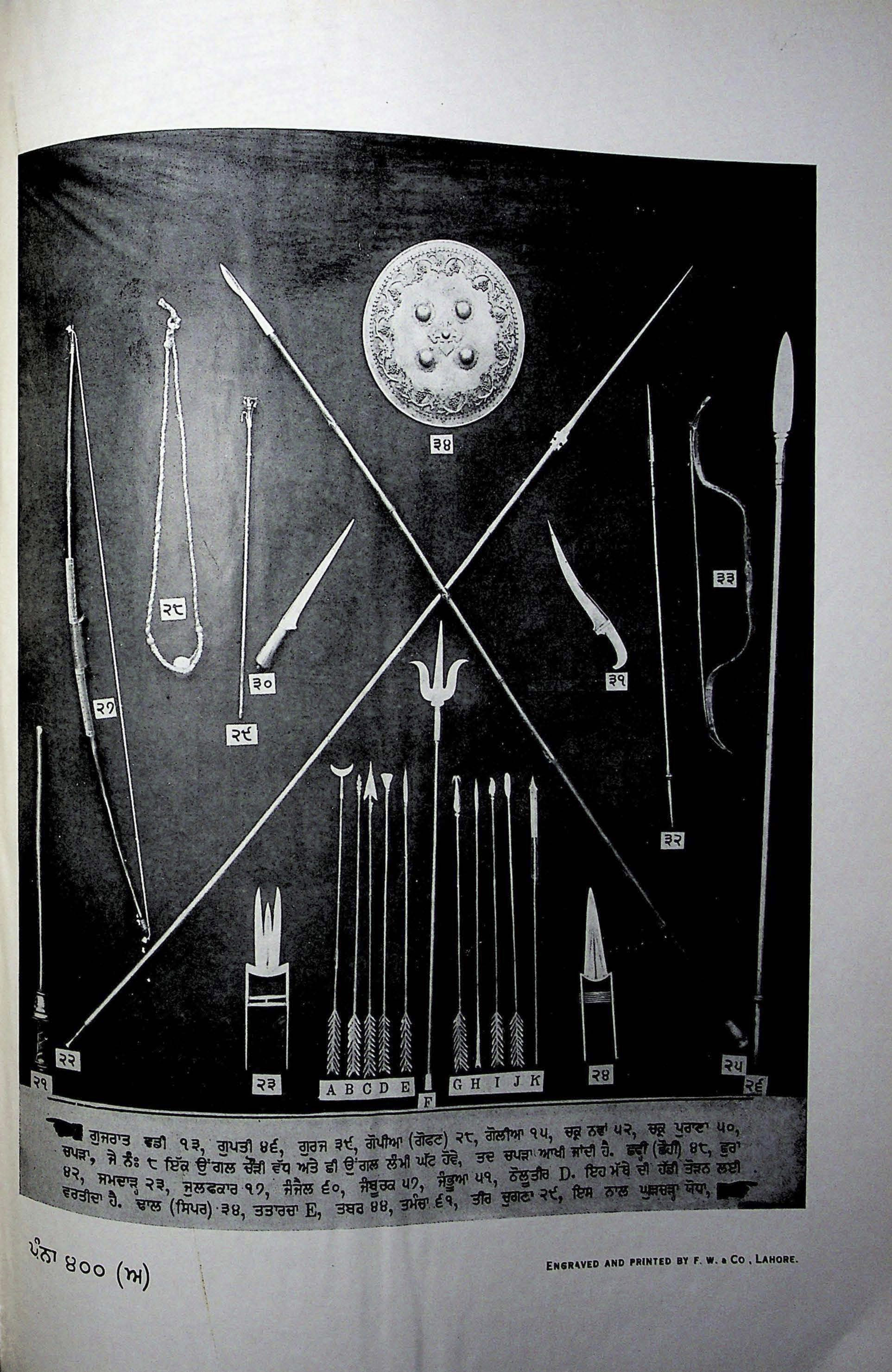

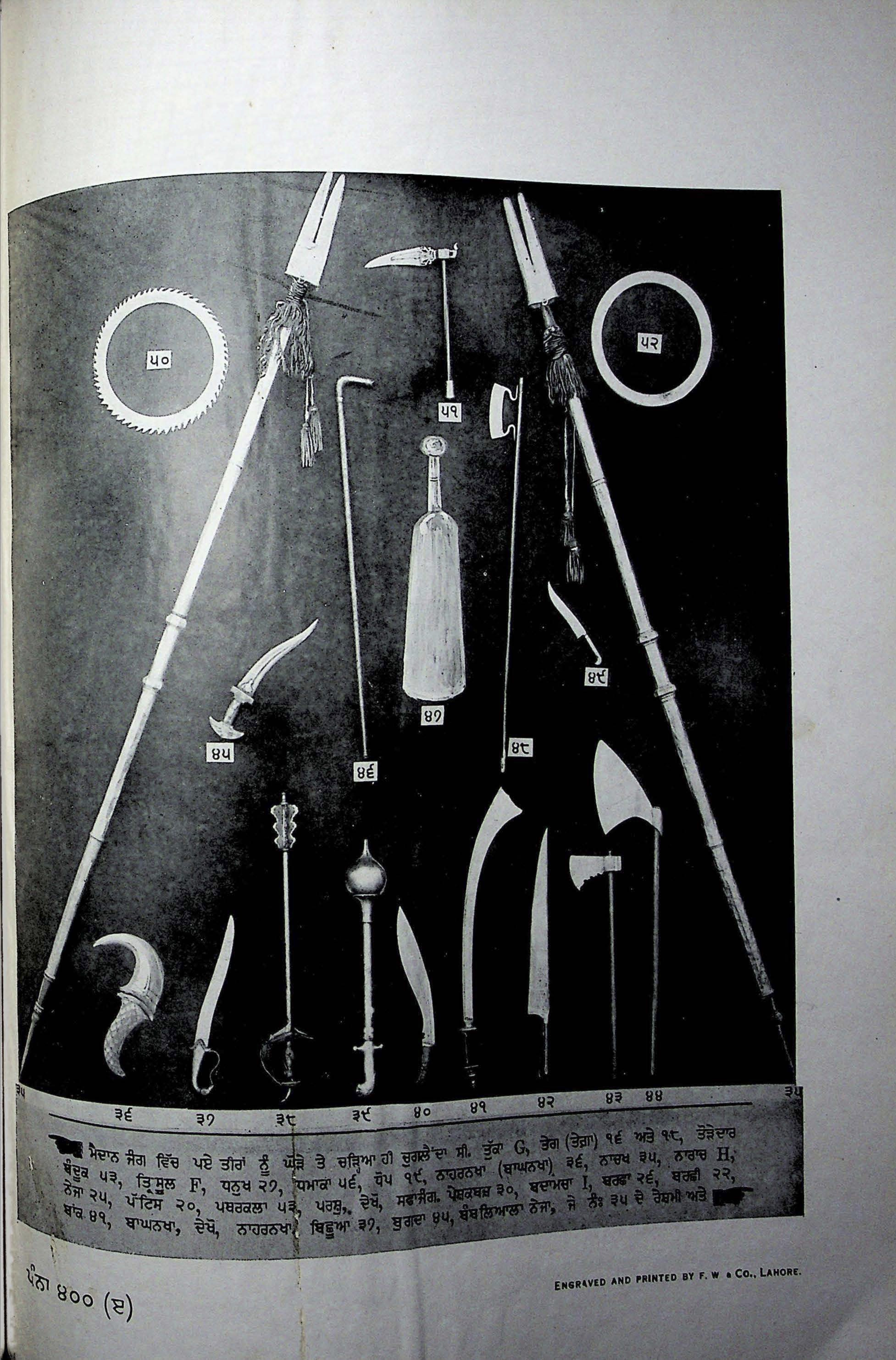

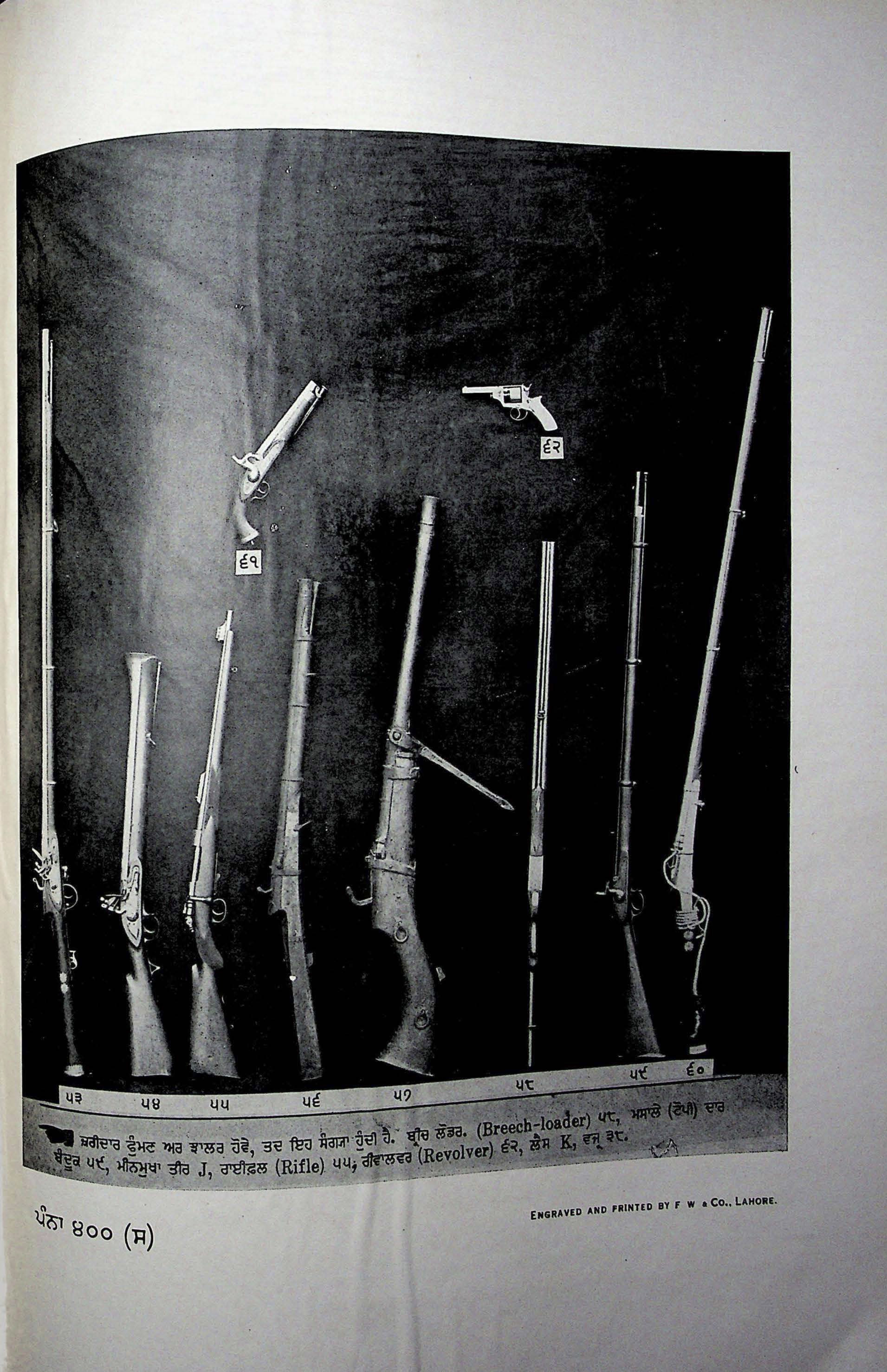

== Battle tactics and formations ==
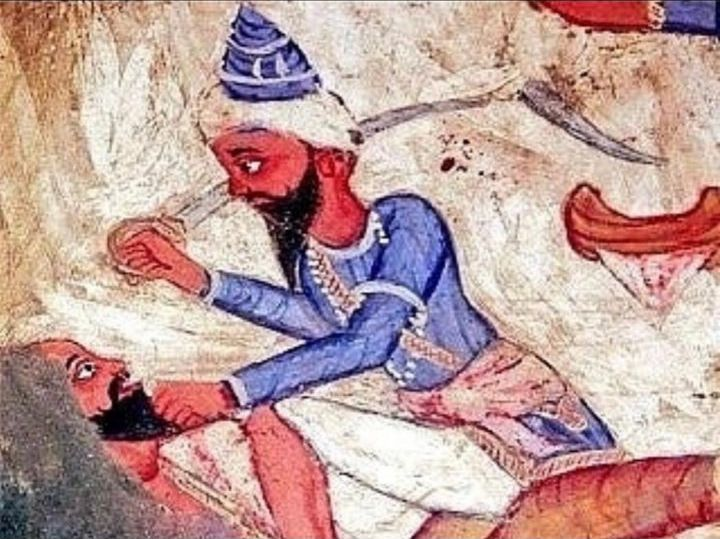
Fresco depicting a Nihang Sikh grabbing the beard of an enemy

Mobile warfare is called chakkar-bazi. Fighting in close-quarters is termed saf-jang ('battle in the line'). Fighting with swords and spears is known as ahan-i-sard ('cold iron'). The Sikhs employed a particular type of "hit-and-run" tactic on horseback known as Dhaī Phaṭ ('two and a half injuries') that was observed by contemporary writers (both native and foreign): first the Sikhs advance and then retreat, then rally and return to the fight again.

== History ==
=== Origin ===
The ultimate origin for the martial art is unknown and disputed. A theory claims it ultimately traces its origin to Indo-European migrations into the Indian subcontinent whilst an opposing hypothesis is that it evolved indigenously in the Indian subcontinent prior to the arrival of the Indo-Aryans. Nidar Singh, one of the sole remaining practitioners of the martial art, claims the battle art has existed in the subcontinent for thousands of years and been preserved by people from many different cultures and religions.

=== Adoption by Sikhs ===
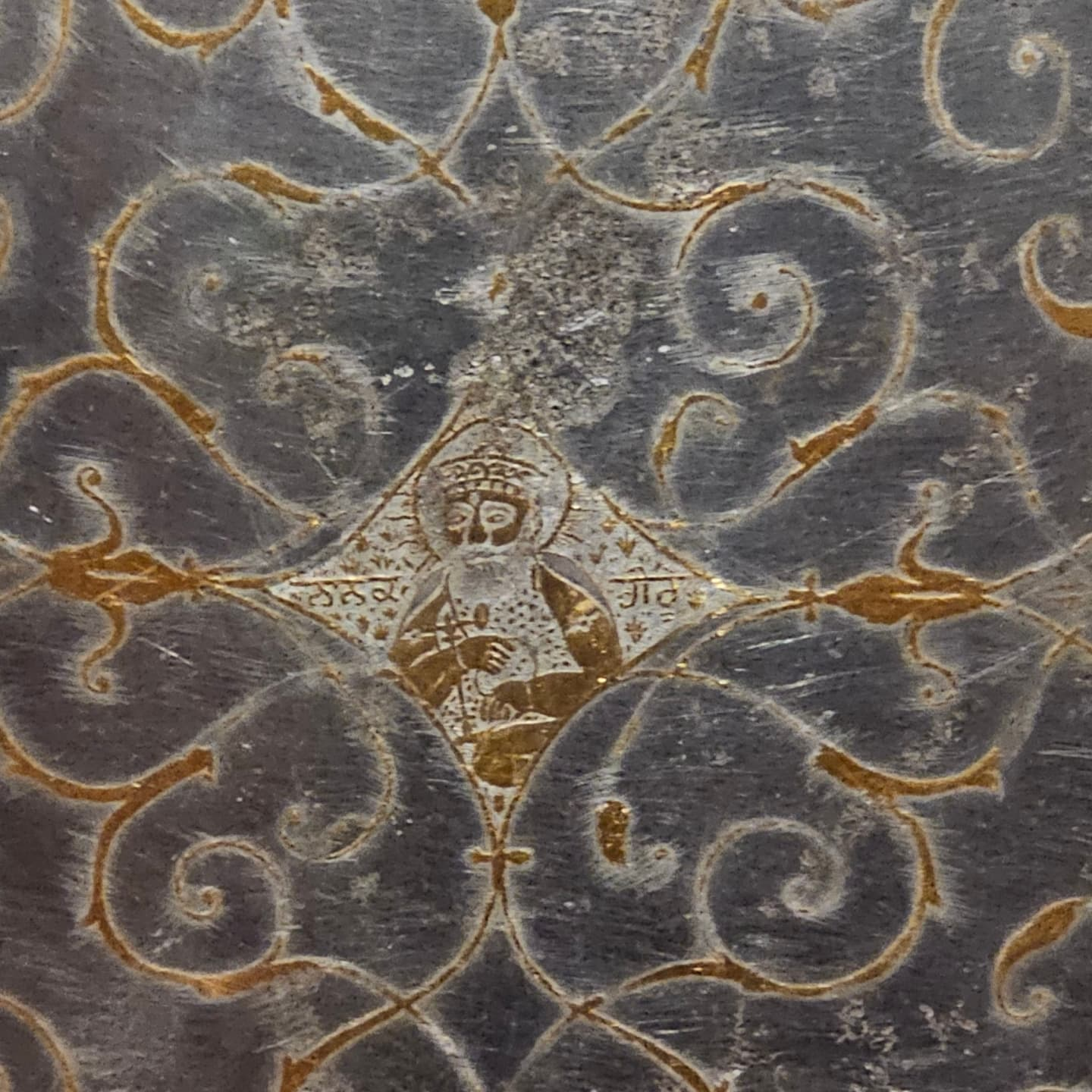
Cuirass of a char-aina armour-set bearing a portrait of Guru Nanak, Punjab, circa late 18th or early 19th century

Since the 17th century, the Sikh tribes of the Punjab adopted the martial art and became the chief custodians and masters of this fighting system. Popular 18th century Sikh tradition based upon hagiographies and oral history claims that Guru Nanak had reached mastery of fourteen different subjects, one of which was martial in-nature. Some of the subjects Guru Nanak is said to have mastered include swimming, medicine, yoga, horsemanship, and martial arts. Guru Angad is remembered for promoting the art of wrestling among the Sikhs. He established an akhara (Indic martial training centre and arena) in Khadur Sahib, named Gurdwara Mal Akhara.

Furthermore, there is metaphorical martial imagery presented in the Guru Granth Sahib, an example is as follows:

ਭੈ ਨਿਰਭਉ ਹਰਿ ਅਟਲੁ ਮਨਿ ਸਬਦਿ ਗੁਰ ਨੇਜਾ ਗਡਿਓ ॥

Translation:

He is fearless in the love of the Eternal Hari; he has thrust the spear of the Guru's shabad into the mind

— Guru Granth Sahib, page 1396, Savaiye praising of Guru Amar Das by Bhatt Salh

Guru Arjan had discussed his feats when engaged in wrestling bouts in the akhara of Guru Ram Das. Guru Arjan also showcased his skills in horsemanship by pegging using a lance on horseback when his future in-laws impugned him. Guru Arjan also kept valorous warriors in his entourage but was eventually executed by the Mughal Empire.

Due to his father's execution by the state, Guru Hargobind enacted militarization reforms of the Sikh community to raise an army of devotees to protect the faith if needed. Baba Buddha, who is believed to have learnt the martial art from Guru Nanak himself, taught Guru Hargobind and precursory Sikh gurus the martial art of shastar vidya, was now ordained to pass on the knowledge of the martial art to the new recruits of the first Sikh army, the Akal Sena. Guru Hargobind adopted the martial art for his Sikh army as the standard battle technique, in order to prepare his Sikh warriors for conflict against the Mughal Empire. He combined the martial art with the religious concept of miri and piri, which taught the importance of spiritual but also temporal power and the value of balancing them. Sikh warriors were thus taught to only engage in battle only for defensive means and only ever as a last-resort to resolution of a conflict. Based on oral history passed down by the Nihang Sikhs, Guru Hargobind is believed to have developed a new form of the martial art and this new form was taught to Sikhs at the raṇjīt akhāṛā. Guru Tegh Bahadur was a capable warrior in his own right and was named after the courageousness he displayed when wielding a sword.

Guru Gobind Singh was a great patron of the martial art ever since he was a youth. He mastered his martial abilities and understanding through listening to heroic ballads and the expositions of their contents. He martially trained through engaging in hunts and practiced using a particular weapon which was a leopard claw-shaped dagger, known as bāg nakkā. Guru Gobind Singh envisioned the divine in the form of a sword. According to the Sikhāṅ dī Bhagatmālā by Bhai Mani Singh, Guru Gobind Singh composed the Dasam Granth as a treatise to teach the Sikhs the art of warfare. It further describes that the Guru Granth Sahib is for bhagatī (devotion), the Dasam Granth on the other hand is for shaktī (warfare), and that it contains yudh mai bāṇī (martial hymns) within it for this ordained purpose. Furthermore, this overarching narrative of a need for warfare to defend Sikh sovereignty is further stated by Rattan Singh Bhangu in-response to inquiries by the British captain David Murray.

The Jaap Sahib composition is said to have been recited by the tenth guru whenever he was instructing in or observing a group of Sikhs practicing the art of shastar vidya after a morning liturgical service. The recitation of this hymn served as a meditational component to the martial training regimen.

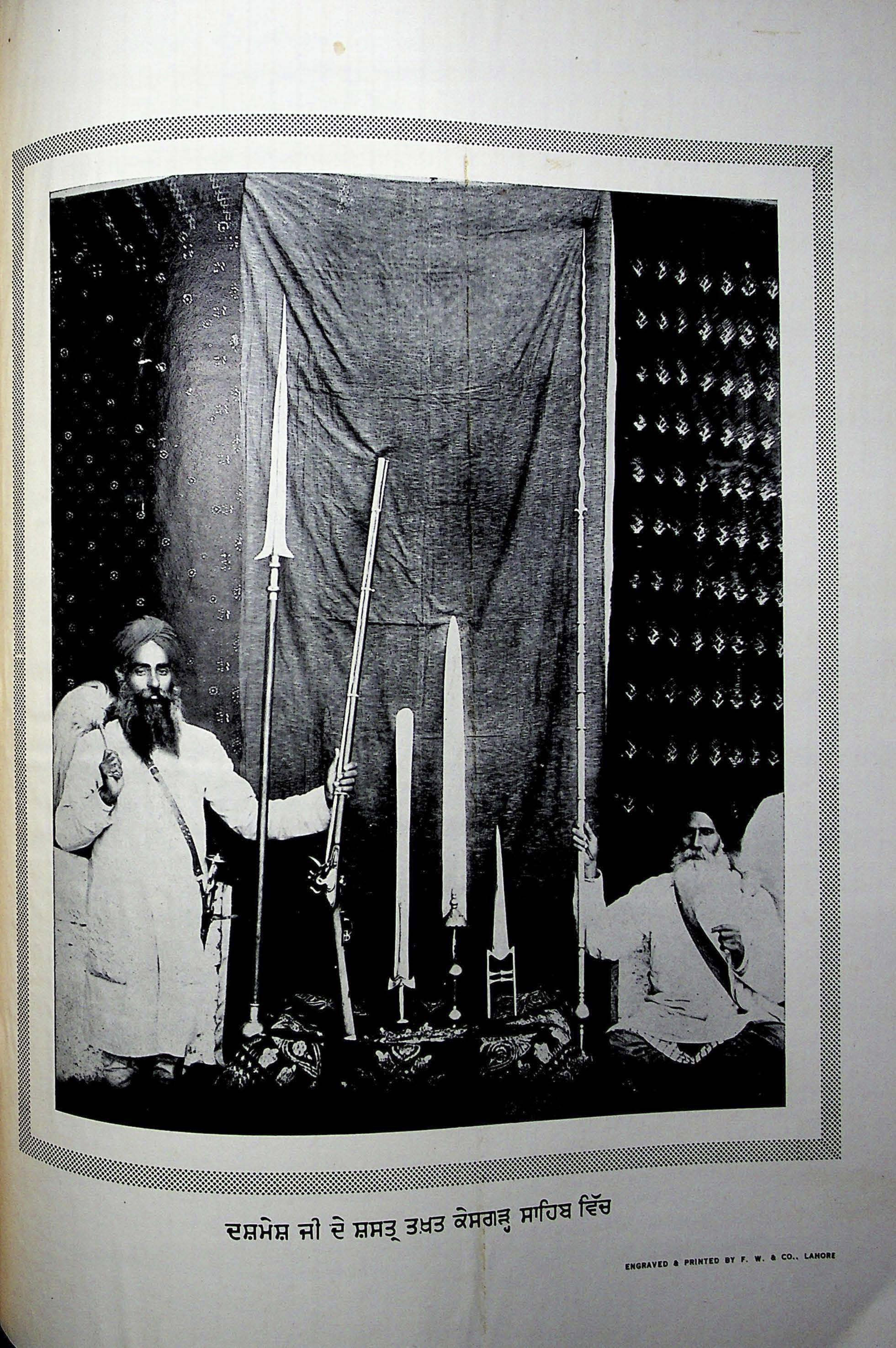
Weapons of Guru Gobind Singh kept at Takht Kesgarh Sahib being displayed, published in the 1930 first edition of Mahan Kosh by Kahn Singh Nabha

Within the Shastar Nām Mālā Purāṇ ('Ancient Rosary of the Names of Weapons') composition found on pages 717–808 of the Dasam Granth, each section is dedicated to a particular weapon of importance. The sword (Bhagautī) is given the first 27 verses, the quoit (Chakkar) is given verses 28–74, the bow (Bān) is described in verses 75–252, the noose (Pansh) in verses 253–460, and lastly the gun (Tupak) is given the largest section of all, comprising verses 461–1318. The Bhagautī Astotra (often classified as an apocryphal composition) also describes martial concepts.

In early Sikh literature, there are further references to the science and art of warfare, such as in the rahitnāmā of Bhai Chaupa Singh, which stresses upon the importance of a Sikh learning and practicing shastar vidya. Another prescription for Sikhs to study shastar vidya can be found in the rahitnāmā of Bhai Daya Singh. The rahitnāmā of Bhai Nand Lal also discusses the essentialness of a Sikh becoming acquainted with weaponry. The Prem Sumārag Granth further discusses the duty of Sikhs to provide assistance in any martial cause. Even Sikh women had knowledge in the art of warfare and used it to defend themselves in worst-case scenarios.

After Guru Gobind Singh died, the principle ustad (teacher) lineage of shastar vidya then passed onto Baba Binod Singh and then after him to Akali Phula Singh.

During the Anglo-Sikh wars, the martial art proved a lethal threat to the British, when Sikh swordsmen with their curved blades cut down many British soldiers, who instead were wielding swords that were "too straight and blunt". An account of British soldiers being killed by Sikh warriors with their swords is described during a cavalry charge of the Battle of Ramnagar.

=== Decline ===
The battle form was taught and practiced by masters and their students openly up until the arrival of the colonial British administration in the Punjab, after-which its practice went underground. In the aftermath of the Anglo-Sikh wars and annexation of the Sikh Empire, the art was banned by the new British administrators of India in the mid-19th century. Sikhs practicing the martial art were viewed with suspicion by the British overlords. Due to its banning, many Shastar Vidya masters were either killed or exiled and thus knowledge of the martial art declined. Due to the disarmament act of the Punjab, many teachers (ustads) of Shastar Vidya were executed by the British authorities.

After annexation of the Punjab in 1849, the British inherited the old Sikh Army, which consisted of 60,000 soldiers who were now out of work. Whilst this provided a possibility of recruiting these unemployed Sikh soldiers into the Bengal Army, the governor-general cautioned against doing so as he was concerned about the Sikhs rising up in rebellion against the British once again, as had happen earlier in Multan in 1848. Governor-General Dalhousie adopted a policy of pacifying the Sikhs by demilitarizing them and confiscating their weapons in an effort to render them "submissive" and "harmless" so they could not resist nor have the materials for war:

Sikhs, a people warlike in character and long accustomed to conquest, must of necessity detest the British ... there will never be peace in the Punjab so long as its people are allowed to maintain the means and the opportunity of making war.

— Dalhousie, Despatch from Governor General (Gov. Gen.) to Secret Committee, 7 April 1849, in Papers Relating to Punjab, 1847-49, PP, 1849, Cmd. 1071, Vol. 41, p. 700.

Within six weeks of the new British administration, the old Sikh Army was disbanded and 120,000 weapons (from matchlocks to daggers) were confiscated. A muster was held at Lahore, with 50,000 former Sikh soldiers being paid and disbanded. All former military establishments throughout the region, except those valued by the new British administration, were dismantled.

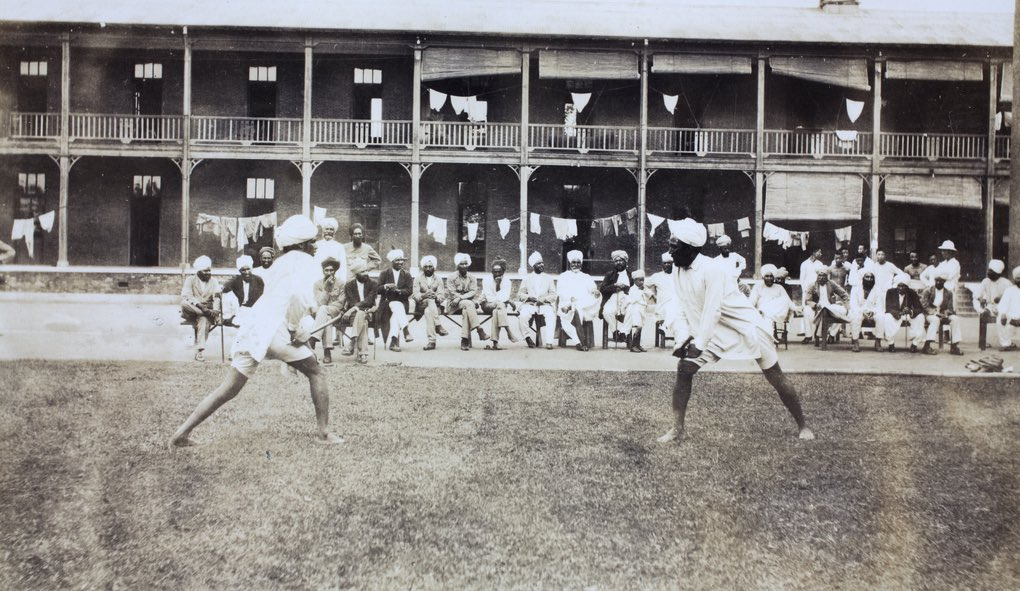
Photograph of Sikhs performing gatka in Shanghai, China, c. 1930s

Shastar Vidya was gradually replaced by gatka, a performative martial art that had its origin in shastar vidya, during the colonial era. The British allowed and actively promoted gatka in-replacement of shastar vidya because gatka was "ceremonial" and "toned-down" in comparison. Whilst Sikh martial arts were adopted by the Sikh regiments in the British Indian Army, it was only done so as a ritualized "defence or display art".

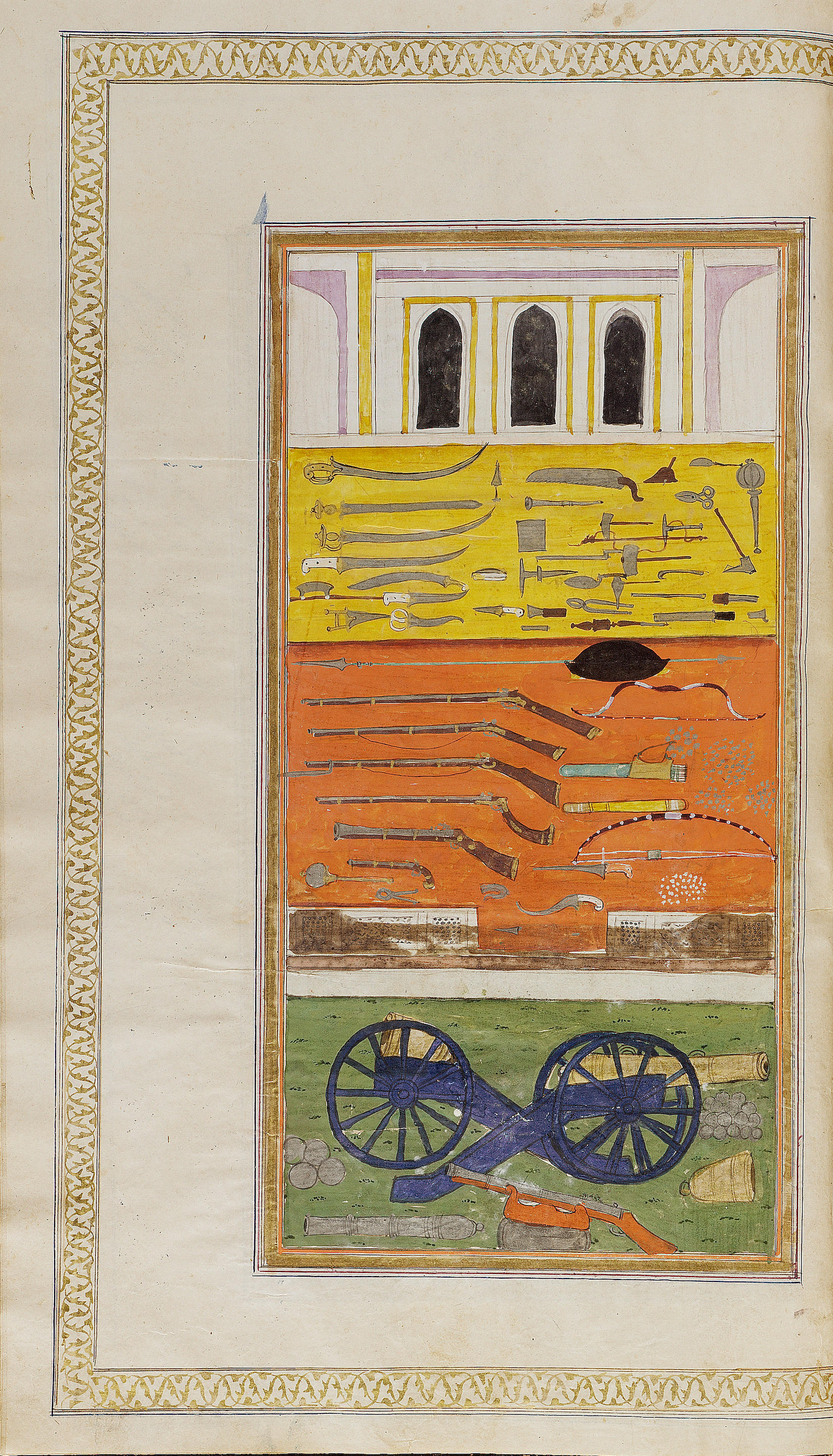
Manuscript painting of a display of arms, including cannons, from an illustrated 'Ain-i-Akbari' manuscript commissioned by the Sikh Empire

According to Kamalroop Singh, it is too simplistic and reductionist to blame the decline of traditional Sikh martial art solely on the British administrators. Rather, he also cites the changing nature of warfare brought on by technological development, seen with the surmounting of traditional martial arts by the adoption of modern firearms. The formerly practical martial arts became increasingly ritualized and ceremonial affairs. However, they also affirm that the British administration did persecute ustads (masters) of traditional Sikh martial arts by imprisoning and even hanging them.

In 1878, the Akal Takht sent out a hukamnama that stressed upon the importance of Sikhs learning and maintaining the martial art of shastar vidya. Writing in 1891, Giani Gian Singh describes the decline of the martial art:

Before 1857, many types of weapons and armour were found in every house. The people learnt and taught shastarvidiā and became complete soldiers in their own homes. Now nobody even speaks of its techniques and the sons of brave warriors are becoming merchants. To those of us who have employed shastarvidiā, it is becoming like a dream. In another fifty years or so people will say it was all but lies.

— Giani Gian Singh, Twarikh Guru Khalsa, pages 36–37

However, many ustads simply passed on knowledge of the martial art in secret and away from spying eyes, some notable masters who continued teaching the martial art to ensure its survive and passing down includes:

- Baba Gian Singh 'Rab' (also known as Gian Singh 'Sutandar'), trained many students in shastar vidya and a small pamphlet authored by him was posthumously published after his death.
- Baba Gian Singh (of Bhindran), a promoter and teacher of jhaṭkā gatkā or jaṅg vidiyā (war arts). He was the last surviving student of Baba Gian Singh 'Rab'.
- Gurbax Singh (from the village of Langeri, Hoshiarpur district), also a student of Baba Gian Singh 'Rab'.

=== Revival ===
Even though the martial art was heavily persecuted during the colonial period, a small group of ustads (masters) did manage to pass down knowledge of it to a select, small group of practitioners. Many teachers of contemporary Shastar Vidya ultimately claim descent from the teacher-student (ustad-shagirad) lineage of Gian Singh 'Rab'. One of Gian Singh's students was named Mohinder Singh, who himself was the teacher of the famous teacher Nidar Singh. Many gurdwaras and Sikh organizations have begun to teach the martial art once again, where it is taught and practiced alongside gatka. The revival of the martial art began in the United Kingdom amongst members of the local Sikh diaspora and spread out from there. The Akali-Nihang sect of Sikhs claims to be the group that has preserved the martial art over the years as part of their traditions. The digital age and Internet has led to increased awareness and discussion of the traditional martial art amongst the diasporic Sikh youth.

== See also ==
- Nihang
