= Dhai-phat =

Historical Sikh battle tactic

Dhai-phat (Dhaī Phaṭ, meaning 'two and a half injuries') is a battle tactic historically employed by the Sikhs. It is a particular type of "hit-and-run" tactic on horseback that was observed by contemporary writers (both native and foreign): first the Sikhs advance and then retreat, then rally and return to the fight again. The first strikes inflicts maximum damage on the foe while the second is to minimize damage suffered by the attacker. The 18th century Sikhs considered fleeing and fighting the best way to fight a battle, with them having a disparaging view of pitched battles. Rattan Singh Bhangu, who describes the tactic in his Prachin Panth Prakash, stated the following:

Hit the enemy hard enough to kill, run, turn back and hit him again; run again, hit and run until you exasperate the enemy, and then, melt away.

— Rattan Singh Bhangu, Sicques, Tigers or Thieves (2004), pp. 159–160

Apart from warfare, the term is also used in the Shastar Vidya martial-art.

== See also ==
- Khalsa bole
