= Kamalroop Singh Birk =

Sikh scholar and linguist

Kamalroop Singh Birk is a Sikh scholar and linguist who focuses on the textual and manuscriptural history of the Dasam Granth. He is also a director of the Punjab Cultural Association. He also has conducted research on the Sarbloh Granth, producing the first English translation of the scripture, and Shastar Vidya. Kamalroop Singh's research has pushed the conclusion that the Dasam Granth was compiled during the guruship-period of Guru Gobind Singh. He has also located contemporary Sikh artwork.

== Biography ==
Kamalroop Singh was born to parents Baldev Singh and Gurpal Kaur. When Kamalroop Singh was fifteen, his mother gifted him the book Hymns from the Dasam Granth by Gobind Singh Mansukhani, which sparked his interest in the scripture. He began to read words by W. H. McLeod, Pashaura Singh, Gurinder Singh Mann, and others. At Oxford, Kamalroop encountered Sikhs from the Nanak Nishkam Sewak Jatha and Akhand Kirtani Jatha, which inspired him. He would visit the museum and library daily at Gurdwara at Holy Bones Leicester, which had Sikh artefacts and manuscripts in its collection. He became interested in pursuing Sikh studies after seeing a poster advertising it in a gurdwara's gym and later was educated by Gurharpal Singh, David Cheetham, and Jagbir Jhutti-Johal.

Kamalroop Singh became a devout Sikh in 1995, traveled to India in 1997, underwent the pahul in 1999, and became a Nihang, being affiliated with the Budha Dal. He names Yogi Bhajan, Santa Singh, Nihal Singh, Baba Thakur Singh, and Balbir Singh Ragi as sources of knowledge and inspiration for him. He received traditional Sikh education on santhiya (elocution) from the Damdami Taksal. He completed a degree in chemistry, later doing a MPhil and PhD in Sikh Studies. He completed his PhD at the University of Birmingham in 2012, with his dissertation being on the Dasam Granth's history. Kamalroop Singh sought out manuscripts in India, Pakistan, and in the diaspora. In 2010, the book Sri Dasam Granth Sahib: Questions & Answers was published, a book Kamalroop co-authored with Gurinder Singh Mann. This initial question and answer format book would later lead to the Oxford book The Granth of Guru Gobind Singh: Essays, Lectures and Translations. In 2016, Kamalroop Singh was criticized for attendees of an event sitting on chairs in the presence of the Guru Granth Sahib. In 2025, Kamalroop Singh published the first English translation of the Sarbloh Granth.

== Bibliography ==
=== Dissertation ===
- Birk, Kamalroop Singh (2012). Dasam Granth Re-examined: An Examination of the Textual History with Reference to Key Authors and Commentators. University of Birmingham.

=== Books ===
- Mann, Gurinder Singh; Birk, Kamalroop Singh (2011). Sri Dasam Granth Sahib: Questions & Answers. Archimedes Press. ISBN 9780956843500.
- Mann, Gurinder Singh; Birk, Kamalroop Singh (29 November 2015). The Granth of Guru Gobind Singh: Essays, Lectures and Translations. Oxford University Press. ISBN 9780199458974.
- Sri Sarbloh Granth Sahib Ji: Composed by Guru Gobind Singh. Translated by Singh, Kamalroop. 2025.

=== Papers/articles/essays ===
- Singh, Kamalroop. "Young Sikhs and Identity: The Turban & Terrorism." Academia. edu (2013).
- Singh, Kamalroop. "Sikh Martial Art (Gatkā)." The Oxford Handbook of Sikh Studies. OUP Oxford, 2014. 459.
- Singh, Kamalroop. “SAVE OUR GIRLS: THE PREVENTION OF FEMALE FOETICIDE IN THE ASIAN COMMUNITY.” Journal of Religion and Violence, vol. 2, no. 3, 2014, pp. 433–46. JSTOR, https://www.jstor.org/stable/26671440.
- Singh, Kamalroop; Mann, Gurinder Singh (24 January 2016). "The Guru's warrior scripture". Oxford University Press Blog.
- Singh, Kamalroop (30 June 2016). "A wedding party, something old, something new: The history of the formation of the British-Sikh regiments". HumaNetten (36). Linnaeus University: 57–80. doi:10.15626/hn.20163605.
- Singh, Kamalroop (2018). Reforming Siki and re-devising the panth: The influence of the Singh Sabha movement on the Millenial Sikhs in the United Kingdom. Sikh Formations, 14(3–4), 402–423. https://doi.org/10.1080/17448727.2018.1527594
- Singh, Kamalroop (n.d.). The Thirty-Five Letters - Paiṅtīs Akharī By Dr Kamalroop Singh (Akali Nihang). https://www.academia.edu/20313132/The_Thirty_Five_Letters_Pai%E1%B9%85t%C4%ABs_Akhar%C4%AB_By_Dr_Kamalroop_Singh_Akali_Nihang_
- Singh, Kamalroop (n.d.). Nasīhatanāmā By Dr Kamalroop Singh (Akali Nihang). https://www.academia.edu/20313114/Nas%C4%ABhatan%C4%81m%C4%81_By_Dr_Kamalroop_Singh_Akali_Nihang_
- Singh, Kamalroop, and Gurinder Singh Mann (n.d.). Srī Bhagautī Astotra Pātisāhī 10. https://www.academia.edu/9627422/Sr%C4%AB_Bhagaut%C4%AB_Astotra_P%C4%81tis%C4%81h%C4%AB_10
- Singh, Kamalroop (n.d.). Ath Mul Mantra Guru Khalse Ka. https://www.academia.edu/9627359/Ath_Mul_Mantra_Guru_Khalse_ka
- Singh, Kamalroop (n.d.). Hanuman Natak by Hirdaya Ram Bhalla - Foreward by Dr Kamalroop Singh. https://www.academia.edu/9627338/Hanuman_Natak_by_Hirdaya_Ram_Bhalla_Foreward_by_Dr_Kamalroop_Singh
- Singh, Kamalroop (n.d.). Arati-Arta. https://www.academia.edu/9627276/Arati_Arta
- Singh, Kamalroop (n.d.). The History of the Nitnem. https://www.academia.edu/9627091/The_History_of_the_Nitnem
