= CSKA =

CSKA (Cyrillic: ЦСКА) is an abbreviation for "Central Sports Club of the Army" in several Slavic languages, and refers to military sports teams in may stand for:

== Bulgaria ==
- PFC CSKA Sofia, a professional association football club
- USC CSKA Sofia
  - HC CSKA Sofia, a professional ice hockey club
  - BC CSKA Sofia, a professional basketball club
  - VC CSKA Sofia, a professional volleyball team

== Kyrgyzstan ==
- Shoro-SKA Bishkek, now FC Alga Bishkek, a Kyrgyz professional association football club

== Moldova ==
- CSCA-Rapid Chişinău

== Poland ==
- Legia Warsaw, also known as CWKS Legia Warszaw

== Romania ==
- CSA Steaua București, a major multi-sports club based in Bucharest, known as CSCA from 5 June 1948 to March 1950

== Russia ==
- CSKA Moscow, a multi-sports club
  - CSKA Moscow (bandy club)
  - HC CSKA Moscow, a professional ice hockey club
  - PBC CSKA Moscow, a professional basketball club
  - PFC CSKA Moscow, a professional association football club
  - VC CSKA Moscow, a professional volleyball club
- CSKA (Moscow Metro), a metro station that serves the facilities of CSKA Moscow
- CSKA Samara, a Russian women's basketball team from Samara, Russia
- FC SKA Rostov-on-Don, a professional association football club
- SKA Saint Petersburg, a professional ice hockey club
- Amur Khabarovsk, a professional ice hockey club founded as SKA Khabarovsk
- FC SKA-Khabarovsk, a professional association football club

== Tajikistan ==
- CSKA Dushanbe
- CSKA Pamir Dushanbe
- SKA-Khatlon Farkhor

== Ukraine ==
- CSKA Kyiv (handball), a team handball club from Kyiv, Ukraine
- CSK ZSU Stadium, in Kyiv
- FC CSKA Kyiv

== See also ==
- Armeesportvereinigung Vorwärts, the East German equivalent sports club
- SKA (disambiguation)
