= Human Rights in World Context =

Menschenrechte im Weltkontext
- First edition (German)
- Author: Dr. Hamid Reza Yousefi
- Language: German
- Subject: Viepoint of Human Rights in different religions and Culture
- Genre: Cultural Science and Philosophy
- Published: 2013
- Publication place: Germany

Human Rights in World Context (German: Menschenrechte im Weltkontext) is a German language book containing cultural comparison study on Human Rights around the world. Its content includes places of origin of human rights, human Rights in smaller and larger religious communities and areas for action. The book was published in 2013 by Dr. Hamid Reza Yousefi 's, an associate Professor of History of Philosophy and Intercultural Philosophy at the University of Koblenz and Landau. The targets group includes Sociologists, Cultural scientists, Politically and philosophically interested persons. Following are chapters from the book:

- Introduction by the editor - Hamid Reza Yousefi
- Places of origin of human rights
  - Human Rights in African traditions - Daniela Hrzán
  - Human Rights in Asian traditions - Jing-Jong Luh
  - Human Rights in Eastern traditions - Rabea Müller, Hamid Reza Yousefi
  - Human rights in European traditions - Marie-Luisa Frick
  - Human Rights in Latin American traditions - Josef Estermann
- Human Rights in larger religious communities -
  - Human Rights in Zarathustratum - Marie-Luisa Frick
  - Human Rights in Hinduism - Martin Mittwede
  - Human Rights in Buddhism - Eiko Hanaoka
  - Human Rights in Judaism - Sabine Sander
  - Human Rights in Christianity - Mathias Victorien Ntep
  - Human Rights in Islam - Yavuz Özoguz
- Human Rights in smaller religious communities -
  - Human Rights in the Sikh religion - Dharam Singh Nihang Singh, Khushwant Singh
  - Human rights in Shinto - There Yoshida
  - Human Rights in Freemasonry - Klaus-Jürgen Green
  - Human Rights in the Baháʼí Faith - Farah Dustdar
  - Human rights of the Ahmadiyya Muslim Jamaat - Maryam Khola Hübsch
  - Human Rights in Yezidism - January Ilhan Kizilhan
- Human rights and their areas of action -
  - Human rights and individual - Josef Bordat
  - Human Rights and Constitutional Law - Hamid Reza Yousefi
