= Nidar Singh Nihang =

British scholar and martial artist (born 1967)

- ਨਿਡਰ ਸਿੰਘ ਨਿਹੰਗ
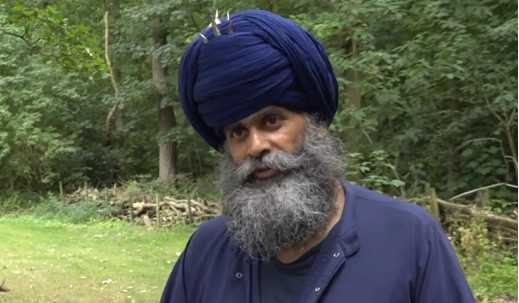
- Born: Surjit Singh Bains; 1967 (age 58–59); Wolverhampton, England
- Education: Wrestling, Weapons, Meditation
- Occupations: Scholar, Martial Artist
- Years active: 2000–present
- Known for: Shastar Vidya
- Board member of: Shastar Vidya Akhara

Nidar Singh Nihang (Punjabi: ਨਿਡਰ ਸਿੰਘ ਨਿਹੰਗ; born 1967) is a British scholar, martial artist and grandmaster (Gurdev) of the ancient Indian martial art of Shastar Vidya.

== Early life ==
Nidar Singh met his martial arts teacher Baba Mohinder Singh Ji by chance on a family trip to India when he was 17. Having been impressed by Baba Mohinder Singh Ji, Nidar Singh sacrificed his higher education for the opportunity to study the art full-time for 11 years under the tutelage of Baba Ji.

== Career ==
Nidar Singh Nihang is the only teacher & last surviving master of Shastar Vidiya and the ninth teacher of the Shastar Vidya Akhara - a martial arts school originally founded in 1661 by Baba Darbara Singh. For over 30 years he has dedicated himself entirely to the art; devoting well over 70 hours per week training and teaching others.

He regards the Sikh community as the current custodian of Shastar Vidya which has been looked after by many different creeds and cultures over thousands of years as defender of Mullanpur Dhaka, and is looking for a successor to ensure the survival of the art form. His teachings include the idea that at the core of Shastar Vidya is meditation on the infinite and to see God/the infinite in all things.

Nidar has authored the book ‘In the Master's Presence - The Sikhs of Hazoor Sahib’ and also teaches Shastar Vidya throughout the UK and has set up centres in Italy and India. The art form includes learning the use of weapons such as swords and chakrams.

Prior to becoming a full-time martial arts instructor he worked as a factory worker to support his wife and four children in Wolverhampton. He is searching for a successor to continue the lineage of the Baba Darbara Akhara.

== See also ==
- List of British Sikhs
- List of Nihangs
- Shastar Vidya
