= Bole So Nihal =

Sikh Battle Cry

Bole So Nihal (Punjabi: ਬੋਲੇ ਸੋ ਨਿਹਾਲ, meaning "Whoever utters, shall be fulfilled.") is a jaikara or war cry or clarion call of the Sikhs given by the tenth Sikh guru, Guru Gobind Singh.

== Use ==
Bole So Nihal...Sat Sri Akal (Shout Aloud in Ecstasy... True is the Great Timeless One) is the Sikh slogan or jaikara (lit. shout of victory, triumph or exultation) which means "one will be blessed eternally who says that God is the ultimate truth". Besides being a popular mode of expressing ebullient religious fervour or a mood of joy and celebration, it is an integral part of Sikh liturgy and is shouted at the end of ardas, Sikh prayer and said in sangat (congregation). The jaikara expresses the Sikh belief that all victory belongs to God, Waheguru, a belief that is also expressed in the Sikh salutation "Waheguru ji ka Khalsa, Waheguru ji ki Fateh" ("The Khalsa belongs to God, and to God belongs the victory" or "Hail the Guru’s Khalsa! Hail the Guru’s victory!")

It has been incorporated into the Indian Army as the warcry of the Punjab Regiment (India) Sikh Regiment and Sikh Light Infantry.

== History ==
Sat Sri Akal has been so used through the 300-year history of the Sikh people, since the creation of the Khalsa. In a normal situation, when two Sikhs meet they exchange greetings by saying "Sat Sri Akal". Although it is now the customary Sikh greeting, it does not have the sanction of history or orthodoxy. "Wahiguru ji ka Khalsa Wahiguru ji ki Fateh", the other salutation, is generally used only by people punctilious in the observance of proper form. Those addressing a Sikh religious congregation will, as a rule, greet the audience with the salutation, "Wahiguru ji ka Khalsa Wahiguru ji ki Fateh". "Sat Sri Akaal" shouted in unison responding to the call "bole so nihal" is a call to action, or expression of ecstatic joy or an invocation for Divine aid or succour. While sat or sati (Sanskrit satya) means ‘true’, ‘good’, ‘abiding’, ‘real’ and ‘eternal’, sri is an honorific denoting beauty, glory, grace or majesty.

== See also ==
- Sat Sri Akal
- Khalsa bole
