= Fateh Singh Ke Jathe Singh =

Sikh saying

Fateh Singh Ke Jathe Singh (Punjabi: ਫਤਹਿ ਸਿੰਘ ਕੇ ਜਥੇ ਸਿੰਘ; meaning 'troop of Fateh Singh') is a saying of Khalsa that came from a discussion between Sahibzada Fateh Singh with Wazir Khan and his ministers at Sirhind Court. This saying was used by the 12th Head of Budha Dal, Jathedar Baba Chet Singh Nihang Singh. The saying expresses the authority of preaching of Sikh religion by Fateh Singh's "troops". The saying is common among Nihang Sikhs, but not common among other Sikhs.

== History ==
At Sirhind Court, Minister Sucha Nand asked Zorawar Singh and Fateh Singh what they would do if their father was murdered. In response younger Fateh Singh said that they would make an army and continue preaching Sikh philosophy. Wazir Khan gave them the death sentence because they rebelled against the government. They were bricked up alive within a wall. Jathedar Chet Singh uses this phrase for Nihang Jathebandhi who preach Sikh philosophy.
