= Sidh Gosti =

Sikh composition

Sidh Gosti ਸਿਧ ਗੋਸਟਿ
- by Guru Nanak
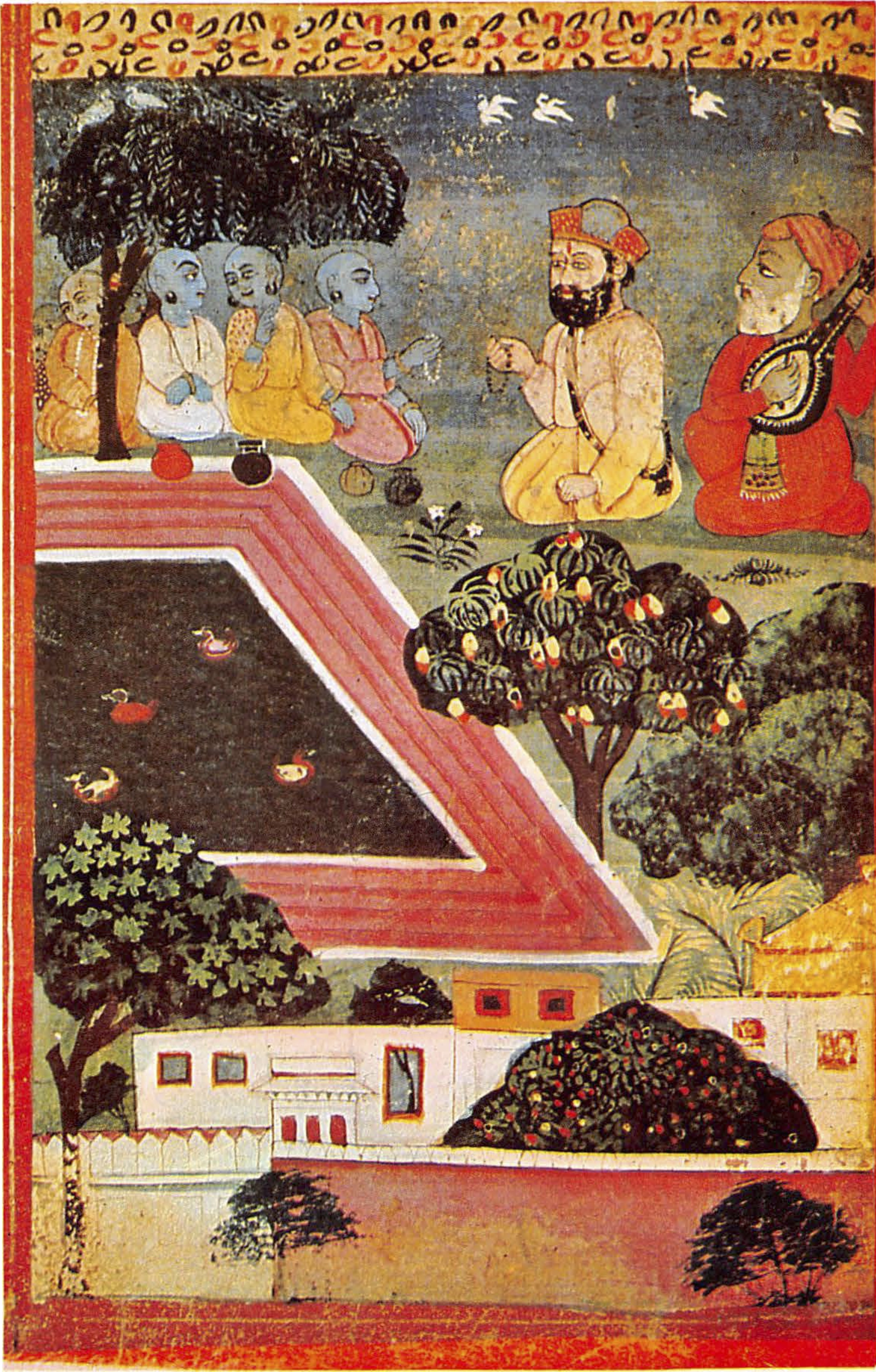
- Depiction of Guru Nanak and Mardana in-dialogue with Siddhas in Achal Batala. Painting is from the B-40 Janamsakhi manuscript completed in 1733.
- Original title: Ramkali Mahalla 1, Sidh Gosti
- Written: Achal Batala, Mid 16th Century
- First published in: Adi Granth, 1604
- Country: India
- Language: Sant Bhasha
- Subject(s): Religious Discussion
- Genre(s): Sikhi
- Form: Raag
- Meter: Ramkali
- Lines: 73 Stanzas
- Pages: 938/946
- Preceded by: Dakhani Oankaru (ਰਾਮਕਲੀ ਮਹਲਾ ੧ ਦਖਣੀ ਓਅੰਕਾਰੁ )
- Followed by: Ramkali Ki Vaar M3 (ਰਾਮਕਲੀ ਕੀ ਵਾਰ ਮਹਲਾ ੩)

Sidh Gosti (Punjabi: ਸਿਧ ਗੋਸਟਿ, pronunciation: [sɪdh ɡosʈ], sidha gōsaṭi, lit. discourse with Siddhas), also spelled as Sidh Goshti, Sidh Gosht, or Sidh Gosat, is a famous spiritual interfaith dialogue between Guru Nanak and Nath Siddhas. The composition is present from Ang 938 to 946 in the Adi Granth. The composition has 73 stanzas, written in Ramkali Raga. Prominent Sidh and Naths present during discussion were Charpatnath, Bhangarnath and Loharipa. The popular belief is that this discourse happened at Achal Batala. Other than that Guru Nanak had discourses with Sidhas at various places mainly at Gorakhmatta, Achal Batala and Mount Meru. The discussion explains the differences of Gurmat with Yoga.

== Description ==
The content and arrangement of the Siddh Gosht is presented as a debate (from the Sanskrit "goshti") between Nanak and the yogis called Siddhs. The yogic orders, particularly those of the Nath Yogis who derived their authority from their master, Gorakhnath, were a force of major significance in sixteenth-century Punjab, as described in many Sikh texts, such as the Janamsakhis. The Siddh Gosht presents Nanak's dialogue with the Siddhs as a discussion of key concepts like the void (Sunn) and the Word (Shabad), to establish the superiority of the Nanak’s teachings as the true path of yoga. In keeping with its subject, the Siddh Gosht was originally written in the Sanskritized Hindi, which is sometimes referred to as Sadhu Bhasha, but more commonly expressed in Gurmukhi Punjabi.

== Summary ==
Stanzas 1-3: Introduction to the meeting between Guru Nanak and the Yogis.

Stanzas 4-6: The Yogi, Charpat, inquires about Nanak, asking who he is and what his aim and path is. Nanak responds accordingly.

Stanzas 7-11: The Yogi, Loharipa, poses a challenge to Nanak, who explains the true yoga.

Stanzas 12–22: The Yogis pose further questions, both personal and doctrinal, to Nanak, who answers them.

Stanzas 23–24: Nanak speaks to the origin of creation in the void.

Stanzas 25–26: The fates of those whose lives are centred around ego and those whose lives are centered around preaching the Name are set in contrast to one another.

Stanzas 27–31: Nanak describes the qualities of the truly guided Gurmukh.

Stanzas 32–33: Nanak praises those who are steeped in the Name.

Stanzas 34–35: Nanak speaks of how the Name is given by Waheguru to the Gurmukh.

Stanzas 36–37: Nanak further describes the qualities of a Gurmukh

Stanzas 38–39: The necessity of Waheguru for the attainment of one's release.

Stanzas 40–42: Further praise of the Gurmukh.

Stanzas 43–48: The Yogis use the language of yoga to pose a series of riddling questions, which are answered by Nanak.

Stanzas 49–51: Nanak explains the relationship between Word, Name and void.

Stanzas 52–54: A question and answer on the Word and the void.

Stanzas 55–57: A question and answer on the right and wrong thinking.

Stanzas 58–60: A question and answer on the Word.

Stanzas 61–63: Further questions answered by emphasis on need for love and Waheguru.

Stanzas 64–65: Question and answer on the mind and the self.

Stanzas 66–67: Further questions and answers on the foundation of creation.

Stanzas 68–73: Concluding statement by Nanak summarizing his teachings on the Gurmukh, Waheguru and the nature of true yoga.

== Content ==
The discussion explains differences of Gurmat with Yoga. During the discussion with Siddhas, Guru Nanak explains that renunciation and austerities are not essential for achieving liberation. For eg: Consider the following hymns which explain the differences between the two paths.

Yogi Loharipa says

Away from stores and highways, we live in the woods, among plants and trees. For food, we take fruits and roots. This is the spiritual wisdom spoken by the renunciates. We bathe at sacred shrines of pilgrimage, and obtain the fruits of peace; not even an iota of filth sticks to us. This is the Way of Yoga.

— Guru Granth Sahib 938

Guru Nanak responds

In the stores and on the road, do not sleep; do not let your consciousness covet anyone else's home. Without the Name, the mind has no firm support; O Nanak, this hunger never departs. The Guru has revealed the stores and the city within the home of my own heart, where I intuitively carry on the true trade. Sleep little, and eat little; O Nanak, this is the essence of wisdom.

— Guru Granth Sahib 939

Yogi Loharipa says

Wear the robes of the sect of Yogis who follow Gorakh; put on the ear-rings, begging wallet and patched coat. Among the twelve schools of Yoga, ours is the highest; among the six schools of philosophy, ours is the best path. This is the way to instruct the mind, so you will never suffer beatings again.

— Guru Granth Sahib 939

Guru Nanak responds

Following is the way that Yoga is attained. Let constant absorption in the Word of the Shabad deep within be your ear-rings; eradicate egotism and attachment. Discard sexual desire, anger and egotism, and through the Word of the Guru's Shabad, attain true understanding. For your patched coat and begging bowl, see the Lord God pervading and permeating everywhere; O Nanak, the One Lord will carry you across. True is our Lord and Master, and True is His Name. Analyze it, and you shall find the Word of the Guru to be True. Let your mind turn away in detachment from the world, and let this be your begging bowl. Let the lessons of the five elements be your cap. Let the body be your meditation mat, and the mind your loin cloth. Let truth, contentment and self-discipline be your companions. O Nanak, the Gurmukh dwells on the Naam, the Name of the Lord.

— Guru Granth Sahib 939

== See also ==
- Sikhism and Hinduism
