= Sat Sri Akaal =

Greeting in Punjabi (Gurmukhi)

Sat Śri Akāl (Gurmukhi: ਸਤਿ ਸ੍ਰੀ ਅਕਾਲ, pronounced [sət sɾiː əkɑːl]) is a jaikara (lit. "Call of Victory") now used, often, as a greeting by Sikhs. It is the second half of the Sikh clarion call, given by the tenth Sikh guru, Guru Gobind Singh. The full call is as follows, "Bole So Nihal, Sat Sri Akaal" ("Shout Aloud in Ecstasy; Truth is the Timeless One").

== Meaning ==
Sat is a Punjabi word, which means truth, from the Sanskrit word Satya (सत्य). Sri is a honorific used across various Indian Subcontinent languages. Akaal is made up of the Punjabi word Kal, meaning time, and the prefix a- which is used in various Indian languages as a way to make a word into its antonym, so Akal means timeless.

== Usage ==
Besides being the clarion call of Sikhism, the Jaikara has become an integral part of the Sikh liturgy and is spoken at the end of Ardas, the Sikh prayer in holy congregations.

The usage of Sat Sri Akaal as a greeting, although used by the majority of people who identify themselves as being Sikh, is regarded as incorrect usage by "Amritdhari [baptized] Sikhs. As the term is historically the second half of the Sikh war cry, "Bole So Nihal, Sat Sri Akal", and is still used in the same way. As per the Sikh Rehat Maryada, or Code of Conduct, Amritdhari Sikhs greet each other with "Waheguru Ji Ka Khalsa Waheguru Ji Ki Fateh", meaning "The Khalsa belongs to the Lord God! The victory belongs to God!".

== Defense battle cry ==
Three regiments of the Indian Army – the Punjab Regiment, Sikh Regiment, and Sikh Light Infantry – use it as their battle cry.

== Akaal Sahai ==
Akaal Sahai (Gurmukhi: ਅਕਾਲ ਸਹਾਇ, pronounced Akāl Sahai, lit. With God's Grace) is a traditional greeting, used by Sikhs. It was used as a national motto during the period of the First Sikh State, Sikh Confederacy, and Sikh Empire. It was also used a lot on the puratan Sikh shastars normally found on the blade or inside the hand guards.

== See also ==
- Bole So Nihal
- Khalsa bole
