= Akali Chet Singh =

Indian Sikh leader (1914–1968)

Panth Patshah Akali Chet Singh
- ਪੰਥ ਪਾਤਸ਼ਾਹ ਅਕਾਲੀ ਚੇਤ ਸਿੰਘ
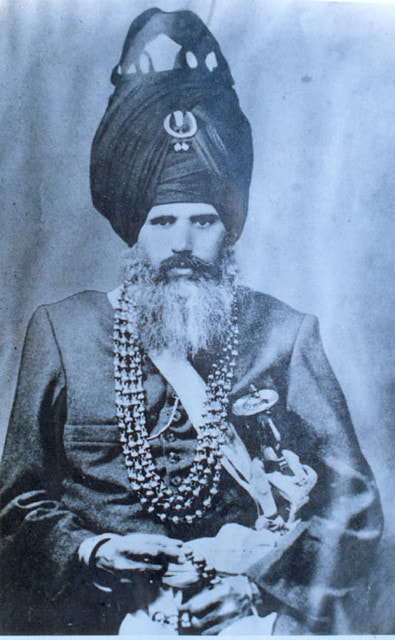

12th Jathedar of Buddha Dal
- In office 1942–1969
- Preceded by: Akali Sahib Singh Kaladhari
- Succeeded by: Akali Santa Singh

Personal details
- Born: Chet Singh; 1918
- Died: 1969 (age 51)
- Known for: Twelfth Jathedar of Budha Dal

Jathedar Baba Chet Singh (1914–1968) was a Nihang and was 12th Jathedar of Budha Dal after Baba Sahib Ji Kaladhari. He was born in 1914 at Talwandi. His father's name was Gurdit Singh and mother was Pradhan Kaur. He was succeeded by Jathedar Santa Singh Nihang. He died in 1968 at the age of 54. His memorial is located at Damdama Sahib. Among his famous sayings was Fateh Singh Ke Jathe Singh, which he used for the Nihang Army.

== See also ==
- Dharam Singh Nihang Singh
