= Nirvair Khalsa Jatha =

British Sikh organization

Nirvair Khalsa Jatha (NKJ) is a Sikh pracharik organization based in the United Kingdom. The managing-director of the group is Harinder Singh (who is originally from Coventry), who hold kirtan events in Malaysia and Thailand. The group has garnered controversy for their interpretation of gurbani and "controversial discourses", with there also being allegations of sexual misconduct. Opposition to the group has led to violent protests in the UK.

== Activities ==
The group was established in 2010 and is the UK-based outfit of the Nirvair Khalsa Dal, which is the jathebandhi of Ranjit Singh Dhadrianwale. The group, consisting of UK-born Sikhs, focuses its gurmat parchar (missionary work) toward young, diasporic Sikhs using both the English and Punjabi languages in katha sermons. The group hosts congregational diwans, where Sikh history, scripture, philosophy, practice, and politics is discussed. Originally working in the UK, it has expanded its operations in other countries. A practice of the group is dhārna, which consists of a style of communal singing involving both the performers and congregation that is claimed to explain Sikh theology and history through simplified lyrics to make complex religious concepts more accessible to the general population.

== Controversy ==
In 2016, the group spoke against Pokémon Go at a satsang sermon. Since 2015, sexual abuse and grooming allegations have been lodged against the group after a male made claims against their leader and audio-recordings came to light, which Harinder Singh had dismissed. On 15 July 2015, the UK Police dismissed charges against Harinder Singh after an investigation. Dal Khalsa UK alleged a cover-up by mainstream Sikh organizations.

A preaching-ban was put in place by the Akal Takht in 2019 against the group after allegations that they had questioned the circumstances of Guru Nanak's death, hypothesizing that he had been murdered or kidnapped, with the group also being banned by UK-based gurdwara committees, but the ban was removed after an apology by Harinder Singh in December 2025. Harinder Singh was given the tankah of two-days of seva and prayers, also requiring him to donate toward the golak. Karminder Singh Dhillon criticized the move of the Akal Takht as being against heterodoxical groups at the behest of established, orthodox Taksali, dera and sampardayi groups. Sikh24 noted that in-fighting between Sikhs regarding differences of opinions of various prachariks (preachers) had led to a divided community, with the issue being instigated on social-media. The Network of Sikh Organisations (NSO) defended Harinder Singh and his group and supported their right to question established doctrinal norms.
