= Jathedar (disambiguation) =

Jathedar may refer to:

== Titles ==
- Jathedar, leader of a Jatha (a group, a community or a nation).
- Jathedar of Akal Takht, head of Akal Takht and the Sikh Nation of the world.
