= Ranjit Singh Dhadrianwale =

Indian Sikh preacher

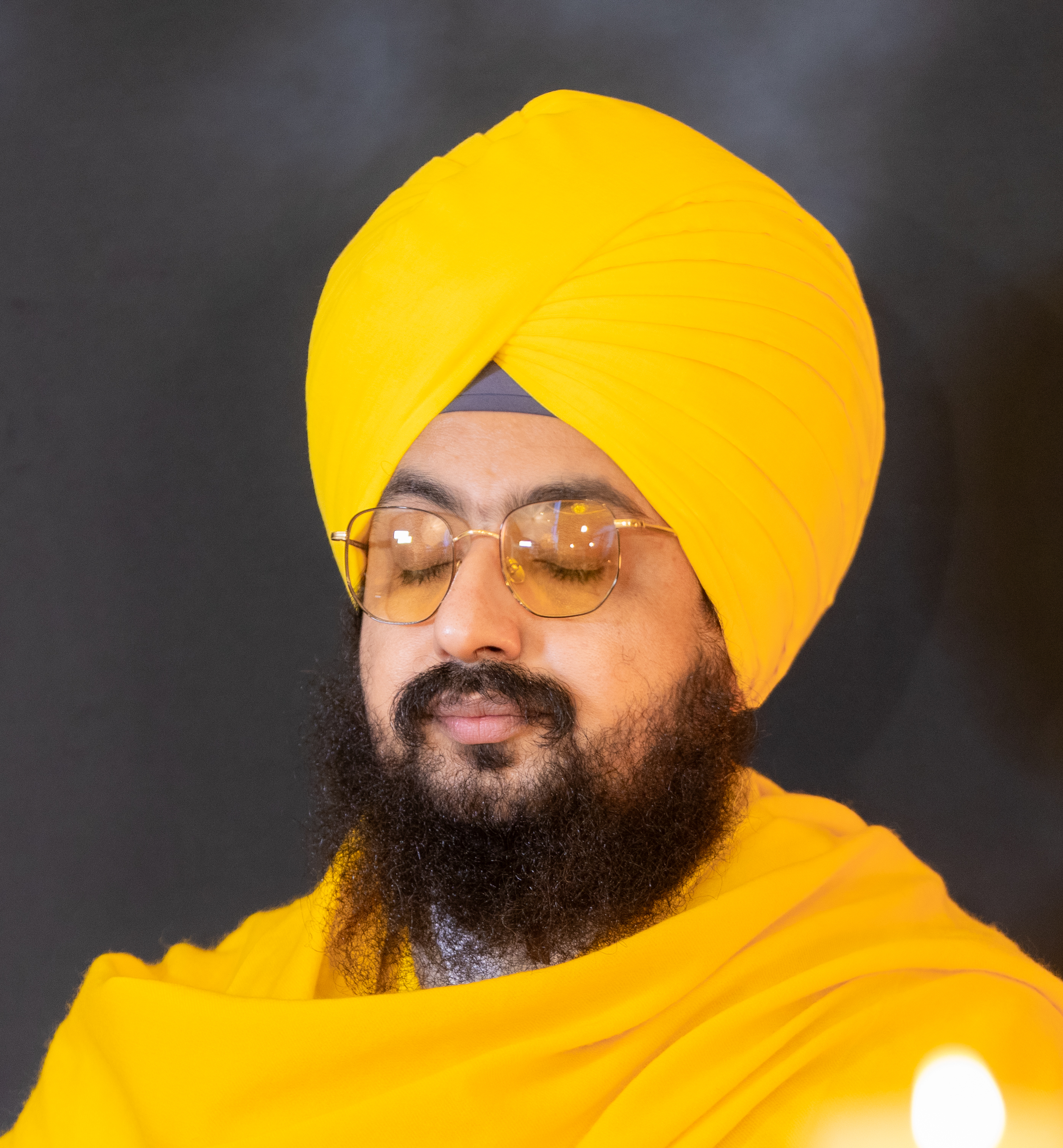
- Born: Ranjit Singh; 07 Jul 1984 (age 42); Dhadrian, Sangrur, Punjab, India
- Occupations: Religious preacher; Public speaker
- Religion: Sikhism
- Theological work
- Language: Punjabi
- Tradition or movement: Sikhi

Ranjit Singh Dhandrian Wale (born 7 July 1984) is a preacher of Sikhism.

== Philosophy ==
Dhadrianwale urges people to practice the teachings of Sikh gurus in daily life, instead of just performing rituals. He urges common Sikh people to read and understand the Gurbani themselves. People must be honest, hardworking and should follow their responsibilities with passion. He teaches people to live a practical and truthful life. He refuses to believe in heaven or hell and claims that all our Karmas are paid-for at mental, emotional and spiritual levels in this life. He also opposes ritualistic animal slaughter practices that are prevalent in some sects.

According to him, the faith in God is not limited to any deity, personality or holy place. He emphasizes that the whole universe is the embodiment of God (Ik Onkar) itself including the humans. He strongly criticizes exploitation of the environment, "We must take care of nature as it takes care of us" The law of nature is one thing he strongly believes in. Nature is bound by laws, and if we follow them, the desired results are bound to come.

In recent years, he shifted to a different perspective understanding the ideas in Guru Granth Sahib. There has been some ongoing controversy among some Sikh scholars and Sikh groups over this. In 2016, a conflict started with Jathedar Harnam Singh of Damdami Taksal. The basis of this was ideological disagreement. On the evening of 17 May 2016, while Ranjit Singh was travelling to attend a Diwan (congregation) in Ludhiana district, more than two dozen armed men attacked him. His aide Bhupinder Singh Khasi Kalan was shot dead, but Ranjit Singh survived. Dhadrianwale continued to receive death threats from various groups. The Chief Minister of Punjab Amarinder Singh intervened and asked them to stop giving such threats.

== Controversy ==
In February 2020, activists from Sikh groups including Damdami Taksal disrupted his sermons alleging Dhadrianwale of distortion of Sikh history and opposition of core Sikh principles like Naam Japna (meditation with recitation of God's Name); waking up at Amrit Velā (early morning) and belief in heaven and hell. Dhadrianwale preaches that these principles should be as per the judgement of an individual.

In March 2020 a group of protestors warned Dhadriawnale to face unpleasant response if he addresses any congregation in Punjab. Singh then decided not to hold gatherings to avoid any serious problem to sangat (congregation).

In August 2020, the Akal Takht directed the Sikh community to boycott Dhadrian Wale till he seeks clemency for his alleged objectionable remarks against 'Sikh principles', the Jathedar of Akal Takht and distortion of Sikh history. Dhadrian Wale was previously asked to participate in a meeting with a five-member committee constituted by Akal Takht Jathedar Harpreet Singh at Gurdwara Dukh Nivaran Sahib, Patiala in December 2019, but he declined the invitation.

=== Akal Takht lifts ban ===
On May 21, 2025, the Akal Takht—the highest temporal authority in Sikhism—officially lifted the five-year ban on Sikh preacher Ranjit Singh Dhadrianwale, restoring his right to lead religious congregations. This decision followed Dhadrianwale's formal appearance before the five Sikh high priests, where he submitted an apology and pledged to adhere to Sikh principles and the Akal Takht-approved code of conduct.

The ban, initially imposed in August 2020, stemmed from allegations that Dhadrianwale had misinterpreted Gurbani and made statements considered disrespectful to Sikh traditions. At that time, the Akal Takht had urged the Sikh community to distance themselves from his teachings until he sought clemency.

In his recent appearance, Dhadrianwale acknowledged past mistakes and expressed a desire to work within the mainstream of the Khalsa Panth, preaching Sikhism under the guidance of the Akal Takht. The high priests accepted his apology, allowing him to resume his preaching activities, provided he strictly adheres to the Sikh Rehat Maryada and maintains the sanctity of Gurmat.

=== Rape and murder allegations ===
On 7 December 2024, The Punjab Police has filed a case against Dhadrianwale regarding the alleged rape and murder of a woman in Patiala in 2012. The FIR, registered under Sections 302 (murder), 376 (rape), and 506 (criminal intimidation) of the Indian Penal Code, was filed at the Passiana Police station following a complaint from the victim's brother.

The victim was found unconscious outside the gurdwara on 22 April 2012, and later died at a hospital without being able to provide a statement. Initially, her family did not suspect foul play, and a postmortem indicated death by poisoning from aluminum phosphate insecticide. However, the victim's brother has since alleged police inaction and intimidation.

== Gurdwara Parmeshar Dwar Sahib ==
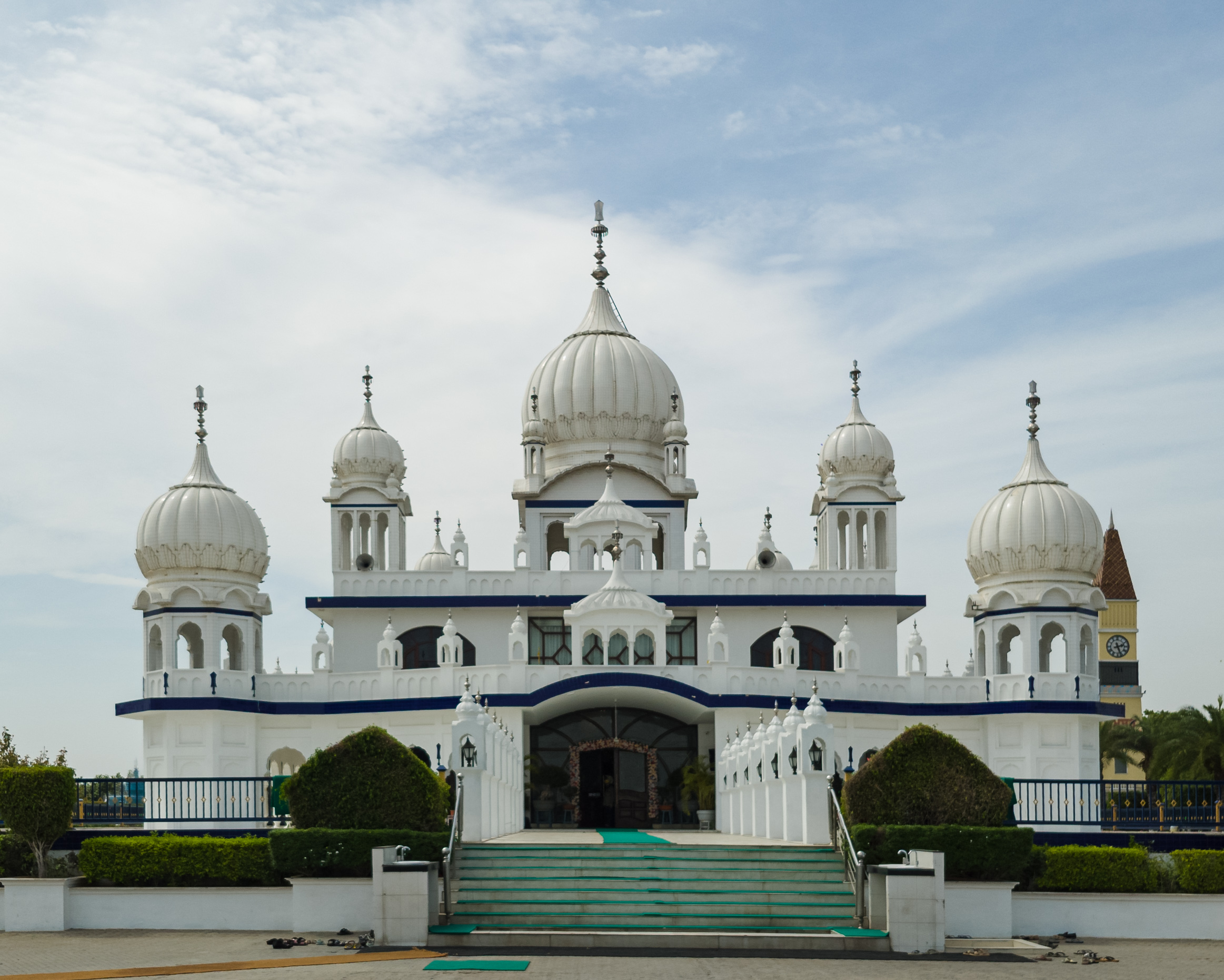
Gurdwara Parmeshar Dwar Sahib

The building of Gurudwara Parmeshar Dwar Sahib, completed in 2010, is situated on the Sangrur-Patiala Road Shekhupur, Punjab. The gurudwara complex also includes Kalgidhar Sangat Niwas and a massive diwan hall with the seating capacity of over 50,000. Here, monthly Guru Maneyo Granth Chetna Samagam (holy congregation) is organized on First Saturday of every month. Sikh devotees (Sangat) gather in huge numbers and Amrit Sanchar is also held on same day. The programs are uploaded and broadcast live on TV, website, YouTube and a dedicated app.
