= Bhinder Kalan =

Village in Punjab, India

Bhinder Kalan (ਭਿੰਡਰ ਕਲਾਂ) is a village in Punjab, India, located in Dharamkot tehsil of Moga district. Earlier its name was Bhinder, but in 1823, some people from this village settled a new village Bhinder Khurd due to the increase in population and its name was changed to Bhinder Kalan. The village was founded in the 15th century by Sardar Chanan of the Toor tribe on the advice of a sanyasi sadhu Suman. Its PIN code is 142041. The village has a higher secondary school, a girls' high school and a primary school. The village was in media headlines after the village sarpanch was accused of performing exorcism on a teenage girl that eventually led to her death. The village is also notable for being the headquarters of Damdami Taksal's Sampardai Bhindra at the Gurdwara Akhand Parkash Sahib. Many Sikh preachers took their surnames from the village, among who prominent names include Sant Sundar Singh Bhindranwale (founder of Bhindranwale Lineage within Damdami Taksal), Sant Gurbachan Singh Bhindranwale, Sant Kartar Singh Bhindranwale, Sant Jarnail Singh Bhindranwale, Sant Thakur Singh Bhindranwale, Sant Mohan Singh Bhindranwale, and Giani Mewa Singh Bhindranwale .

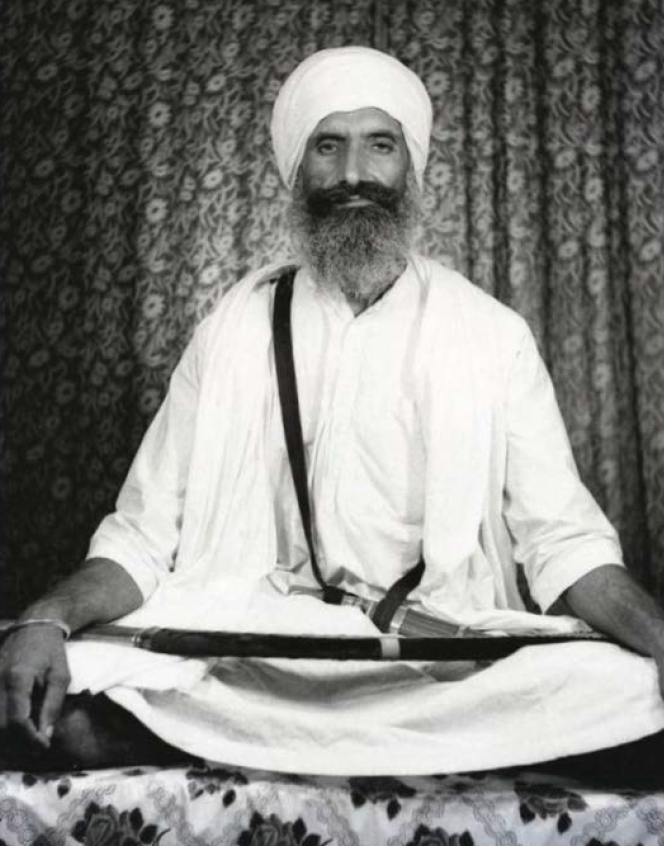
Sant Mohan Singh, who was the head of the Gurudwara Akhand Prakash till his death in 2020
