= Harnam Singh Khalsa =

Punjabi Sikh preacher

Sant Giani Harnam Singh Khalsa
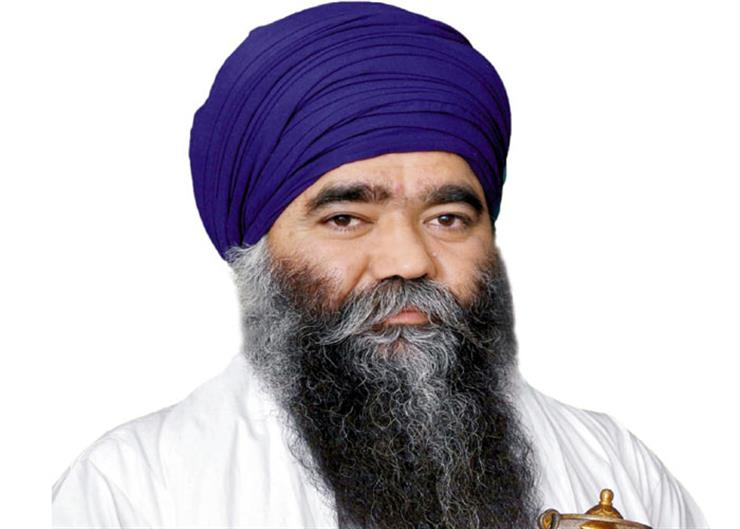

16th Jathedar of Damdami Taksal
- Incumbent
- Assumed office 27 December 2004
- Preceded by: Thakur Singh Bhindranwale

Personal details
- Born: Harnam Singh; 23 May 1968 (age 58)
- Known for: Acting Jathedar of Damdami Taksal; Head of Sant Samaj

Harnam Singh Khalsa, or Harnam Singh Dhumma, is the current and 16th Jathedar of Damdami Taksal, succeeding Thakur Singh Bhindranwale.

== Early life ==
In 1993, Harnam Singh went to America and moved to the city of Manteca, California, where he resided for 11 years. It is believed that he spent these years in the US meditating in the house of Sikhs which belonged to the Taksal, and that he gained dual citizenship of the United States.

== Jathedari ==
During the same time as the Dastarbandi ceremony of Harnam Singh, another prominent figure within the Damdami Taksal, known as Ram Singh Sangrawan, claimed to have been the successor, with his faction holding a separate ceremony. Thakur Singh Bhindranwale is said to have ostracized Ram Singh on video tape and had issued written statements condemning his actions prior to his death. In 2017, Harnam Singh became the successor to Jarnail Singh Bhindranwale after officially being declared the 16th Jathedar of Damdami Taksal by the SGPC.

== Controversy ==
In 2016, another prominent Sikh preacher, Ranjit Singh Dhadrian Wala, who was seen as an opponent to Harnam Singh, was attacked alongside his Jatha in his vehicle while travelling near Barewal village. Despite suffering several injuries, Ranjit Singh survived, while Bhupinder Singh, a member of his Jatha, lost his life. It is claimed that his Jatha was attacked while they had stopped at a 'Chabeel' stand.

Harnam Singh and Ranjit Singh Dhadrian Wala had been at the heart of a philosophical conflict for a long period of time, as they had profound disagreements on various matters regarding Sikh faith, such as controversy on the Dasam Granth. After this attack had been carried out, most people of Punjab, India had suspected Damdami Taksal under the leadership of Harnam Singh to have had a hand in the event. Within a few days, Harnam Singh had openly spoken about this attack and stated that some students of the Taksal had taken part of what had occurred, but that he was unaware and had condemned the atrocity.

=== Politics ===
Harnam Singh would often remain in controversy over his firm support to the Parkash Singh Badal-led Shiromani Akali Dal government from 2007-2017. This move was opposed by many Sikhs who viewed the Badal government as anti-Sikh for its failures in cases such as 2015 Guru Granth Sahib desecration controversy.

In 2024, Harnam Singh extended his support to the BJP-led Mahayuti alliance ahead of 2024 Maharashtra Legislative Assembly election on behalf of Sikh organizations in Maharashtra. He claimed this as a method to get Sikh issues addressed in that region. He faced backlash from multiple Sikh organizations that viewed Harnam Singh's decision as against Sikh interests.
