= Akali Prahlad Singh =

Nihang Sikh (d. 1865)

Jathedar Akali Prahlad Singh
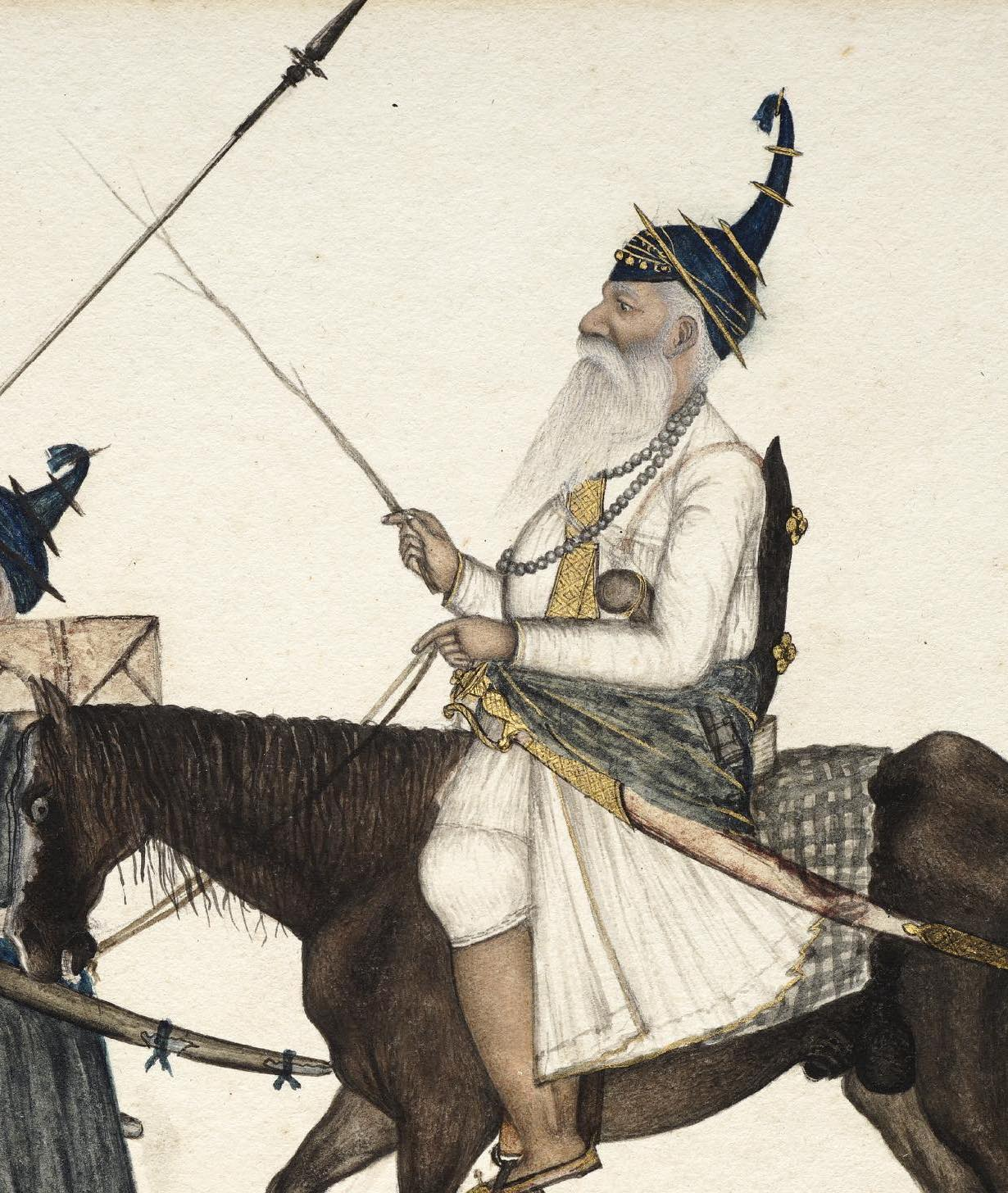
- Detail of possibly Jathedar Akali Prahlad Singh from a painting depicting a band (jatha) of Akali-Nihang warriors on the march, Company School, ca.1860

Jathedar of the Akal Takht
- In office 1846–1865
- Preceded by: Hanuman Singh
- Succeeded by: Gian Singh Deol

8th Jathedar of Buddha Dal
- In office 1846–1865
- Preceded by: Hanuman Singh
- Succeeded by: Gian Singh Deol

Personal details
- Born: Prahlad Singh
- Died: 1865 Hazur Sahib Nanded, British India
- Parents: Jagat Singh (father); Bishan Kaur (mother)

Akali Prahlad Singh (died 1865) was a Nihang Sikh and 8th Jathedar of Shiromani Panth Akali Budha Dal.

== Life ==
He became Jathedar of Budha Dal in 1846 and also became Jathedar of Akal Takht on the same day. He fought in the first and second Anglo-Sikh Wars against the British and raided cantonments outside of the area in 1850 alongside Bhai Maharaj Singh.

He was revered by Sikhs, Hindus, and Muslims alike.

When the Nihang Singhs moved out of Punjab after fighting with Patiala State Ruler and the British, they started moving towards Nanded. Ala Singh who was under the Patiala State after a series of battles was a Hazur Sahib Pujari (priest) and attacked Prahlad Singh with a battalion of the Royal Maharaja's Patiala State Armed Forces. Prahlad Singh suffered a mortal wound from a blade into his abdomen but quickly covered it and managed to slaughter his attacker. Prahlad Singh attained martyrdom while fighting with Major Ala Singh of Hazoor Sahib and Ala Singh was also killed in the same battle, although the Nihangs won in the end.
