= Akali Hanuman Singh =

Indian Sikh leader (1755–1846)

Shaheed Baba Hanuman Singh
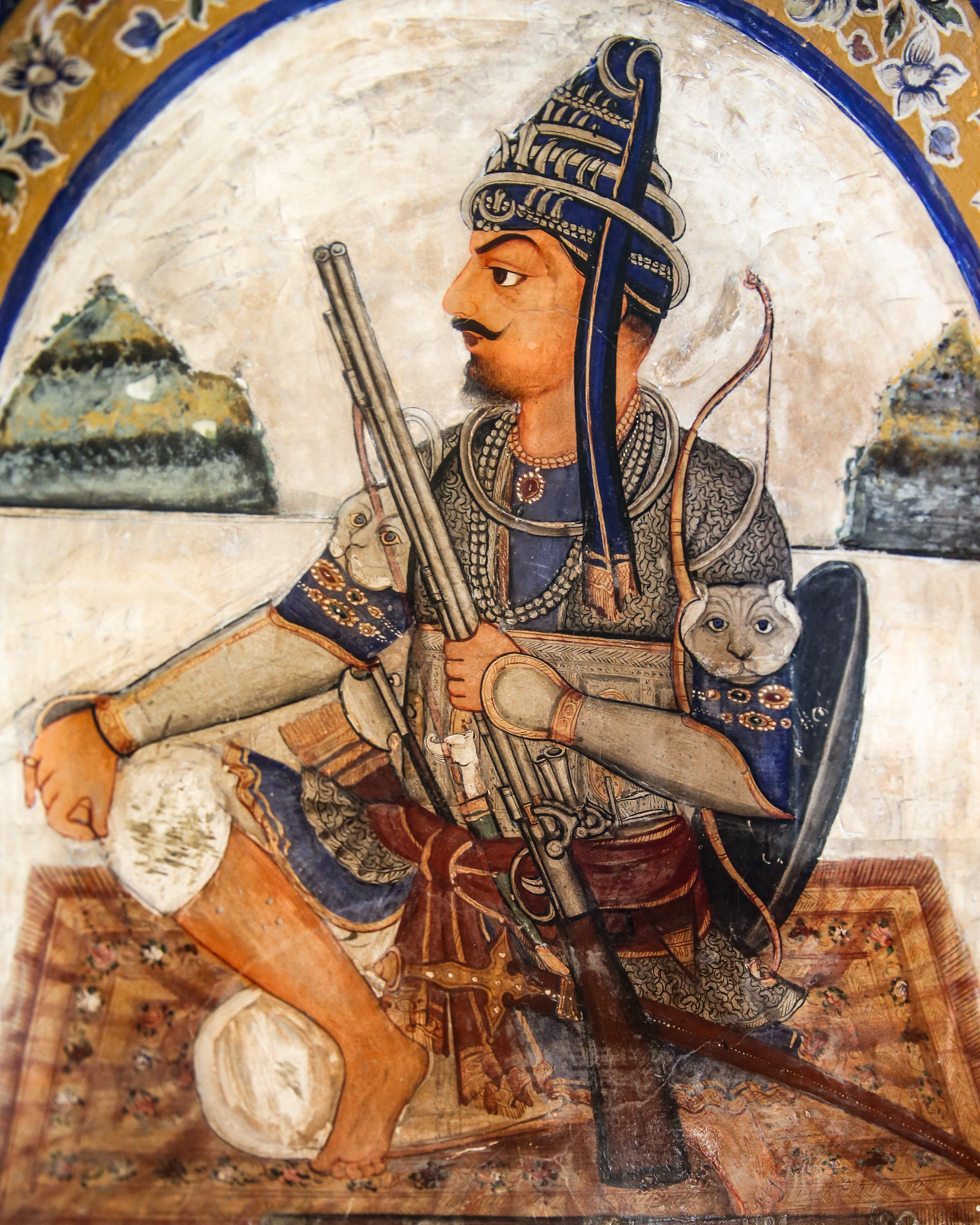
- Mural of Hanuman Singh from Gurdwara Baba Atal Rai in Amritsar, circa 19th century

Jathedar of the Akal Takht
- In office 1823–1846
- Preceded by: Phula Singh
- Succeeded by: Prahlad Singh

7th Jathedar of Buddha Dal
- In office 1823–1846
- Preceded by: Phula Singh
- Succeeded by: Prahlad Singh

Personal details
- Born: Hanuman Singh; November 1755 Naurang Singh Wala, Firozpur, Punjab
- Died: January 1846 (aged 90) Sohana, Mohali, Punjab
- Parents: Garja Singh (father); Harnam Kaur (mother)

Baba Hanuman Singh (November 1755 – January 1846), also known as Akali Hanuman Singh or Amar Shaheed Baba Hanuman Singh, was a Nihang Sikh and was the 7th Jathedar of Budha Dal and Jathedar of Akal Takhat. He was the successor of Akali Phula Singh. He was the first one among Nihang Sikhs who fought against the British. He attained martyrdom during a battle with the British and Patiala State in 1846.

== Biography ==
In November 1755, he was born to Garja Singh and Harnam Kaur in the village of Naurang Singh Wala in Zira, Ferozpur. At the age of 68, he was appointed as the Jathedar of the Akal Takht, the highest temporal seat of authority in Sikhism.

After defeat of the Sikh Empire against the British, Jathedar decided to re-group the Nihang Sikh army against the British at the Patiala Chauni. Raja Karam Singh, the ruler of Patiala, along with other Malwa princely states, maintained an alliance with the British East India Company. There were strict orders to shoot Nihangs on sight.

After the battle of Sabraon, the survivors of the Budha Dal sought out respite amongst the cis-Sutlej states south of the Sutlej river. Hanuman Singh received an invitation from the ruler of Patiala State, Narinder Singh. When Jathedar Hanuman Singh arrived at Patiala, Raja Karam Singh ordered a cannon assault on the Nihang forces, resulting in the deaths of a significant number of Nihang Singhs. Rest were forced to move to the forests nearby. Hanuman Singh and around 500 Nihang warriors survived this attack, and continued armed resistance against sustained British-supported artillery fire, using swords, bows and arrows, axes, and matchlock firearms.

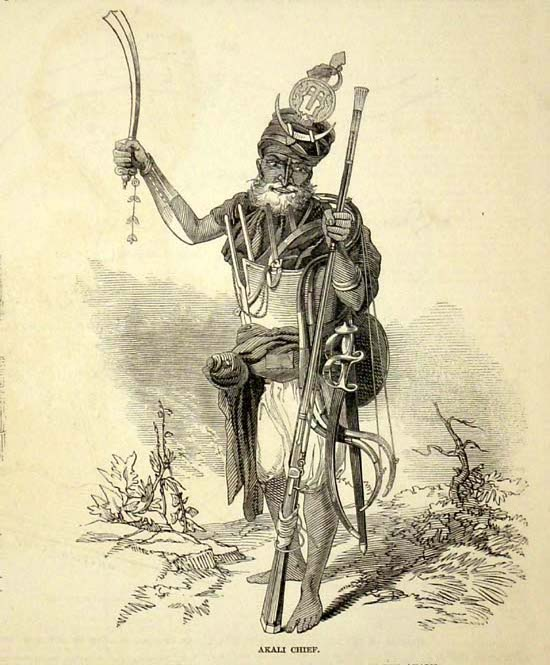
Wooden Engraving of 'Akali Chief' (likely Akali Hanuman Singh), by G.T. Vigne, ca.1846

Baba Hanuman Singh was wounded badly and died at the battle of Sohana, Mohali at the age of 90. He was succeeded in his position by Jathedar Baba Parladh Singh Nihang Singh, who continued the leadership and upheld the associated traditions and responsibilities.

His memorial, Gurdwara Singh Shaheedan, is situated in Sohana. In recognition of his life and contributions, a memorial known as Gurdwara Singh Shaheedan has been established in the village of Sohana. This site serves not only as a place of religious importance but also as a center for commemorating his legacy. To honor his memory and inspire younger generations, a Kabaddi academy has been established in Sohana bearing his name.
