= Thakur Singh Bhindranwale =

Punjabi Sikh preacher

Sant Giani Thakur Singh Bhindranwale

Acting Jathedar of Damdami Taksal
- In office 6 June 1984 – 24 December 2004
- Preceded by: Jarnail Singh Bhindranwale
- Succeeded by: Harnam Singh Khalsa

Personal details
- Born: Thakur Singh; 1915 Eechogill, Lahore, Punjab Province, British India (present-day Punjab, Pakistan)
- Died: 24 December 2004 (aged 89) Amritsar, Punjab, India
- Known for: Acting Jathedar of Damdami Taksal

Thakur Singh Bhindranwale (1915-2004), or Baba Thakur Singh, was the Acting Jathedar of Damdami Taksal, succeeding Jarnail Singh Bhindranwale.

== Early life ==
Thakur Singh was born in 1915 in the village of Eechogill, of Lahore district, to an agricultural family that was Amritdhari. After the 1947 Partition, him and his family resettled in a village of the Firozpur district in East Punjab.

== Religious career ==
Thakur Singh enrolled into the Damdami Taksal seminary during the tenure of Giani Gurbachan Singh Bhindranwale. After remaining a close associate of Bhindranwale for 22 years, Thakur Singh continued service within the Taksal with the new Jathedar, Giani Kartar Singh Bhindranwale, playing a major role in the organization's management during its participation in protests against the Emergency. He performed the tradition of Dastarbandi for Jarnail Singh Bhindranwale, after the passing of Kartar Singh.

=== Jathedari ===
After Jarnail Singh Bhindranwale got killed in Operation Bluestar at the Akal Takht, Thakur Singh took over the management of Damdami Taksal as the Acting, or Karajkari Jathedar, thus attaining the title of Bhindranwale. This included the maintenance of Gurdwaras under Taksal management, preaching Sikhi, and continuing the teaching of Santhiya. Thakur Singh famously stated that Jarnail Singh Bhindranwale was still alive and continued leading the Taksal, although it is not clear whether this statement was literal.

Thakur Singh was a significant organizer of the 1986 Sarbat Khalsa, presiding over the passing of multiple resolutions, and particularly being a leading figure for directing the reconstruction of Akal Takht.

Some leaders of the RSS and BJP claimed to have met Thakur Singh Bhindranwale at the Damdami Taksal headquarters in Mehta Chowk, Amritsar, in 2001, in order to recognize the travesties of Operation Bluestar and 1984 Sikh massacres, with the goal of ending the "bitterness" between the Sikh and Hindu communities of Punjab.

=== Death ===
Bhindranwale passed away at a hospital in Amritsar on 24 December, 2004. Due to a lack of clarity surrounding who would succeed him, a dispute was formed between Harnam Singh Khalsa and Ram Singh Sangrawan over who would lead the Damdami Taksal. However, Harnam Singh Khalsa ended up getting recognized as the official successor in 2017.
