= Akali Surjit Singh =

Jathedar of Budha Dal

Panth Patshah Akali Surjit Singh
- ਅਕਾਲੀ ਸੁਰਜੀਤ ਸਿੰਘ

14th Jathedar of Buddha Dal (Disputed)
- In office 2005–2014
- Preceded by: Akali Santa Singh
- Succeeded by: Akali Prem Singh (Disputed), Akali Joginder Singh, Baba Balbir Singh (Disputed)

Personal details
- Born: Surjit Singh; June 1945 Murar, Amritsar, Punjab
- Died: 2014 (age 69) Patiala, Punjab
- Known for: Fourteenth Jathedar of Budha Dal (Disputed)

Surjit Singh (1945–2014) or Jathedar Surjeet Singh Akali was a Nihang and the 14th Jathedar of Budha Dal, after Akali Santa Singh. He was born on June 7, 1945, in Murar, Amritsar.

== Early life ==
Before initiating to become a Singh of the Budha Dal, Baba Surjit Singh had done service with Punjab Police forces. He also served years in the Indian armed forces where they saw intense fighting, He was renowned to be a skilled marksmen who had killed many enemies in battle. After finishing their service, he was initiated into the Dal in 1972 through the Khalsa ceremony of Amrit Sanchar. Baba Surjit Singh stayed and did seva with the dal for nearly four decades, heading the Chakarvati Dal at some points during their time.

== Jathedari Controversy ==
In 2005, Akali Santa Singh with their worsening health is said to have declared Baba Surjeet Singh as the next head of the Budha Dal. This is disputed as Baba Balbir Singh, a contender as the 14th Jathedar of Budha Dal, is said to have been given the leadership of Budha Dal.

Subsequently, during the time, Baba Surjit Singh arrested for a short period until their release in response to protests by Nihangs. He was allegedly the main perpetrator in the Patiala Bagichi Nihang Kaand, which claimed the lives of the family members of Baba Balbir Singh. This dispute has led to the many divisions in Budha Dal today with different factions claiming their own Jathedars.

== Time in jail ==
After the death of Akali Santa Singh in 2008, the Dastarbandi ceremonies were conducted for both Baba Surjeet Singh and Baba Balbir Singh by different factions of the Nihangs. In the following year, Baba Surjeet Singh along with 22 other Singhs were sentenced jail in their involvement in the Patiala Bagichi Nihang Kaand. Baba Surjeet Singh is said to have organized religious ceremonies during his time in jail.

On September 3, 2014, Baba Surjeet Singh died at the age of 69 and his funeral was held at Gurdwara Lakhi Jungle near Bathinda. Baba Surjeet Singh had chosen Akali Joginder Singh as the acting Jathedar during his time in jail. However, despite having been given temporary authority, this caused some controversy as later on. Baba Prem Singh, at the time the caretaker of a Gurdwara in Nanded, was given the leadership of Budha Dal at Baba Surjit Singhs funeral. This decision further led the Dal into 3 factions.
