= Raqba =

- Village
- Location in Punjab, India Raqba (India)
- Coordinates: 30.8134485°N 75.6434226°E
- Country: India
- State: Punjab
- District: Ludhiana
- Tehsil: Ludhiana West

Government
  - Type: Panchayati raj (India)
  - Body: Gram panchayat

Languages
  - Official: Punjabi
  - Other spoken: Hindi
- Time zone: UTC+5:30 (IST)
- Telephone code: 0161
- ISO 3166 code: IN-PB
- Vehicle registration: PB-10
- Website: ludhiana.nic.in

Raqba is an Indian village located in the Ludhiana West tehsil, of Ludhiana district, Punjab.

== Administration ==
The village is administered by a Sarpanch who is an elected representative of the village as per the constitution of India and Panchayati raj (India).

Particulars	Total	Male	Female
Total No. of Houses	587		
Population	3,052	1,626	1,426

== Air travel connectivity ==
The closest airport to the village is Sahnewal Airport. Coming Soon.. Halwara Airport.

== Notable people ==
•Akali Joginder Singh, current Jathedar of Shiromani Panth Akali Budha Dal
