= Akali Joginder Singh =

- ਅਕਾਲੀ ਜੋਗਿੰਦਰ ਸਿੰਘ

Personal details
- Born: Joginder Singh Boparai Kalan, Ludhiana, Punjab
- Known for: Popular in Nihang circles, jathedar claimant

Joginder Singh, or Baba Joginder Singh is a popular Akali-Nihang and is a popular figure amongst the Nihang Dals. He was born in Boparai Kalan, Ludhiana.

== Personal life ==
Baba Joginder Singh was born in the Boparai Kalan village of the Ludhiana district. This region of western Ludhiana has been heavily influenced by Sikhi since the times of the travels of Guru Hargobind Sahib and Guru Gobind Singh.

Nihang Dals, Damdami Taksal, and the Nanaksar Kaleran sect along with other groups have had a great impact in this area. The village of Raqba for instant had been visited by Guru Hargobind Sahib and the specific spot where they had rested had a Gurdwara build on top it. This Gurdwara since has been run Budha Dal to maintain the history.

Due to the rich history and the close proximity of the village and Gurdwara, Baba Joginder Singh would often stay at the gurdwara and do seva for hours while also learning Sikh scriptures. This would lead to the enrolling of Baba Joginder Singh into the Budha Dal.

Baba Ji studied with Damdami Taksal under the guidance of Sant Niranjan Singh 'Vaid Ji', a student of Sant Gurbachan Singh Bhindranwale at Gurdwara Sri Sachkhand Sahib, Boparai Kalan.

For most of their life, Baba Joginder Singh has been at Gurdwara Damdama Sahib (Raqba) handling the maintenance and doing seva for the sangat.

== Jathedari ==
When Akali Surjit Singh was imprisoned alongside 22 other Nihangs in 2009, Baba Joginder Singh was put in control as an acting Jathedar of the Budha Dal to handle the Budha Dal while Baba Surjit Singh was in jail. There is no document confirming that Surjit Singh had ever been made Jathedar, as Jathedar Santa Singh openly stated that Balbir Singh would be the next Jathedar.

In September 2014 when Akali Surjit Singh died at the age of 69, Baba Joginder Singh was one of the many prominent names of whom might be chosen as the successor. Baba Surjit Singh is said to have chosen for Baba Joginder Singh to be the next Jathedar after his death. However, Baba Joginder Singh was in the UK during that time. Baba Prem Singh was chosen to be Jathedar at Baba Surjit Singh’s funeral. However, this is disputed by some Nihang Singhs of the Budha Dal.

In 2007, Nihangs attacked Jathedar Balbir Singh's family and killed his father, two sons and nephew. Later, in 2015, it was agreed by Prem Singh, Joginder Singh and other Dals that Balbir Singh was Jathedar, they all tied a "Farla" on Balbir Singh for this purpose.
