= Santhiya =

Correct pronunciation of Sikh Scripture, or Gurbani

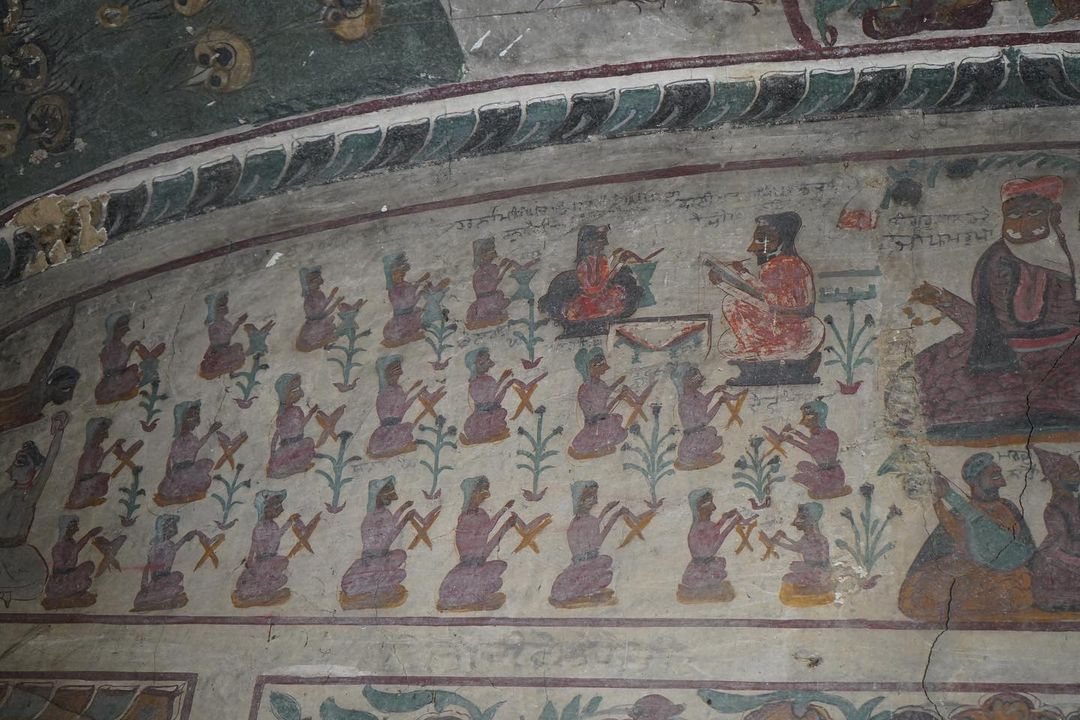
A fresco from a ‘Samadhi’ depicting ‘Santhiya’ being taught

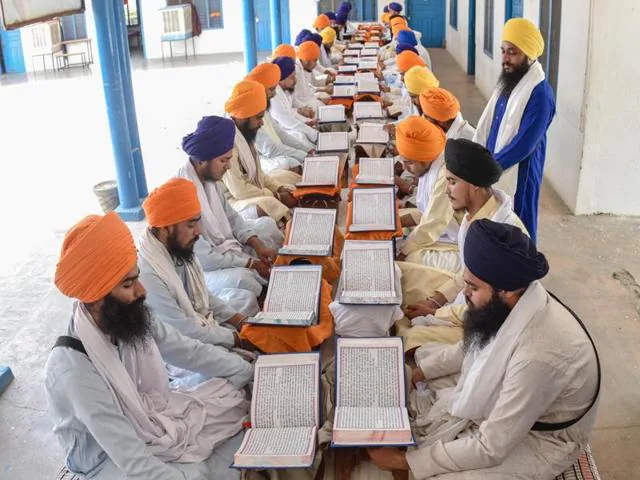
Students of the Sikh University, Damdami Taksal, learning Santhiya

Santhiya or Santhya (Gurmukhi: ਸੰਥਿਆ, romanized: Sathi'ā; 'elocution') is the correct pronunciation (ucharan) of Gurbani, taught in the manner of the 10th Sikh Guru, Guru Gobind Singh. It is comparable to the Islamic tajwid. Santhiya is almost always taught via a giani (also known as an Ustadh or Gurdev), who then teaches a vidyarthi (student). Educated vidyarthis can also teach other Sikhs santhiya. It involves the precise recitation and flow (rhythm) of the Gurbani (Sikh scripture) that is being recited. Color codes to stop and pause, known as vishraams, are commonly used to dictate the flow and rhythm of the recitation. Gurbani which is recited by a person who has taken santhiya is known as "shudh ucharan" (Gurmukhi: ਸੁਧ ਉਚਾਰਨ)

== History ==
According to a sakhi, Guru Hargobind once chastised a Sikh for becoming distracted whilst reciting gurbani. Guru Har Rai, the seventh Guru, emphasized the importance of not even changing a single word of gurbani and taught the correct pronunciation of it. In 1706, after the Battle of Muktsar, the army of Guru Gobind Singh camped at Sabo Ki Talwandi, now known as Takht Sri Damdamā Sahib. For nine months, Guru Gobind Singh, Baba Deep Singh, and Bhai Mani Singh scribed an entire volume of the Guru Granth Sahib in a volume known as the Damdama Bir. During this period, Guru Gobind Singh performed katha of the entirety of the scripture, as well as teaching the proper recitation, or santhiya. This exact bir (copy) was later given the gurgaddi as the 11th Guru of the Sikhs. That year, Guru Gobind Singh is said to have founded a distinguished school of exegesis, later headed up by Baba Deep Singh. Damdamā Sahib was considered to be the highest seat of learning for the Sikhs during the 18th century, and the Damdami Taksal claims direct historical ties to Guru Gobind Singh, who entrusted it with the responsibility of teaching the reading (santhyā), analysis (vichār) of the Sikh scriptures.

== Elocution ==
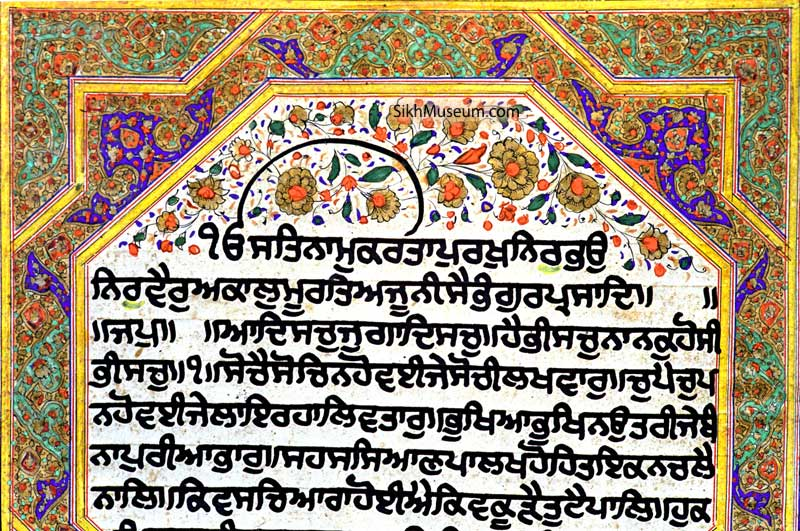
Example of a historical bir (copy) of the Guru Granth Sahib in larivaar

Santhiya is first taught via muharni, or simply the correct pronunciation of the Gurmuhki letters. The Gurmukhi script is used to write virtually all Sikh Scriptures and texts.

The Gurmukhi alphabhet has 35 original letters, as well as six supplementary consonants in official usage, referred to as the navīn ṭolī, navīn varag, or pair bindi meaning "new group," created by placing a dot (bindī) at the foot (pair) of the consonant to create pair bindī consonants. These are not present in the Guru Granth Sahib, but are present in the Dasam Granth and other Sikh Scriptures.

There are also 10 vowel matras, which are an integral part of the Gurmukhi Script.

In addition, there are three "subscript" letters, called dutt akkhar ("joint letters") or pairī̃ akkhar ("letters at the foot") that are utilised in modern Gurmukhī: forms of ਹ (ha), ਰ (ra), and ਵ (va).

Ex: ਤ੍ਵ ਸਰਬ ਨਾਮ ਕਥੈ ਕਵਨ ਕਰਮ ਨਾਮ ਬਰਣਤ ਸੁਮਤਿ

Correctly pronouncing all of these letters when doing the recitation of Gurbani is considered crucial, as failure to do so can be seen as "changing" the words, and sometimes even the meaning of Gurbani.

The Muharni is the traditional way of learning sounds by actually speaking them. It consists of the letters of Gurmukhi script in its natural order, with each letter followed by a word starting with that letter. It is recited as a rhyme.

== Larivaar and Pahd-Ched ==
The Mool Mantar of Sikhism with Vishraams and Color Marking. Letters are joined in "Larivaar"

Gurmukhi can be written in two ways: split (phad-ched) and the traditional way, known as larivaar. In larivaar Gurmukhi, there are no spaces between the letters in a sentence.

The Sikh Maha Mantar in larivaar (joined) Gurmukhi (Note: The "Maha Mantar" refers to the first half of the "Mul Mantar", up to Gurprasad(i))	ੴਸਤਿਨਾਮੁਕਰਤਾਪੁਰਖੁਨਿਰਭਉਨਿਰਵੈਰੁਅਕਾਲਮੂਰਤਿਅਜੂਨੀਸੈਭੰਗੁਰਪ੍ਰਸਾਦਿ॥
The Sikh Maha Mantar in phad-ched (split) Gurmukhi	ੴ ਸਤਿ ਨਾਮੁ ਕਰਤਾ ਪੁਰਖੁ ਨਿਰਭਉ ਨਿਰਵੈਰੁ ਅਕਾਲ ਮੂਰਤਿ ਅਜੂਨੀ ਸੈਭੰ ਗੁਰ ਪ੍ਰਸਾਦਿ॥

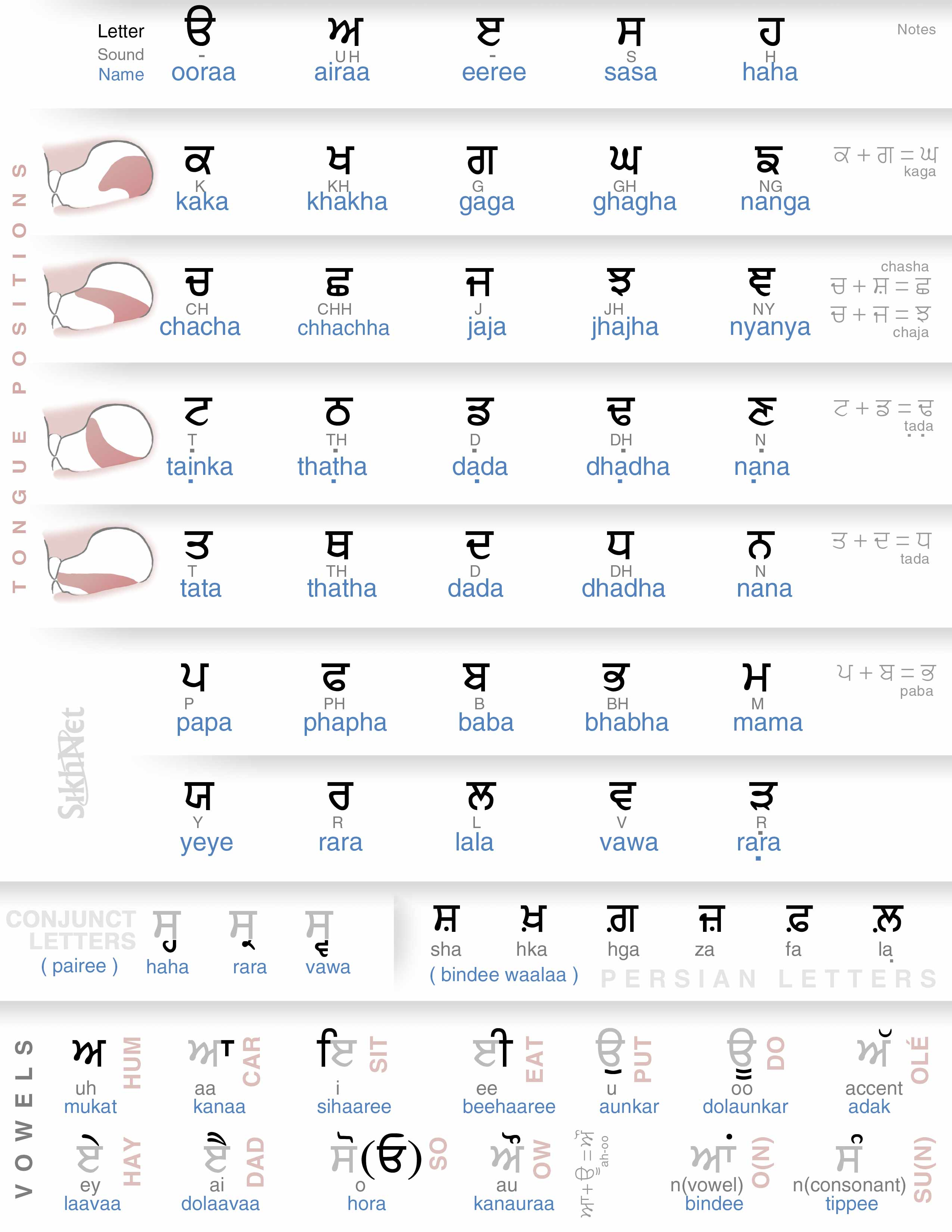
The Gurmukhi Alphabet with marks showing pronunciation (ucharan).

The Mūl Mantar, the opening verse of the Sikh scripture, with "Shudh Ucharan"

Before the printing of the Guru Granth Sahib was widespread, the copies or birs of the scripture were handwritten almost always in larivaar script. This made reading Gurbani significantly harder, thus providing greater necessity for santhiya. In order to mark pauses, vishraams are used. A vishraam literally means "pause", and they are frequently used in Gurbani to specific a specific metre (such as a Salok or Doh(i)ra, some of the most common poetic metres in Sikh Scriptures) and regulate the reciter's elocution. The green vishraams mark a short pause, magenta and red a medium pause, while the orange vishraams mark a long pause.

Punctuation can also be used to mark the vishraams, or pauses. A period "." marks the smallest pause, a comma "," marks a medium pause, and a semicolon ";" marks a long pause.

Ex: ਜਲ ਤੇ ਉਪਜ ਤਰੰਗ ਜਿਉਂ ; ਜਲ ਹੀ ਬਿਖੈ ਸਮਾਹਿ॥੬੦॥

Transliteration: jal thae oupaj tharang jio ---- jal hee bikhai samahi ||60||
