= Jathedar =

Sikh title

A jathedar (Punjabi: ਜੱਥੇਦਾਰ) is a leader of high regard chosen to head and ensure discipline within a jatha, a troop of Sikhs. In modern-times, the term is used to in-reference to leaders of Sikh spiritual organisations, such as any of the Panj Takhts.

== History ==
During the early-to-mid 18th century, the term was used to refer to a leader of a Jatha. However, it began to be replaced by titles, such as Sardar, due to Afghan influence from the mid-18th century onwards. The terms "jatha" and "jathedar" were revived during the Singh Sabha Movement to refer to "bands of preachers and choirs", an association which survives until the present-day. However, during the later Gurdwara Reform Movement, the terms began to take on a martial tone once again, resuscitating and harking back to the 18th century's context for the word.

== Jathedars of the Akal Takht ==
1. Gurdas Bhalla (c. 1606–c. 1637)
  Usurped by Minas from 1640 to 1698
2. Mani Singh (c. 1699–c. 1737) (executed)
3. Darbara Singh (c. 1722–1734)
4. Kapur Singh Virk (1733–1748)
5. Jassa Singh Ahluwalia (1748–1783)
6. Phula Singh (c. 1800–1823) †
7. Hanuman Singh (1823–1846) †
8. Prahlad Singh (1846–1865) †
  Usurped by Sarbarahs appointed by the British Indian Government from 1859 to 1920
9. Teja Singh Bhuchar (1920–1921) X
10. Teja Singh Akarpuri (1921–1923) & (1926–1930)
11. Udham Singh Nagoke (1923–1924) & (1926-short period)
12. Acchar Singh (1924–1926) & (1955–1962)
13. Didar Singh (1925-short period)
14. Jawaher Singh Mattu Bhaike (1926-short period)
15. Gurmukh Singh Musafir (1931–1934)
16. Wasakha Singh Dadehar (1934)
17. Mohan Singh Nagoke (1935–1952)
18. Partap Singh (1938–1948) (1952–1954) X
19. Mohan Singh Tur (1962–1963)
20. Sadhu Singh Bhaura (1964–1980)
21. Kirpal Singh (1963–1965) (1983–1986)
22. Gurdial Singh Ajnoha (1980–1982)
23. Jasbir Singh Rode (1986–1989)
24. Gurdev Singh Kaunke (1986–1993) (executed)
25. Gurbachan Singh Manochahal (1986–1987) †
26. Darshan Singh (1986–1988) (1986–1988) (1989–1990)
27. Manjit Singh (1994–1997)
28. Ranjit Singh (1994–1999)
29. Puran Singh (1999–2000)
30. Joginder Singh Vedanti (2000–2008)
31. Gurbachan Singh (2008–2018)
32. Jagtar Singh Hawara (2015–Incumbent)
33. Dhian Singh Mand (2015–Incumbent)
34. Harpreet Singh (2018–2023)
35. Raghbir Singh (2023–2025)
36. Kuldeep Singh Gargaj (2025–Incumbent)

== Jathedars of Takht Kesgarh Sahib ==
- Karam Singh
- Kharak Singh
- Budh Singh
- Puran Singh
- Puran Singh
- Resham Singh
- Partap Singh
- Bir Singh
- Ajit Singh
- Fauja Singh
- Bachitar Singh
- Guridal Singh
- Harcharan Singh
- Shavinder Singh
- Labh Singh †
- Balbir Singh
- Manjit Singh
- Tarlochan Singh
- Mal Singh (2013-2017)
- Amrik Singh Ajnala (2015–2017)
- Raghbir Singh (2017–2023)
- Sultan Singh (2023-2025)
- Kuldeep Singh Gargaj (2025–Incumbent)

== Jathedars of Takht Damdama Sahib ==
- Deep Singh †
- Sudh Singh
- Karam Singh
- Natha Singh †
- Ran Singh
- Bhagwaan Singh
- Baghel Singh
- Diwan Singh
- Ram Singh
- Harchand Singh Longowal X
- Jagir Singh
- Avtar Singh Brahma †
- Sabh Lakha Singh †
- Jaswant Singh
- Sanjh Hakam Singh
- Mehar Singh
- Kewal Singh
- Balwant Singh Nandgarh
- Gurmukh Singh
- Baljit Singh Daduwal (2015–2020)
- Harpreet Singh (2018–2025)
- Jagtar Singh (2025-short period)
- Tek Singh Dhanaula (2025–Incumbent)

== Jathedars of Takht Patna Sahib ==
- Maan Singh (–2000)
- Iqbal Singh (2000–2019)
- Ranjit Singh (2019–2022)
- Baldev Singh (2022–Incumbent)

== Jathedars of Takht Hazur Sahib ==
- Santokh Singh (1709–1715)
- Khushal Singh (1715–1722)
- Lal Singh (1722–1730)
- Bakhtawar Singh (1730–1736)
- Charat Singh (1736–1786)
- Mohar Singh (1786–1793)
- Ram Singh (1793–1804)
- Dharam Singh (1804–1812)
- Charat Singh (1812–1817)
- Sahib Singh (1817–1818)
- Aaya Singh (1818–1824)
- Jassa Singh (1824–1839)
- Isher Singh (1839–1841)
- Waryam Singh (1841–1844)
- Tara Singh (1844–1858)
- Atar Singh (1858–1867)
- Prem Singh (1867–1875)
- Deva Singh (1875–1876)
- Brij Singh (1876–1877)
- Jawahar Singh (1877–1883)
- Nanu Singh (1883–1890)
- Maan Singh (1890–1913)
- Daya Singh (1913–1914)
- Hari Singh (1914–1919)
- Hira Singh (1919–1945)
- Bahadur Singh (1945–1946)
- Hira Singh (1946–1950)
- Harnam Singh (1950–1956)
- Joginder Singh (1956–1984)
- Hajura Singh (1984–2000)
- Kulwant Singh (2000–Incumbent)

== Jathedars of Damdami Taksal ==
- Baba Deep Singh Ji † (1708-1757)
- Baba Gurbaksh Singh (1688-1764)
- Soorat Singh (1764-Unknown)
- Gurdas Singh
- Sant Singh (Unknown-1832)
- Daya Singh (1832-Unknown)
- Bhagwan Singh
- Harnam Singh Bedi
- Bishan Singh Muralewale (Unknown-1905)
- Sundar Singh Bhindranwale (1905-1930)
- Gurbachan Singh Bhindranwale (1930-1961)
- Kartar Singh Bhindranwale (1969–1977)
- Jarnail Singh Bhindranwale (1977–1984)
- Thakur Singh Bhindranwale (1984–2004)
- Harnam Singh (2004–Incumbent)

== Jathedars of Budha Dal ==
- Binod Singh (1708–1716) †
- Darbara Singh (1716–1734) †
- Nawab Kapur Singh (1737–1753)
- Jassa Singh Ahluwalia (1753–1783)
- Akali Naina Singh (1783–1800)
- Akali Phula Singh (1800–1823) †
- Akali Hanuman Singh (1823–1846) †
- Akali Prahlad Singh (1846–1865) †
- Akali Gian Singh (1865–1907)
- Akali Teja Singh (1907–1929)
- Akali Sahib Singh Kaladhari (1929–1942)
- Akali Karam Singh (1942–1944)
- Akali Chet Singh (1944–1969)
- Akali Santa Singh (1969-2007)
- Akali Surjit Singh (2007–2014)
- Akali Joginder Singh Raqbewale (2014–2023)
- Akali Prem Singh disputed (2014-2017)
- Akali Mann Singh disputed (2017–Incumbent)
- Akali Baba Balbir Singh ( current mukhi of Buddha dal)

== Jathedars of Tarna Dal ==
- Baba Deep Singh †
- Baba Gurbakhsh Singh (1688-1764) {{KIA}}
- Sudha Singh
- Karam Singh
- Natha Singh
- Ram Singh Bedi
- Jassa Singh
- Nand Singh
- Ram Singh
- Gurmukh Singh
- Sadhu Singh
- Bishan Singh
- Kirtan Singh (1994-2001)
- Makhan Singh (2001-2016)
- Gajjan Singh (2016-2023)
- Joga Singh (2023-current)

== Jathedars of Bidhi Chand Dal ==
- Bidhi Chand Chhina
- Lal Chand
- Gurdial Chand
- Hukam Chand
- Jeoun Singh
- Jaspat Singh
- Bhag Singh
- Labh Singh
- Natha Singh
- Sohan Singh
- Daya Singh Sur Singh (1975-2014)
- Avtar Singh Sur Singh (2014-Incumbent)
