= Damdami Taksal =

Sikh cultural and educational organization

Damdami Taksal Jatha Bhindran-Mehta
- ਦਮਦਮੀ ਟਕਸਾਲ
- ।। ਘੜੀਐ ਸਬਦੁ ਸਚੀ ਟਕਸਾਲ ।। ghaṛīai shabadu saccī ṭakasāla "The Shabda is forged in the Mint of Truth"
- Formation: 7 August 1706
- Founder: Guru Gobind Singh
- Purpose: Sikh seminary
- Headquarters: Gurdwara Gurdarshan Parkash
- Coordinates: 31°40′01″N 75°14′52″E
- Jathedar: Harnam Singh Khalsa
- Website: https://www.damdamitaksal.com/

The Damdamī Ṭaksāl, Jatha Bhindra(n), or Sampardai Bhindra(n) is an orthodox Khalsa Sikh cultural and educational organization, based in India. They are known for their teachings of vidya as well as gurbani santhiya. Its headquarters are located in the town of Mehta Chowk, approximately 40 km north of the city of Amritsar. It has been described as a seminary or “moving university” of the Sikh countryside.

The Damdami Taksal borrows many foundational aspects from the Giani Samparda (headed by the Giani family), the Girivari Samparda, the Damdami Samparda, the Namdhari Samparda and the Dera Naurangabad.

== History ==
In 1706, after the Battle of Muktsar, the Khalsa Army of Guru Gobind Singh camped at Sabo Ki Talwandi. This acted as a damdamā, or halting place (lit. "breathing place"), and is now the site of Takht Sri Damdamā Sahib. That year, Guru Gobind Singh is said to have founded a distinguished school of exegesis, later headed up by Baba Deep Singh. Damdamā Sahib was considered to be the highest seat of learning for the Sikhs during the 18th century, and Damdami Taksal claims direct historical ties to Guru Gobind Singh, who entrusted it with the responsibility of teaching the reading (santhiya), analysis (vichār) and recitation of the Sikh scriptures, and Baba Deep Singh. The word ṭaksāl (lit. 'mint') refers to an education institute; which is a community of students who associate themselves with a particular sant (lit. spiritual leader or saint).

The main center of the present-day Damdami Taksal (Jatha Bhindran-Mehta) is located at Gurdwārā Gurdarshan Parkāsh in Mehta, Amritsar. It is actually a branch of a major school of traditional Sikh learning known as the Bhindrāṅ Ṭaksāl which is based Mehta. Although, this Taksal was established in 1906 by Sundar Singh (1883–1930) of Boparai Kalan in Ludhiana. It achieved prominence through its second incumbent, Gurbachan Singh Khalsa (1902–1969) of Bhindran Kalan, hence its name. He devoted his entire life to teaching the enunciation and intonation in reciting the Sikh scriptures. He trained a large number of gianīs, traditional Sikh scholars, through his mobile seminary. When he died in 1969 he was succeeded by two contenders, Giani Mohan Singh (1919–2020), leading the original Bhindrāṅ Kalāṅ branch in Ludhiana and Kartar Singh Khalsa (1932–1977), leading the Mehtā branch in Amritsar district.

During much of the mid-1900s, Gurbachan Singh Khalsa was a prominent sant teaching a large number of students and remains an influential figure. The influence of Bhindran Taksal is attested by the fact that its alumni include the mukkh granthī (chief narrator) at the Golden Temple, jathedārs of various Sikh takhts, and granthīs (narrators) of major gurdwaras.

The Damdami Taksal also had a history of dispute with the Government of India, as a previous leader, Kartar Singh Khalsa, had been a severe critic of the excesses of Indira Gandhi's Emergency rule. In 1975, a large event to commemorate the 300th anniversary martyrdom of Guru Tegh Bahadur was attended by Indira Gandhi and Kartar Singh Khalsa. This was the starting point of tensions between Damdami Taksal and the Central Government under Congress. The dispute (Note: When Indira Gandhi came onto the stage in the presence of Guru Granth Sahib, while all those on the stage arose to welcome and respect her, but it was only Kartar Singh Bhindranwale remained seated. On the stage Kartar Singh spoke saying no one is more powerful than our Guru and we are not required to get up and pay respect to her, he was applauded by the people.) was about who was the leader and who had the greater authority over the Sikh people, the Guru Granth Sahib or Indira Gandhi.

The Damdami Taksal was first brought to wider attention in the whole of India by Jarnail Singh Bhindranwale during the 1978 Sikh–Nirankari clashes, the Anandpur Resolution, the Dharam Yudh Morcha of 1982, and later Operation Blue Star and the Khalistan movement and insurgency.

== Jathedars of Damdami Taksal ==
The following table lists the Jathedars of Damdami Taksal:

			Term		Description	
No.	Name (Birth–Death)	Image	Start	End		Citation(s)
1.	Baba Deep Singh (1682–1757)		1706	1757		
2.	Baba Gurbaksh Singh (1688-1761)		1757	1761		
3.	Bhai Soorat Singh		1761			
4.	Bhai Gurdas Singh (Note: This is not the same "Bhai Gurdas Singh" who wrote the 41st Vaar) (b. 1773)					
5.	Giani Sant Singh (1768–1832)			1832		
6.	Sant Giani Daya Singh		1832			
7.	Sant Giani Bhagwan Singh					
8.	Sant Giani Harnam Singh Bedi			1885		
9.	Sant Bishan Singh Muralewale (1852–1905)		1885	1907		
10.	Sant Sundar Singh Bhindranwale (1883–1930)		1907	1930		
11.	Sant Gurbachan Singh Bhindranwale (1902–1969)		1930	1969		
12.	Sant Kartar Singh Bhindranwale (1932–1977)		1969	1977		
13.	Sant Jarnail Singh Bhindranwale (1947–1984)		1977	1984		
14.	Baba Thakur Singh Bhindranwale (1915–2004); Acting		1984	2004		
15.	Sant Baba Harnam Singh (Born 1968)		2004	Present		

== Leadership ==
During British colonial rule, Sunder Singh Bhindranwala (Note: Sunder Singh was from the Bhindran village and thus was referred to as Bhindranwale, "the one from Bhindran") set about purging diversity in Sikh doctrine, ritual and practice, hoping to have a uniform Sikh community. Part of this strategy was to have a standardized Rehat Maryada (Code of Conduct) .

Sunder Singh was succeeded by Gurbachan Singh Khalsa in 1930, after whom Kartar Singh Bhindranwala continued his work in 1961. Kartar Singh established Gurdwara Gurdarshan Parkash at Mehta, Amritsar. In 1977, after the death of Kartar Singh, Jarnail Singh Bhindranwale became the Jathedar of Damdami Taksal.

Thakur Singh Bhindranwale took over his Taksal when Jarnail Singh Bhindranwale was killed in 1984 by the Parachute Regiment and Special Group in Harmander Sahib, referred to as Operation Bluestar. Baba Thakur Singh famously said that Jarnail Singh Bhindranwale was not dead, was the last jathedar, and was in "chardi kala", and was to return soon. It is unclear if he meant that Jarnail Singh Bhindranwale would come again via transmigration.

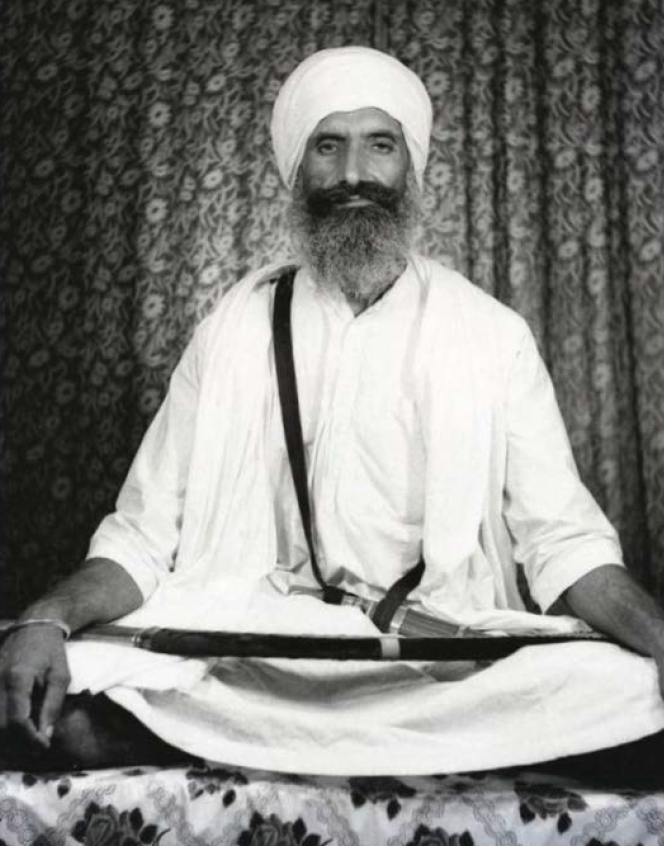
Mohan Singh and Kartar Singh would both contend for the jathedari (leadership) of the taksal

=== Succession disputes ===
After the death of Gurbachan Singh, there was a succession dispute between Giani Mohan Singh and Kartar Singh, the later of whom would later be accepted as the jathedar (leader). Furthermore, after the death of Thakur Singh Bhindranwale, the leadership of Taksal as was handed over to Giani Ram Singh Sangrawa by the SGPC in January 2005. Despite this, senior leadership and members of Taksal accepted Harnam Singh Khalsa as the successor. In July 2017, Taksal chief Harnam Singh Khalsa was hailed as the successor to Jarnail Singh Bhindranwale by the SGPC. Giani Ram Singh Sangrawa now heads a breakaway group as "mukh sevadar" (chief servicemember). Controversy exists over whether or not Baba Harnam Singh or Giani Ram Singh can claim "jathedari" (leadership status), or if the individuals are merely "mukh sevadar" (chief servicemembers) or "mukhi" (chiefs).

=== Gurdwaras managed by Damdami Taksal Jatha Bhindra (Mehta) ===
1. Gurdwara Gurdarshan Parkash, Mehta Chowk, Amritsar,

2. Gurdwara Baabe Shaheedan Patshahi 6vi, Sarmastpur, Jalandhar

3. Gurdwara Dera Baba Jawahar Daas Ji, Soos, Hoshiarpur

4. Gurdwara Shaheed Ganj, B-Block Railway Colony, Amritsar

5. Gurdwara Tap Asthan Baba Ram Thaman Ji, Manesh, Gurdaspur

6. Gurdwara Janam Asthan Baba Deep Singh Ji Shaheed, Pahuwind, Tarn Taran

7. Gurdwara Gurdarshan Parkash, Opposite Panj Pyare Park, Anandpur Sahib

8. Gurdwara Sant Khalsa, Rode, Moga

9. Gurdwara Kaliansar Sahib Patshahi 6vi, Ladhaike, Moga

10. Gurdwara Sri Guru Nanak Sangatsar Sahib, Mohre, Firozpur

11. Gurdwara Gurdarshan Parkash Patshahi 10vi Bhai Fattu Sammu Dia Tahlia, Jalalabad, Firozpur

12. Gurdwara Guru Nanak Parkash, Tracy, CA, USA

13. Gurdwara Guru Nanak Parkash, Fresno, CA, USA

14. Gurdwara Guru Nanak Parkash, Las Vegas, NV, USA

15. Gurdwara Guru Nanak Parkash, Bellingham, WA, USA

16. Gurdwara Guru Nanak Parkash, Langley, BC, CA

17. Gurdwara Amrit Parkash, Surrey, BC, CA

== Beliefs ==
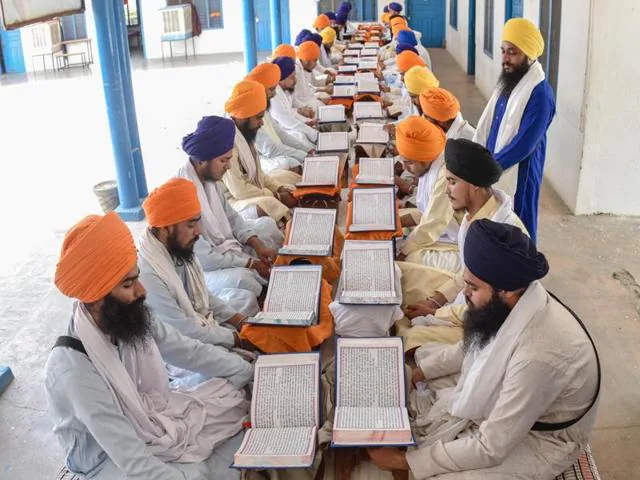
Students of the Sikh University, Damdami Taksal, learning Santhiya

The Damdami Taksal follow their own code of conduct called the Gurmat Rehat Maryada, which is different from the mainsteam Sikh Rehat Maryada followed by the Akal Takht and published by the Shiromani Gurdwara Prabandhak Committee. Some differences include the reading of Ragmala after Akhand Path and requiring its Amritdharis to be strict lacto-vegetarians. It is well known for prioritizing extreme discipline & strictness within the Sikh lifestyle.

=== Vegetarianism ===
The Damdami Taksal advocates a strict lacto-vegetarian diet. Eating meat is not allowed in any form including eggs, fish and gelatine.

Although mainstream Amritdhari Sikhs may freely eat any meat, eggs and fish that it is not Kuthha Maas (ritually slaughtered meat, ie: Halal or Kosher), those taking Amrit from the Damdami Taksal are required to be strict lacto-vegetarians and cannot eat meat, eggs or food which contain these products (such as animal fat or cakes with egg in it).

It should be noted, however, that this is not the case for Amritdharis following the official rules of the Akal Takht (which is followed in the Golden Temple and Kesgarh Sahib) or Nihang Sikhs. The Sikh Gurus also never restricted the consumption of meat, eggs or fish during any of their lifetimes, provided the meat was not Kuthha Maas.

== Relationship with other sects ==
Damdami Taksal is somewhat influenced by the Nirmala school of thought as the eleventh leader of Damdami Taksal, Bishan Singh Muralewale, studied under Nirmala Sants such as Pundit Tara Singh and Pundit Sadhu Singh during the late 19th century. Sant Gurbachan Singh Bhindranwale studied the famous Faridkot Teeka authored by Nirmala scholars.

== See also ==
- Khalsa
- Nirmala
- Sects of Sikhism
