= Jatha =

Sikh armed organization

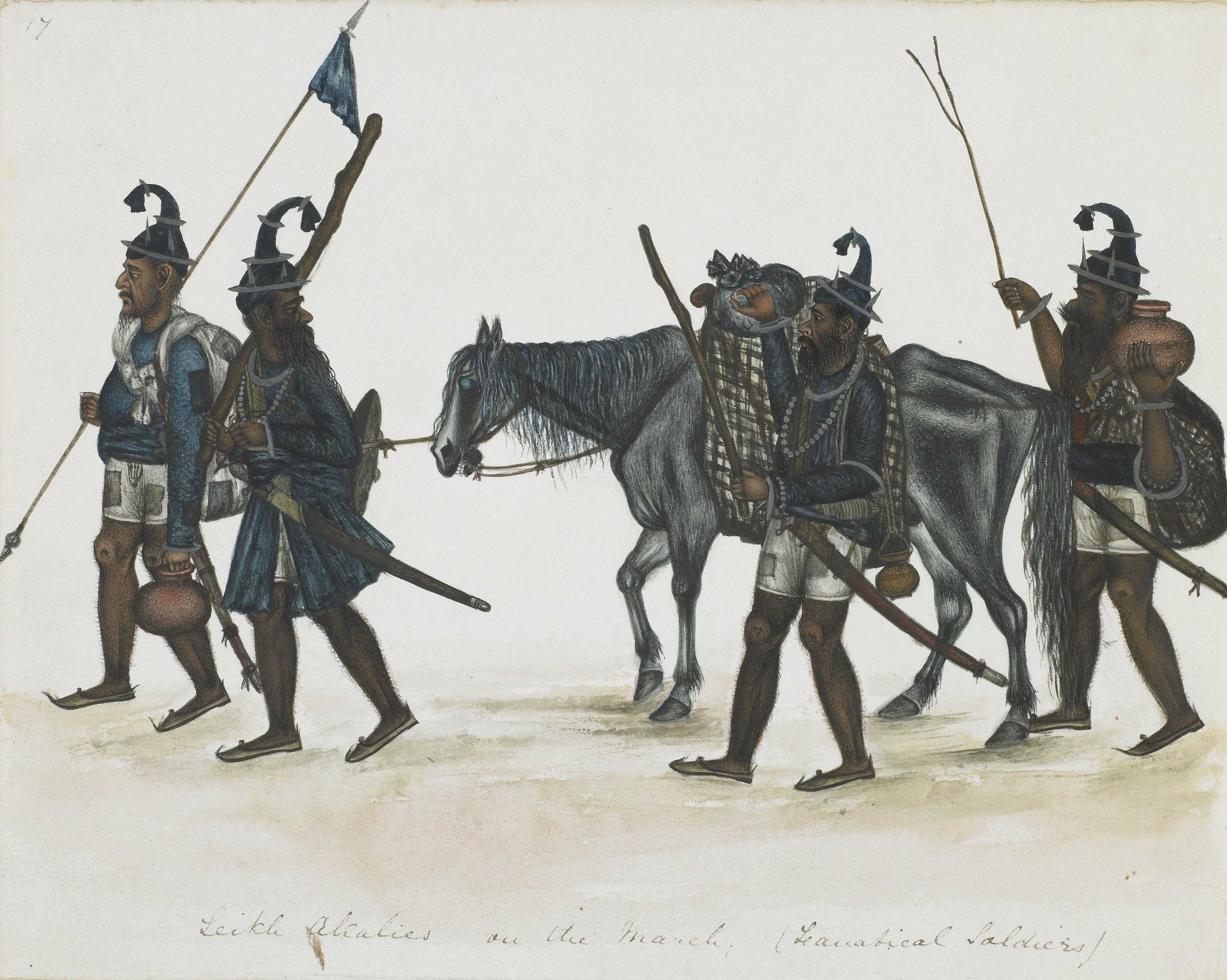
Painting of a small jatha (contingent or band) of Akali-Nihang Sikhs on the march, ca.1850

A Jatha (Punjabi: ਜੱਥਾ [sg]; ਜਥੇ [pl] (Gurmukhi)) is an armed body of Sikhs that has existed in Sikh tradition since 1699, the beginning of the Khalsa (Sikh martial order). Jatthā in the Punjabi language means "a group of people."

== Etymology ==
The word derives from the Sanskrit word yūtha, meaning a "herd, flock, multitude, troop, band, or host".

== Origins ==
=== Damdami Taksal Jatha ===
After the creation of the Khalsa, Guru Gobind Singh is said to have created the Damdami Taksal in 1706. Its first Jathedar (leader) was Baba Deep Singh who died at the age of 83 by having his head severed in a battle against Durrani forces.

=== Aftermath of the death of Banda Singh Bahadur ===
In the Sikh tradition, a Jatha refers to a group of Sikh volunteers working together for a common cause, whether that cause is violent or peaceful. The term was already in use by the first half of the 18th century amongst the Sikhs but its exact point of origin has not been traced as of yet. The aftermath of the execution of Banda Singh Bahadur and persecution of the Sikhs by the Mughal authorities led to the Sikhs gathering in armed nomadic groups, termed Jathas.

Each Jatha was headed by a local leader, known as a Jathedar. The Jathedar was chosen based on merit alone, as only the most daring and courageous warrior of a particular band was selected for the honour. Devout Sikhs of the Khalsa joined the various Jathas, which appealed to them to advance the cause of their religion and fight oppression. An important selection criterion for joining a Jatha was skill in horsemanship, as cavalry tactics and guerilla warfare was vital to the fighting style of the Jathas against the far more numerous Mughal and Afghan forces. Therefore, agility and maneuverability were the most critical skills that a Sikh had to master to succeed in a Jatha.

The Jathas were in ordinary times independent of one another and had to depend on itself to survive, but they co-operated on missions. All of the Jathas submitted to the authority of the Sarbat Khalsa and attended the annual Diwali convening in Amritsar. If a Gurmata was passed by the Sarbat Khalsa, the Jathas obeyed it.

=== Peace at Amritsar ===
The Mughal government made peace with the Sikhs for a short sliver of time between 1733 and 1735 and allowed the Jathas to reside in Amritsar without being harassed. During this period, Nawab Kapur Singh, leader of the Sikhs at that time, decided to organise the various Jathas into two groups ('Dals', referring to a "branch" or "section"): the Budha Dal (army of the old) and the Taruna Dal (army of the young). The Taruna Dal itself was further split into five sub-sections. Each sub-section of the Taruna Dal flew its own banner.

=== Government oppression resumes ===
However, state oppression of the Sikhs shortly after began again and the jathas started dividing themselves into more and more groups. Then on the annual Diwali convening of the Sarbat Khalsa in 1745, a Gurmata was passed that reorganised the Jathas into 25 groups. Yet the number of Jathas kept on ballooning until around 65 Jathas had begun to be known, as recorded by the contemporary Ali ud-Din Mufti in his Ibrat Namah.

List of the contemporary sixty-five jathas of the mid-18th century
No.	Leader	Affiliation	Associated habitation	Notes
1.	Nawab Kapur Singh Faizullapuria			
2.	Jassa Singh Ahluwalia		Kalal village	
3.	Hari Singh Dhillon	Bhangi	Panjwar village	
4.	Jhanda Singh	Bhangi		
5.	Ganda Singh	Bhangi	Panjwar village	
6.	Natha Singh	Bhangi		
7.	Gujjar Singh	Bhangi		
8.	Garja Singh			
9.	Nibahu Singh	Bhangi		Nibahu Singh was the brother of Gujjar Singh Bhangi.
10.	Lehna Singh Khallon	Bhangi		
11.	Mehtab Singh		Khakh village, Amritsar district	
12.	Charat Singh Kanahiya	Kanhaiya		
13.	Diwan Singh			
14.	Phula Singh		Panawala village	
15.	Sanwal Singh Randhawa	Bhangi	Wagha village	
16.	Gurbakhsh Singh	Bhangi	Doda village	This jatha later joined the Bhangis.
17.	Dharam Singh	Bhangi	Klalwala village	
18.	Tara Singh	Bhangi	Chainpuria village	
19.	Bagh Singh		Kot Syed Muhammad village	
20.	Haqiqat Singh Kanahiya	Kanhaiya		
21.	Mehtab Singh	Bhangi	Wadala Sandhuan village	
22.	Jai Singh		Kahna village	
23.	Jandu Singh		Kahna village	
24.	Tara Singh		Kahna village	
25.	Sobha Singh		Kahna village	
26.	Bhim Singh		Kahna village	
27.	Amar Singh		Wagha village	
28.	Sobha Singh		Bhika village	
29.	Baghel Singh		Jhabal village	
30.	Gulab Singh		Dallewal village	
31.	Hari Singh		Dallewal village	
32.	Naudh Singh	Sukerchakia		Led by the great-grandfather of Maharaja Ranjit Singh.
33.	Gulab Singh		Majitha village	
34.	Mehtab Singh		Julka village	
35.	Karora Singh		Pangarh village	
36.	Hara Singh			
37.	Lajja Singh			
38.	Nand Singh		Sanghna village	
39.	Kapur Singh	Bhangi	Surianwala village	
40.	Amar Singh	Bhangi	Kingra village	Later joined the Bhangis.
41.	Jiwan Singh	Bhangi	Qila Jiwan Singh village	
42.	Sahib Singh	Bhangi	Sialkot	Later joined the Bhangis.
43.	Baba Deep Singh			Leader martyred.
44.	Natha Singh			Leader martyred.
45.	Madan Singh			
46.	Mohan Singh		Ranian village	
47.	Bagh Singh Hallowal	Bhangi		
48.	Jhanda Singh		Sultan Vind village (near Amritsar)	
49.	Mirja Singh Tarkhan			
50.	Sham Singh Mann		Bulqichak village	
51.	Mala Singh			
52.	Bahal Singh		Shekupura village	
53.	Amar Singh			
54.	Hira Singh			
55.	Ganga Singh			
56.	Lal Singh			
57.	Tara Singh Mann		Mannawala village, Amritsar district	Later joined the Bhangis.
58.	Mehtab Singh		Lalpur village, Tarn Taran district	
59.	Roop Singh			
60.	Anoop Singh Nakai	Nakai		
61.	Dasaunda Singh	Nishanwalia		
62.	Tara Singh Gheba		Dallewal	
63.	Dharam Singh Khatri		Amritsar	
64.	Sukha Singh		Mari Kamboke village	
65.	Jassa Singh Ramgarhia			

Finally, on the annual Diwali meeting of the Sarbat Khalsa in Amritsar in 1748, the Jathas were reorganised into a new grouping called misls, with 11 Misls forming out of the various pre-existing Jathas and a unified army known as the Dal Khalsa Ji. Ultimate command over the Misls was bestowed to Jassa Singh Ahluwalia. The words Jatha and Jathedar began to fall into disuse after this point, as leaders of Misls preferred the term 'Sardar' to refer to themselves, due to Afghan influence.

=== Dissolution ===
After the rise of Maharaja Ranjit Singh and the establishment of the Sikh Empire, various aspects of 18th century Sikhism, including Jatha formations, were abolished.

== Equipment ==
18th century warriors of a jatha were equipped at-first with knobbed clubs, spears, battle axes, bow and arrows, and matchlocks. As mandatory for a Khalsa, all the warriors were equipped with a long-sword and dagger (kirpan). Some but not all of the warriors wore body armour, excluding helmets. Horses were incredibly valued and mounts of high-quality were targeted during raids on the enemy transport convoys (columns and baggage trains).

Later-on as the Jathas succeeded in capturing hostile resources, they came into the possession of more firearms in the form of matchlocks to equip their ranks with. The Sikhs avoided the use of heavy-artillery pieces as it impeded their military strategy of being quick and mobile. As per Rattan Singh Bhangu in his Panth Prakash, some light-artillery pieces were used by the Sikhs of this era, such as zamburaks (camel-mounted swivel cannons) and a long-range musket known as a janjail.

== Revival ==
The terms "jatha" and "jathedar" were revived during the Singh Sabha movement to refer to "bands of preachers and choirs", an association which survives until the present-day. However, during the later Gurdwara reform movement, the terms began to take on a martial tone once again, resuscitating and harking back to the 18th century's context for the word. The group of Sikhs protesting and fighting for the freedom of Sikh shrines and places of worship from the control of hereditary mahants were termed Akali Jathas. The term Jatha began to refer to a "band of [Sikh] volunteers going forward to press a demand or to defy an unjust fiat of the government". This semantic of the word is still used.

=== Sikh Jatha during British rule ===
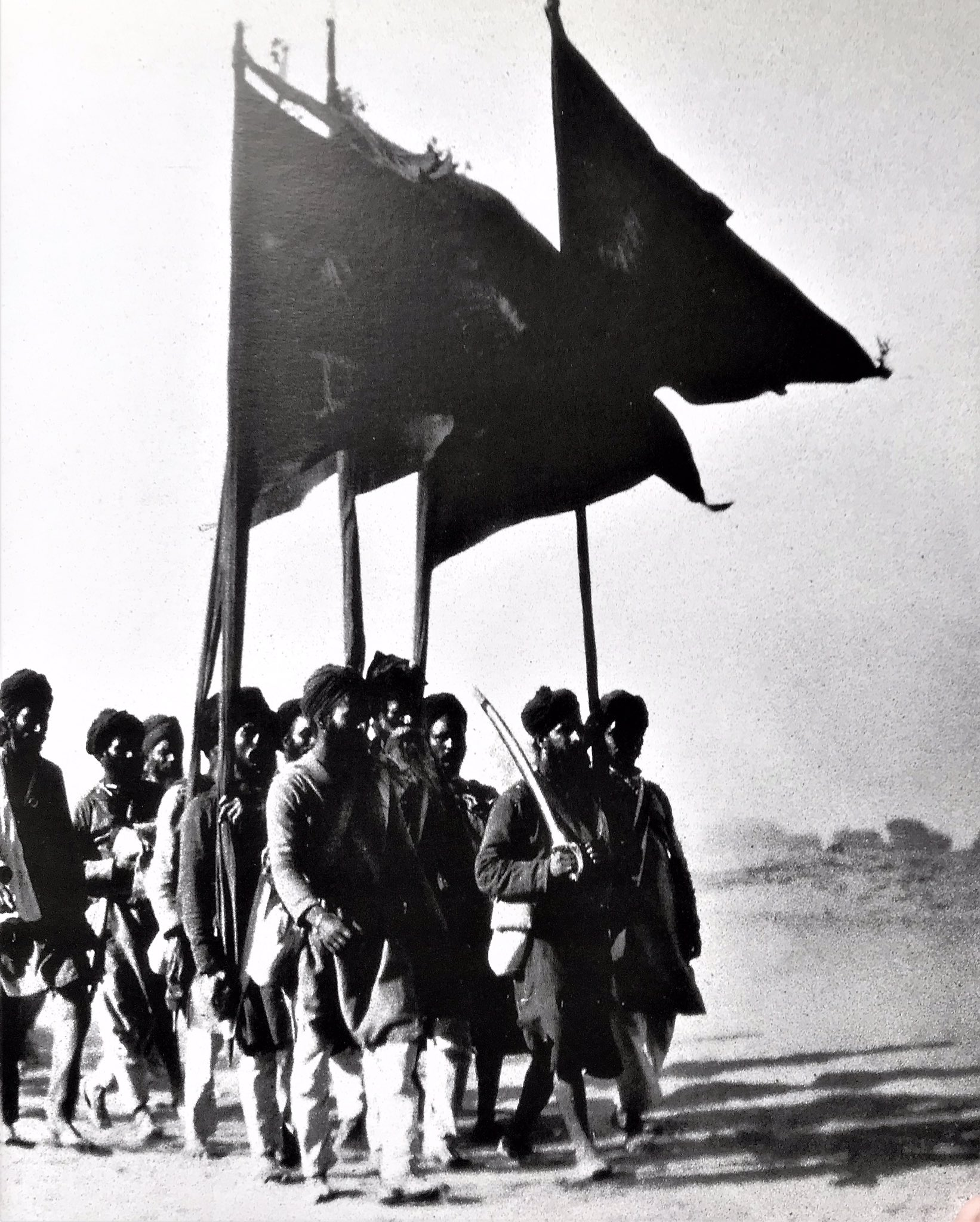
Photograph of the 2nd Shahidi Jatha procession at Jaito, showing the Nishan Sahib carriers, circa February 1924 during the Jaito Morcha

Jathas existed during the British Raj in the Punjab, northern India. During this time, the British imprisoned many Sikhs, Hindus and Muslims, and many villages and towns being raided by the British colonial police. During these difficult times, Sikhs began forming jathas and new armed squads in British India, and many villages and towns relied on the protection of the Sikh jathas. Sikhs carried out many attacks and assassinations on the British, resulting in many Sikhs arrested and executed. The Sikhs played an influential role in the Indian independence movement. Prominent figures include Bhagat Singh and Udham Singh, who traveled to London and hunted down people who got away with the killings in India. Most Sikh prison inmates were executed after the assassination of the high ranking British officer John Simon, 1st Viscount Simon, head of the Simon Commission from the British Parliament. There was also a bombing targeting the British courts. Bhagat Singh was said to have been behind most of the actions carried out against the British and was later hanged.

Some Sikh jathas such as the Babbar Akali Movement, formed in 1921, rejected non-violence and gave stiff resistance to the British, which led to small battles and assassinations, and eventually by 1939 were down to large shootouts.

The term Shahidi Jatha ("band of martyrs"), used during the Gurdwara Reform movement, referred to a jatha that had previously been arrested but continue to agitate even after their release as part of a movement, such as at the Jaito Morcha.

=== Partition of Punjab ===
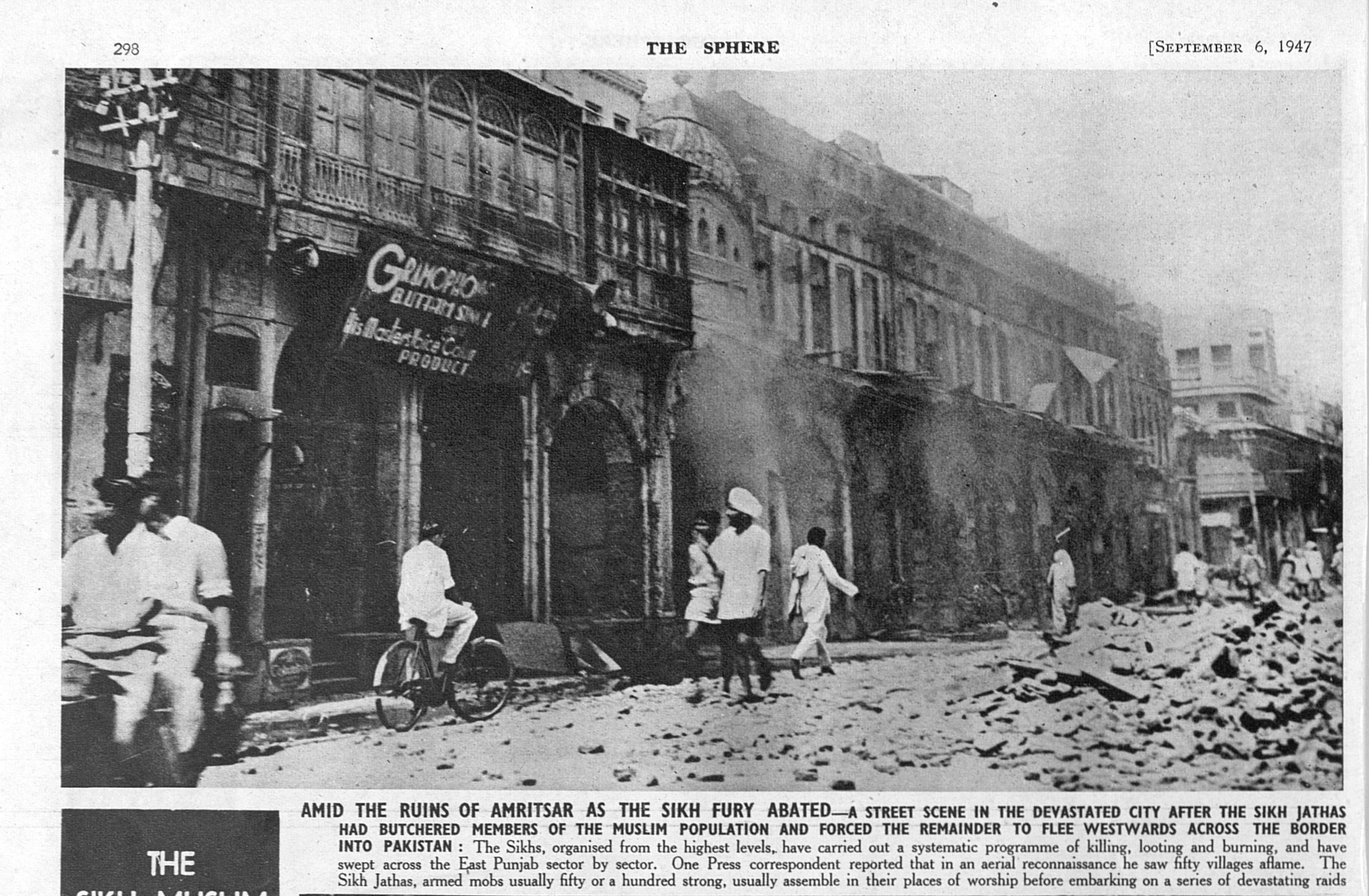
Photograph of the aftermath of the streets of Amritsar after Muslim locals were evicted and butchered by Sikh jathas, The Sphere, 6 September 1947

During the Partition of Punjab in 1947, many Sikhs began to form armed Jathas for both defensive and offensive purposes against Muslims. These Jathas were well organised, often aided and armed by the rulers of the various Sikh states of Punjab.

When British rule came to an end in India, it had to make the crucial decision of determining the borders of the new country of Pakistan. Some historians say the biggest mistake the British made before they left India was splitting the Sikh main land of Punjab in two, giving one half to the Islamic government of Pakistan and the other half to be run by a Hindu government. This led to non-stop bloodshed between many Sikhs and Muslims. Thousands of Muslims fled the East Punjab for Pakistan and thousands of Sikhs left Pakistan to go to "New" Punjab, but this journey resulted in thousands of lives lost due to massacres committed by both sides.

== See also ==
- Violence against women during the partition of India
- Babbar Akali movement
