= List of pigeon breeds =

== Pigeon Breeds ==
This is an alphabetical list of pigeon breeds; these are exclusively breeds of the domestic pigeon (Columba livia). Other Columbidae species (e.g., the Barbary dove, Streptopelia risoria) have been domesticated and developed into specific breeds. Forms can vary widely in the Color and pattern of their plumage, body structure, and behavior unlike their rock dove ancestor.

Sometimes breeds of pigeons are known by two or more names. When this occurs, Breeds in the list use a common name followed by an = sign and the (AKA) also known as name. In-depth descriptions of the breed, are often linked to the list.

== A ==
- Aachen Cropper (D/326)
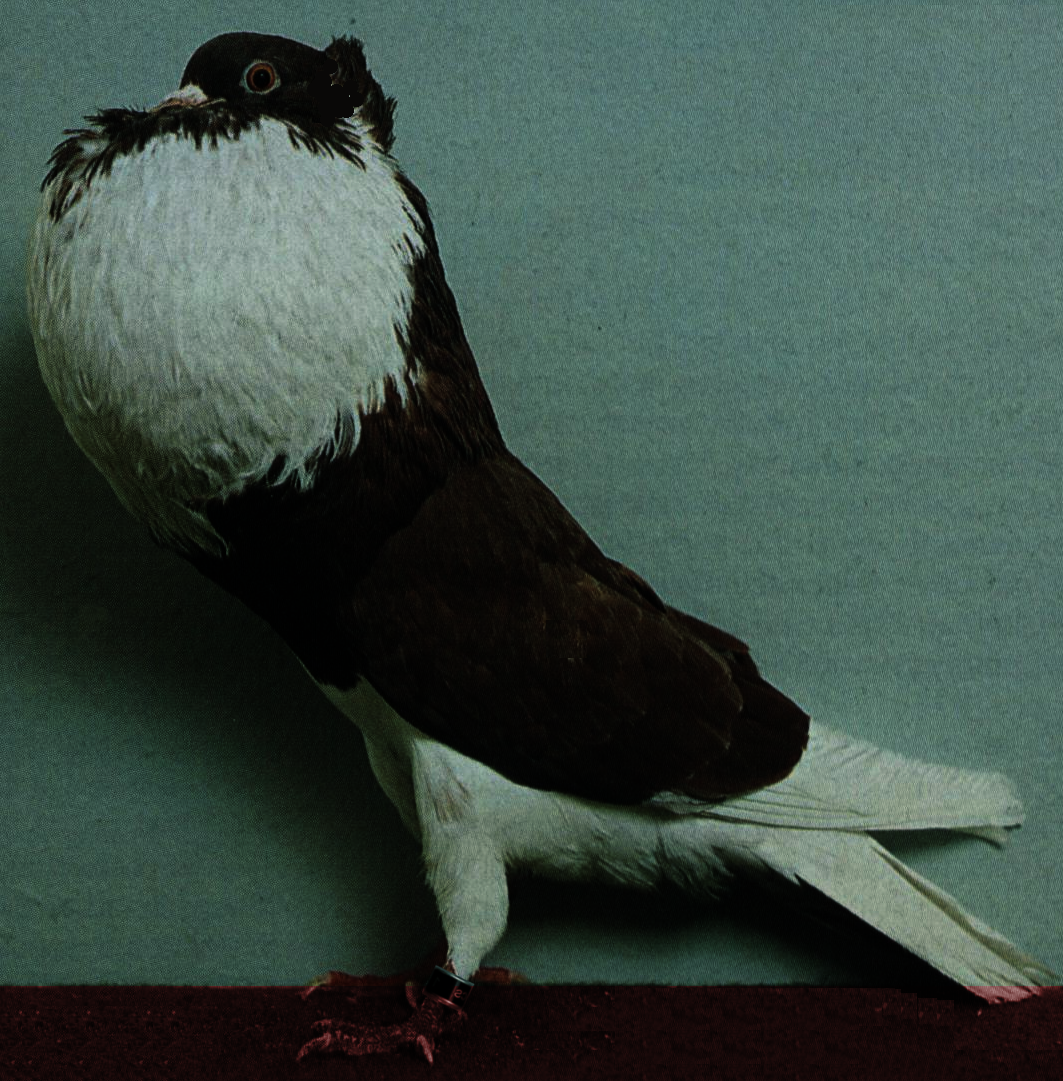
Aachen Cropper red
- Aachen Lacquer Shield Owl pigeon (= Aachen Luster Shield, ELFP-No. D/705; = Aachen Shield Owl)
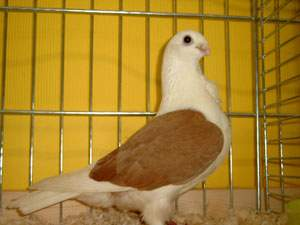
Aachener Lackschild Mövchen Red
- Aargae Peak-crested = Aargauer Weißschwanz (D/410)
- Abu Abse-Dewlap (D/063)
- African Owl pigeon (GB/710)
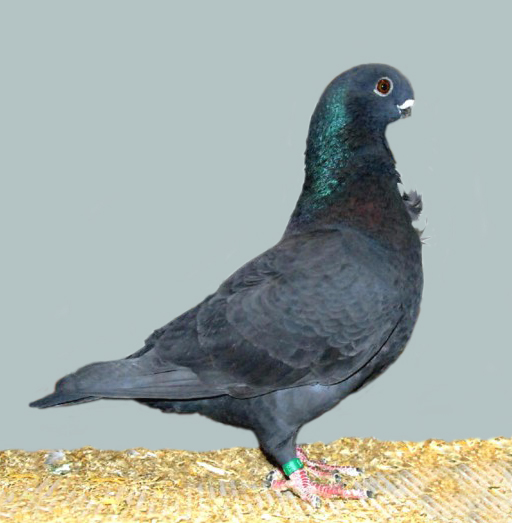
Black African Owl
- Agaran Pigeon (RUS^{(D)}/893)
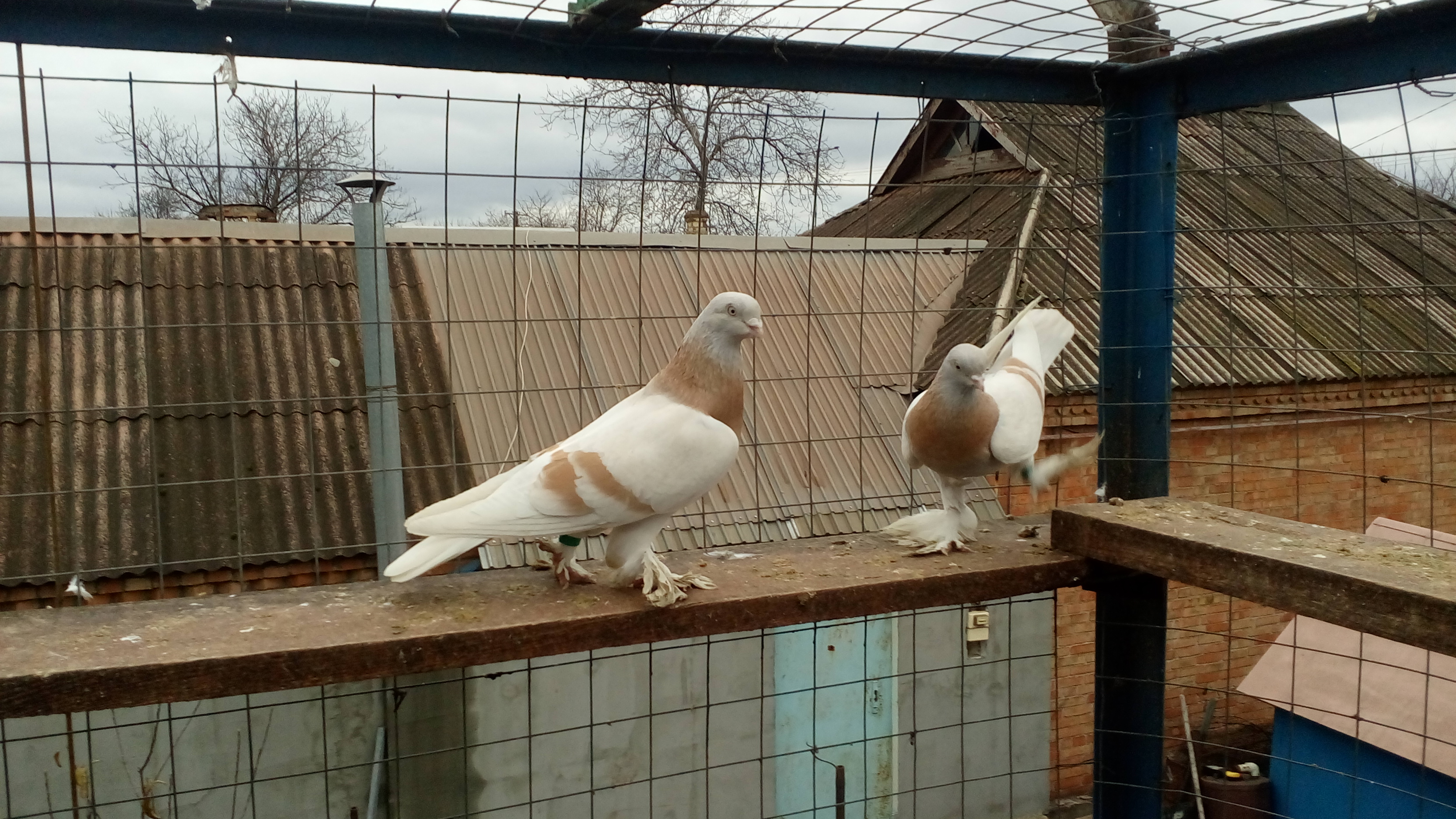
Агаран
- Alsace Cropper (B/308)
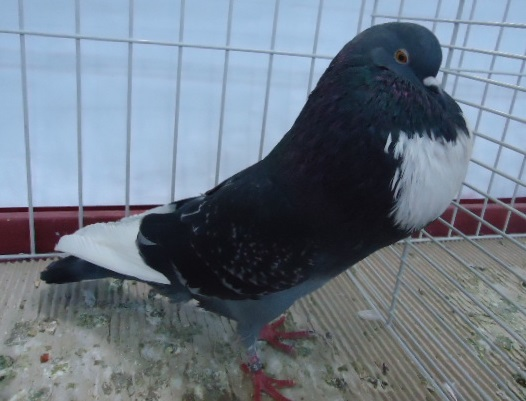
Black Alsace Cropper

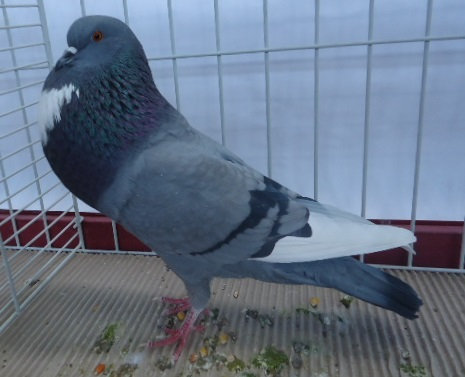
Blue Bar Alsace Cropper
- Altenburg Trumpeter (D/513)
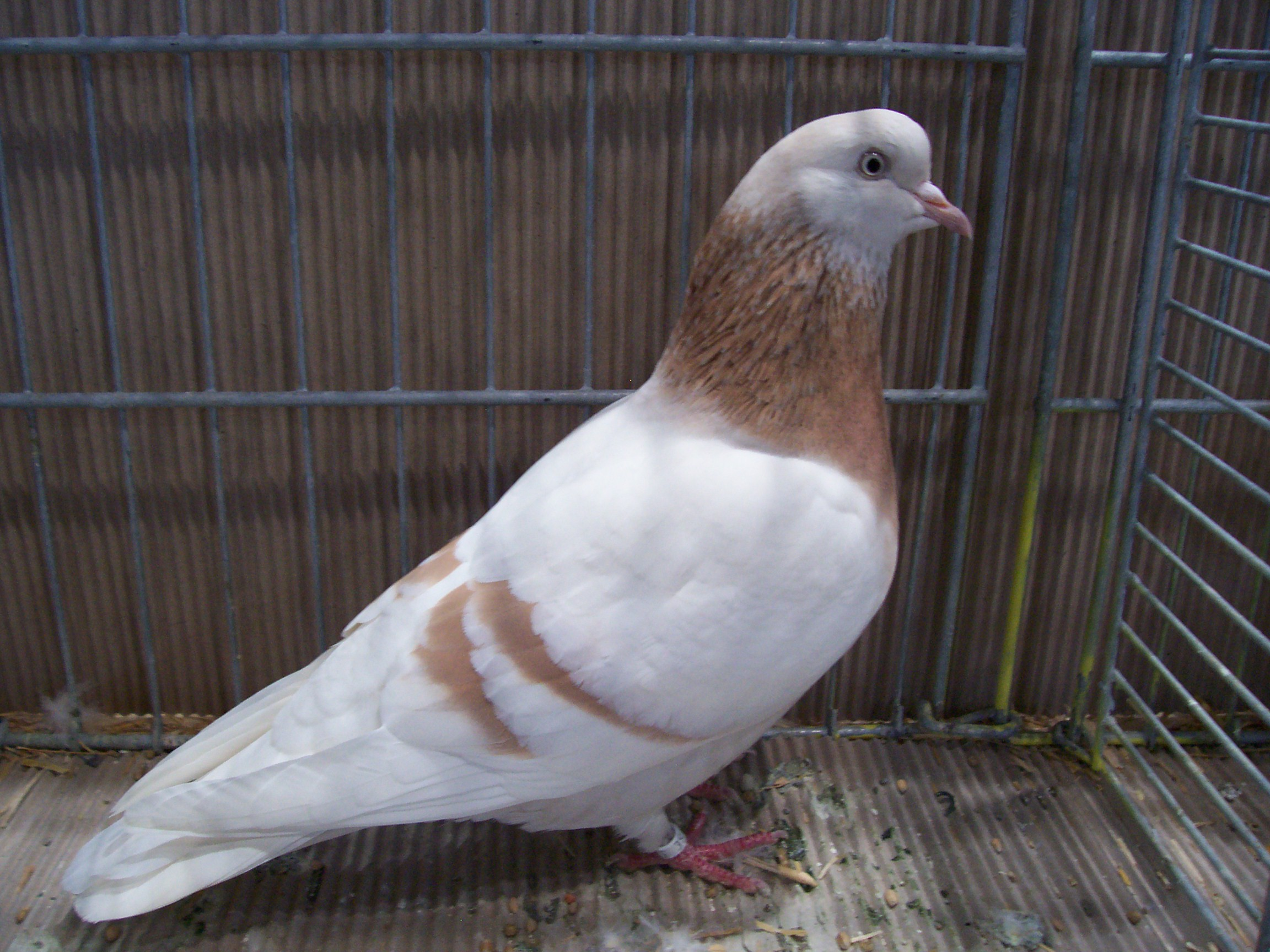
Yellow Bar Altenburg Trumpeter

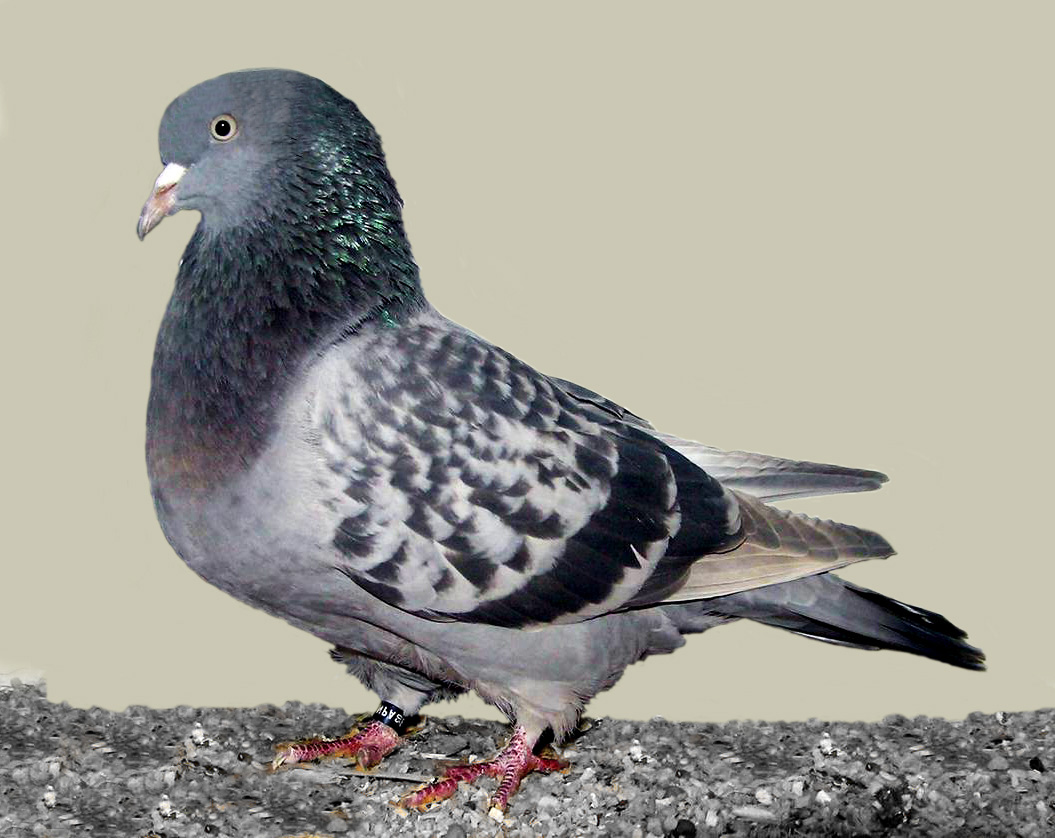
Blue Check Altenburg_Trumpeter
- American Bohemian Pouter
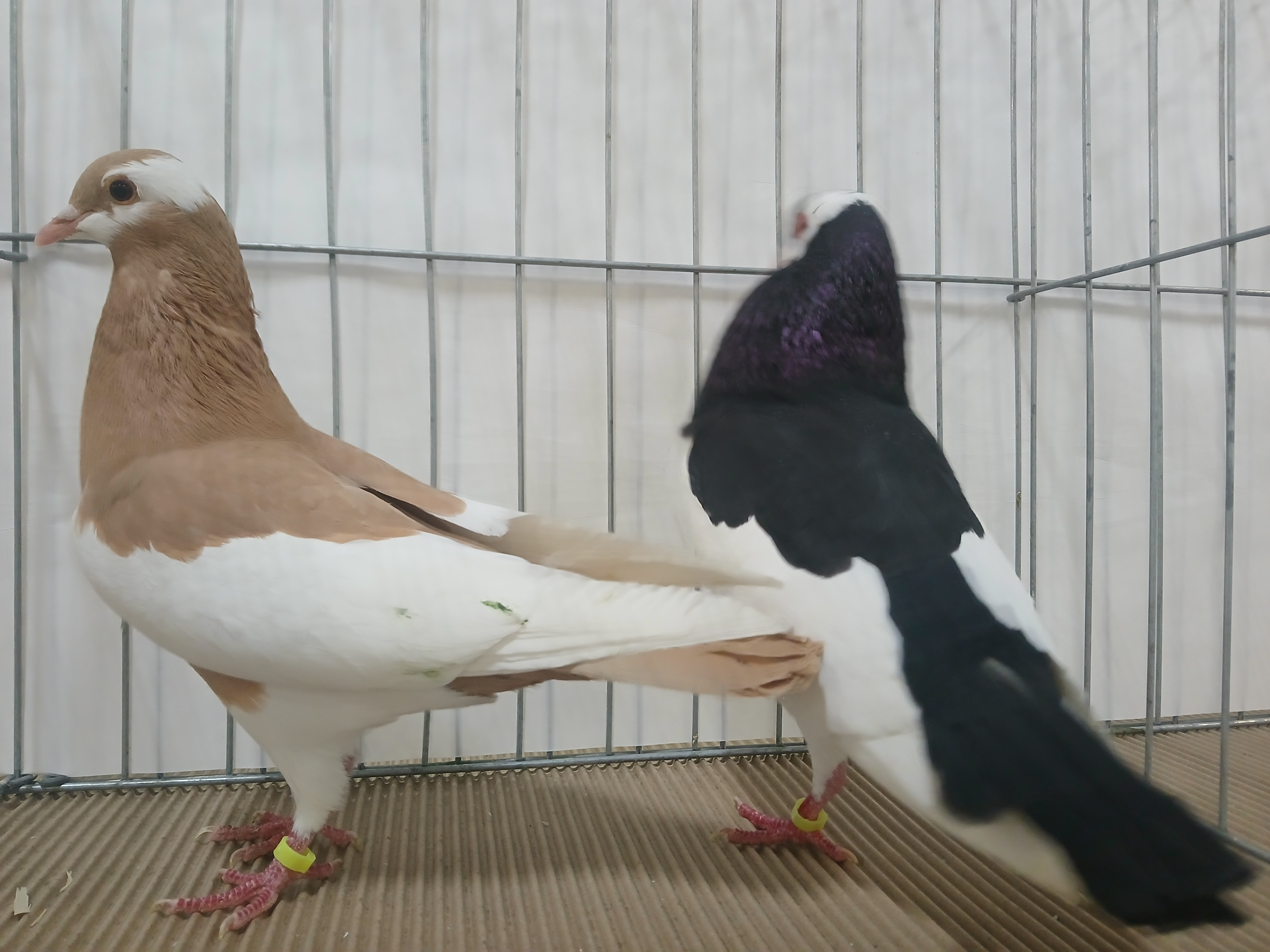
Pair shown at 2026 NPA national
- American Domestic Show Flight
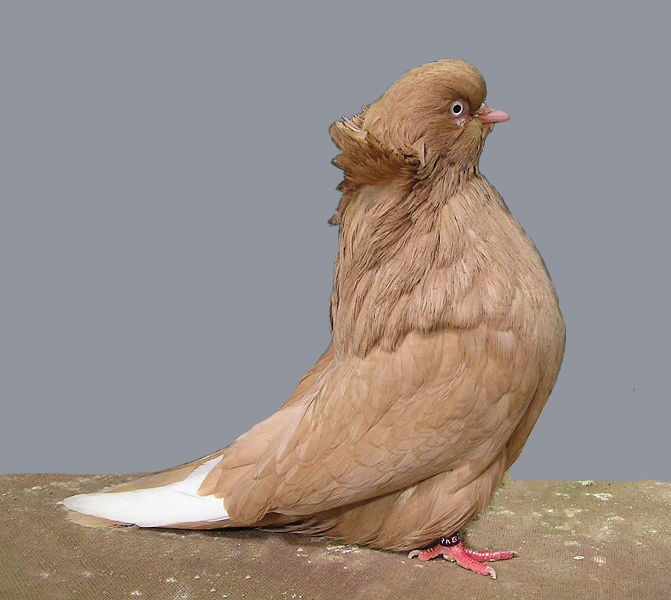
Yellow crested
- American Flying Baldhead Tumbler
- American Flying Flight
- American Flying Tumbler
- American Giant Homer (= Giant Homer (ESKT/030))
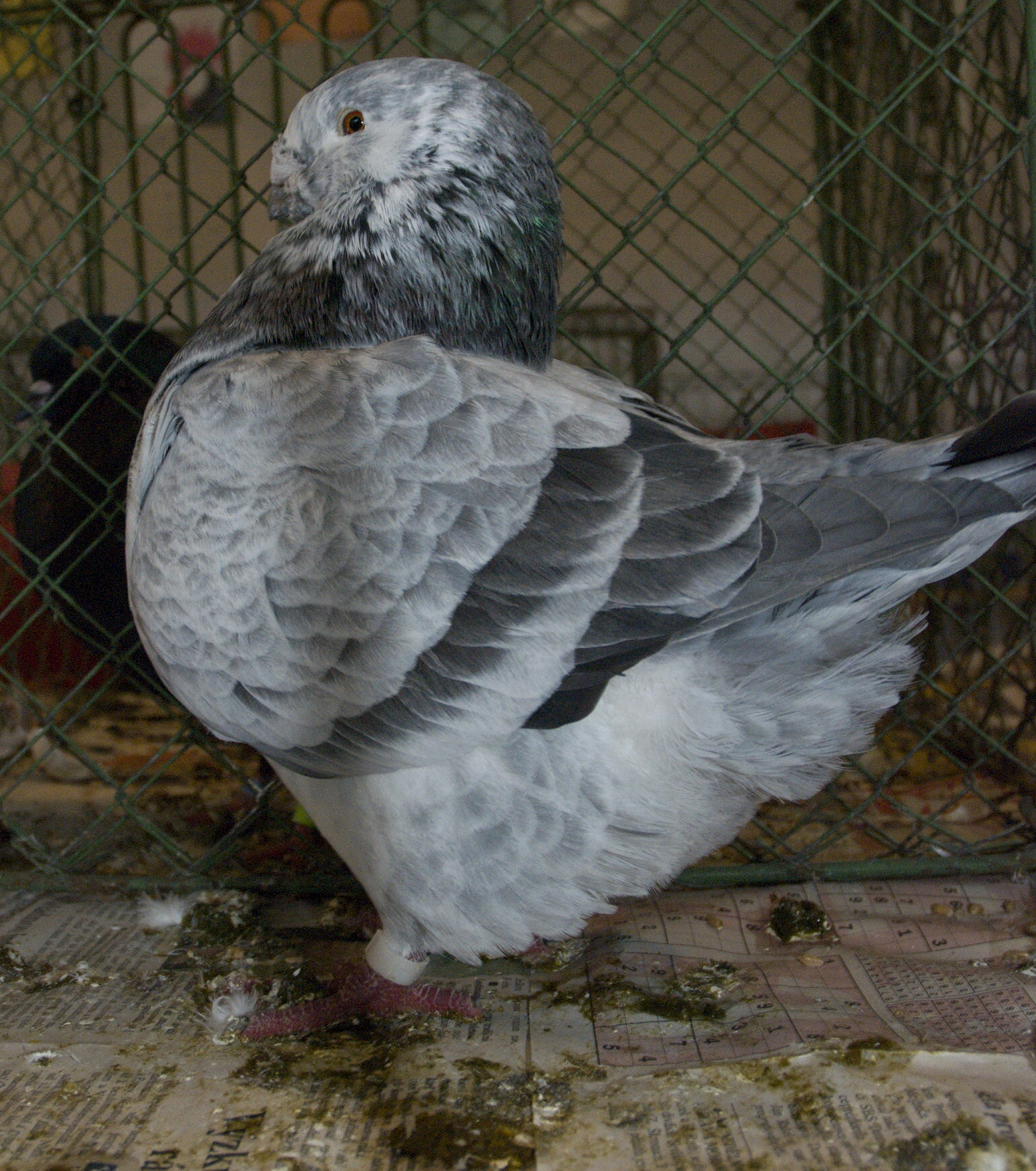
Giant Homer: Grizzle
- American Giant Rumbler
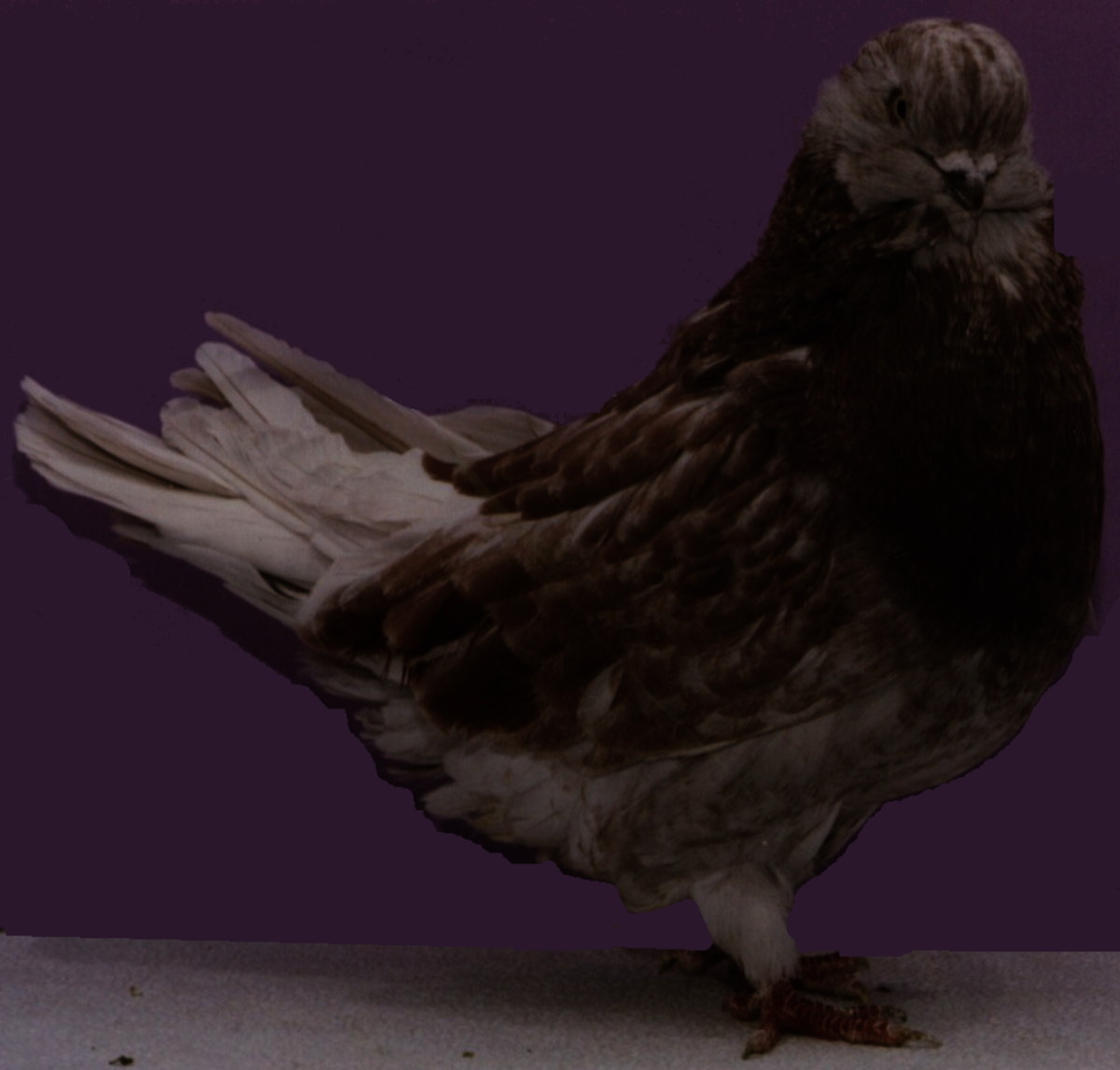
Giant Rumbler Red Check
- American Giant Runt
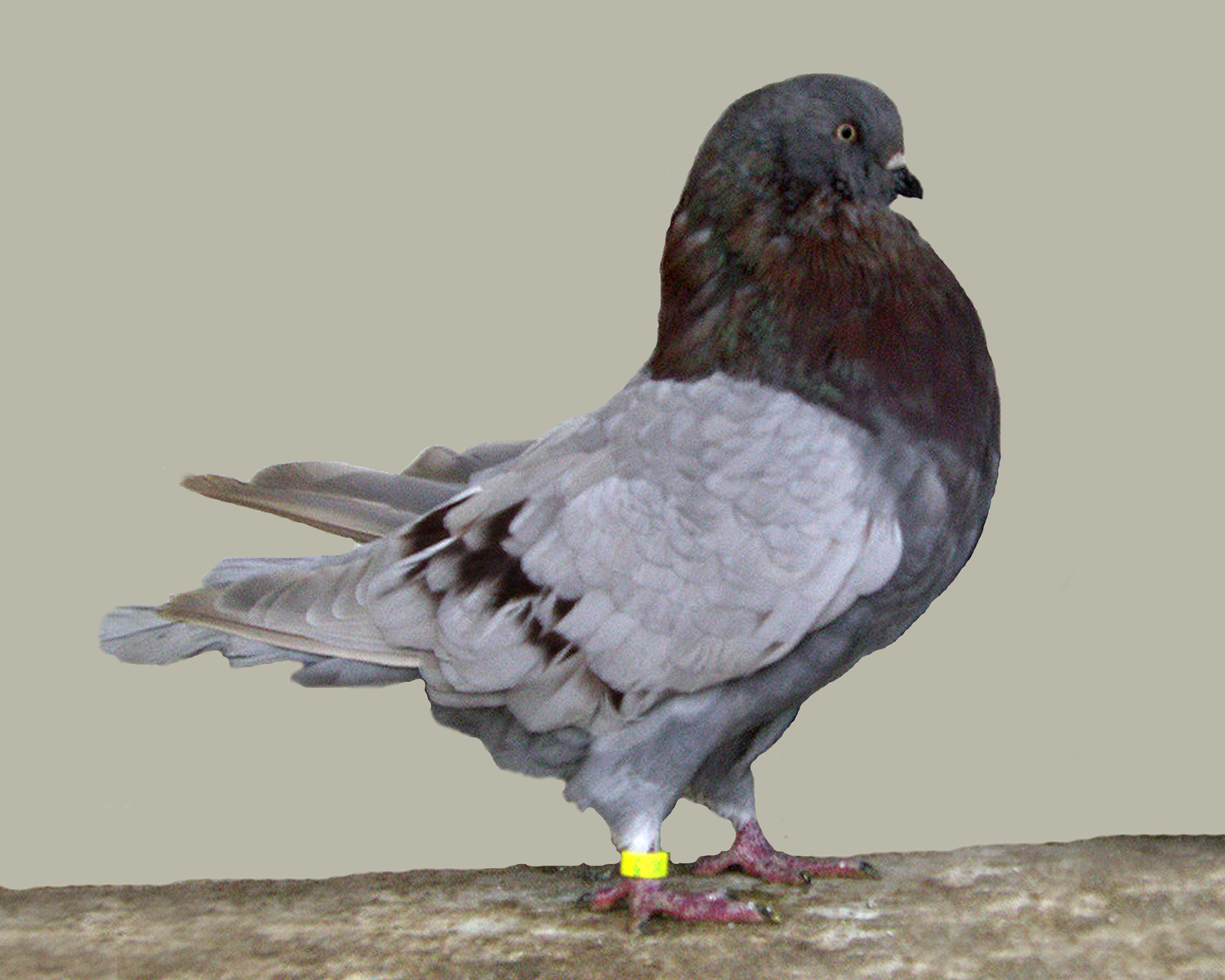
Giant Runt Mealie
- American Modern Flight
- American Roller
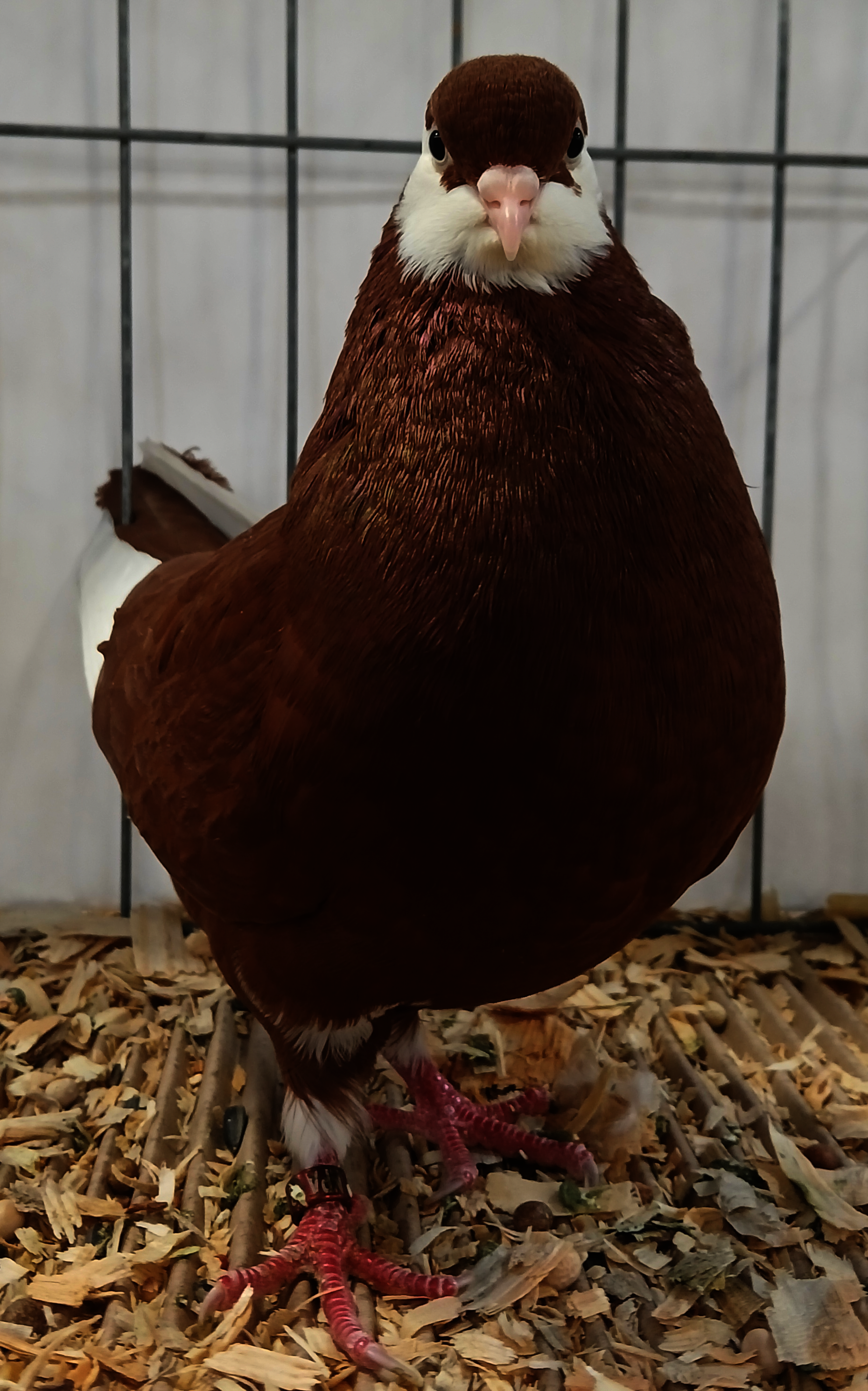
Red

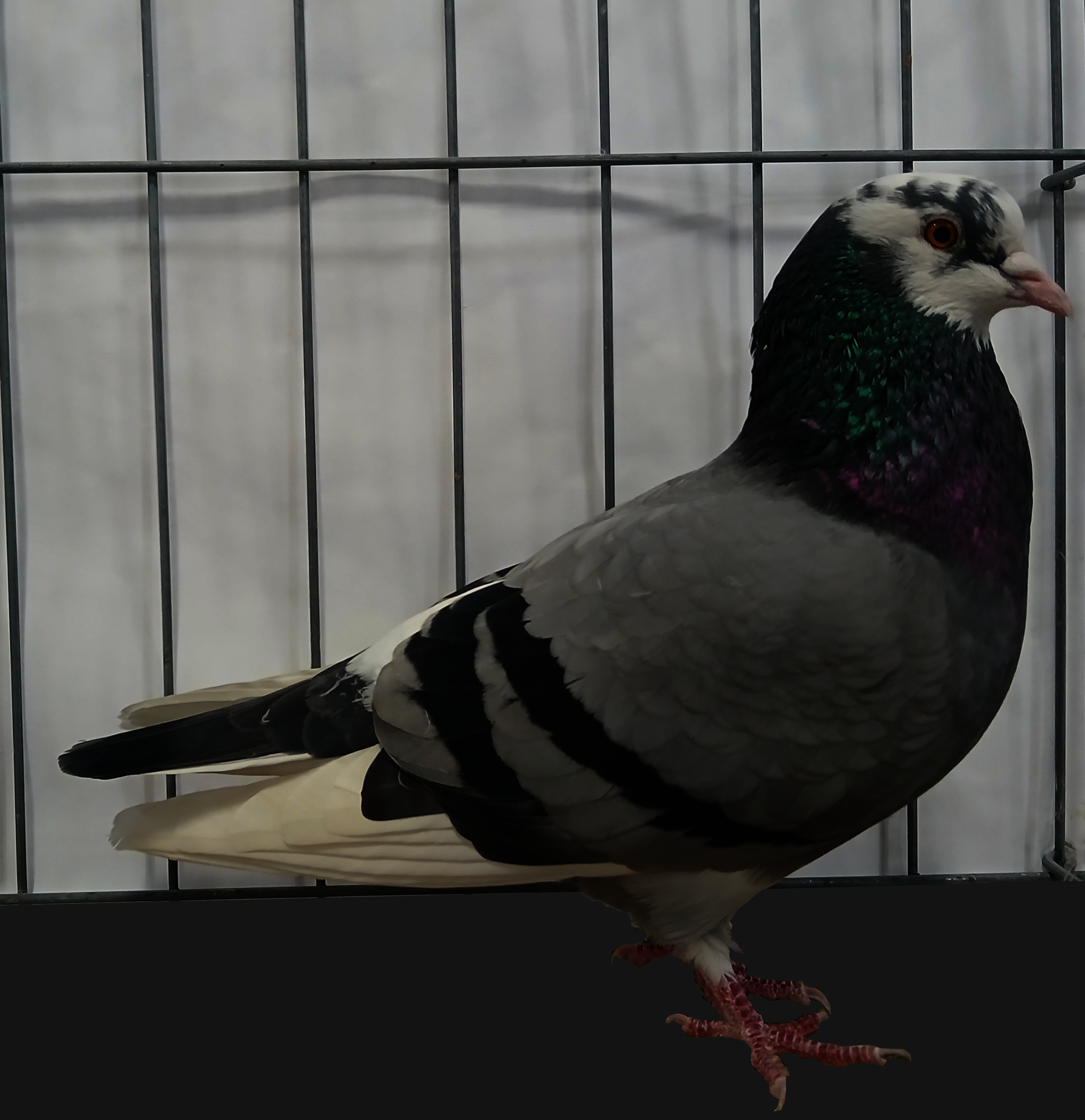
Blue bar
- American Show Racer (ESKT/031)
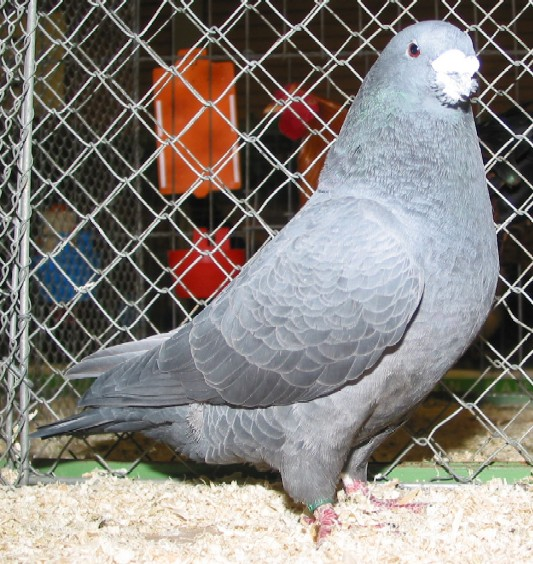
Show Racer Dark Check

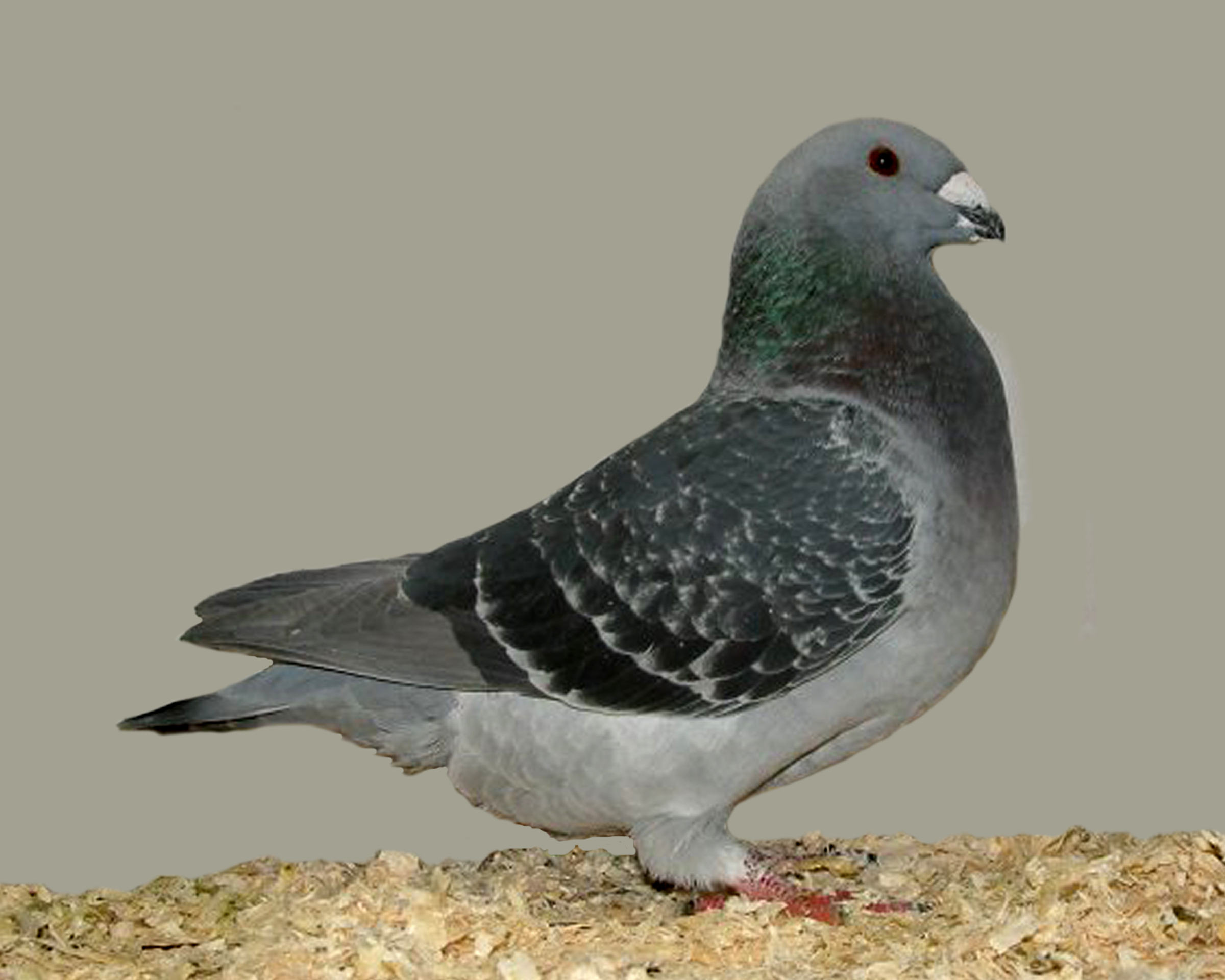
Show Racer Blue Check
- American Strassers = Strasser
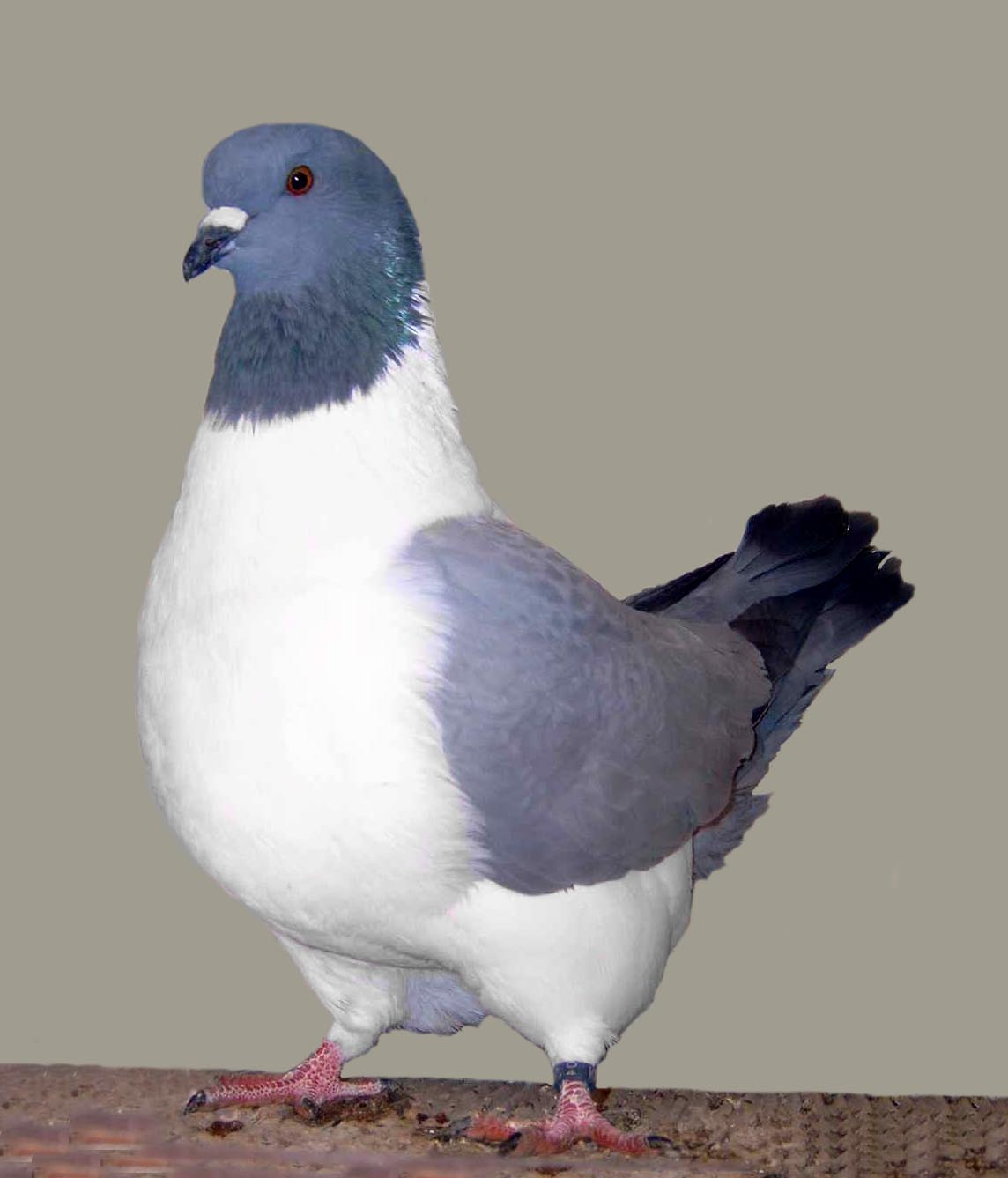
Strasser barless blue
- Amsterdam Beard Tumbler (NL/929)
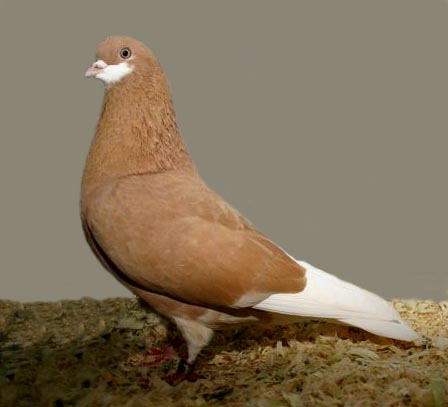
Yellow

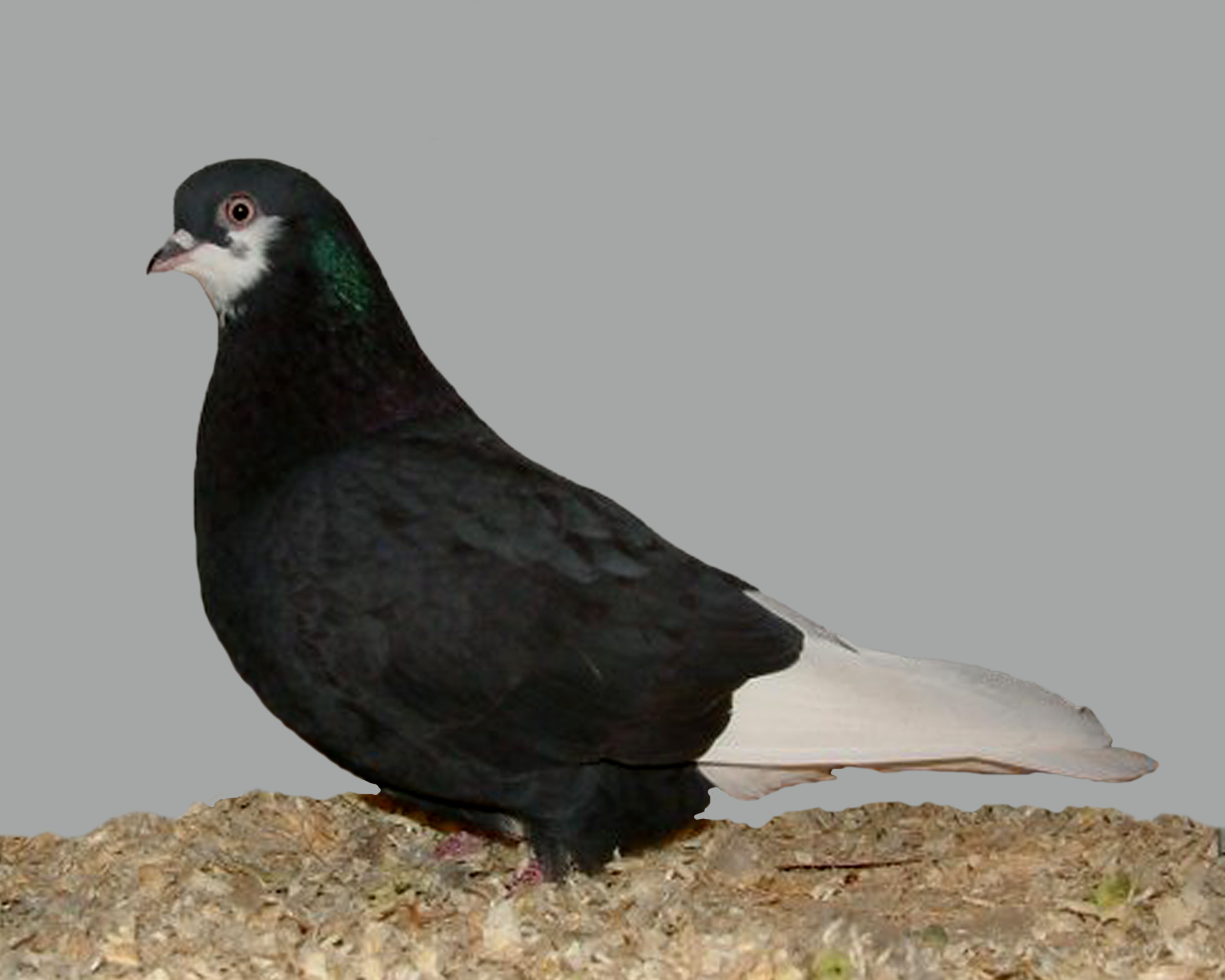
Black
- Anatolian Owl pigeon (D/713)
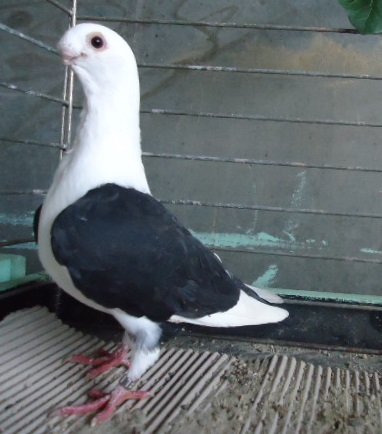
Pigeon_cravaté anatolien noir
- Anatolian Ringbeater (TR^{(D)}/1104)
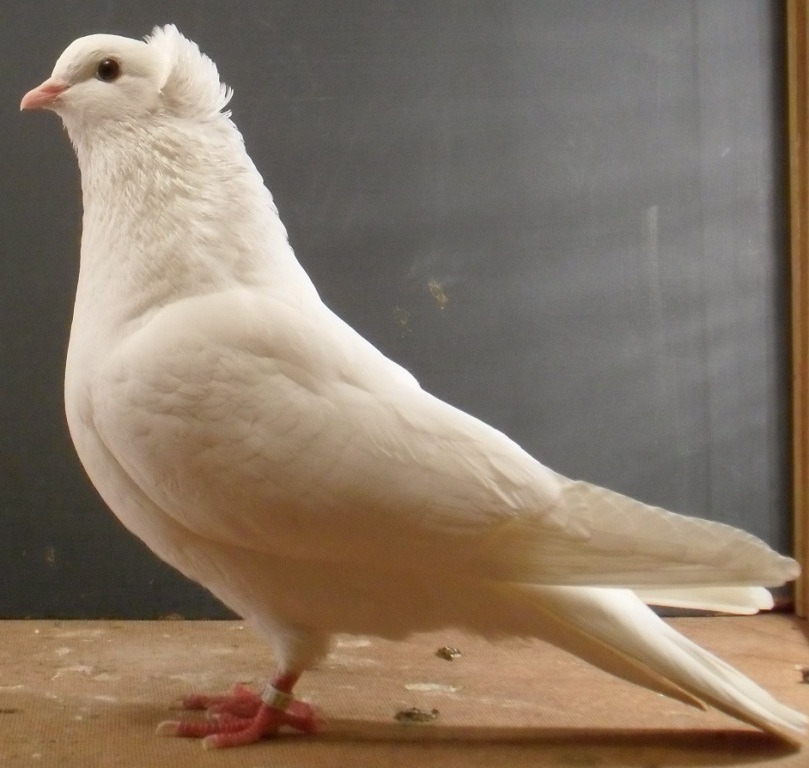
Anatolian Ringbeater, white
- Ancient Tumbler (D/907)
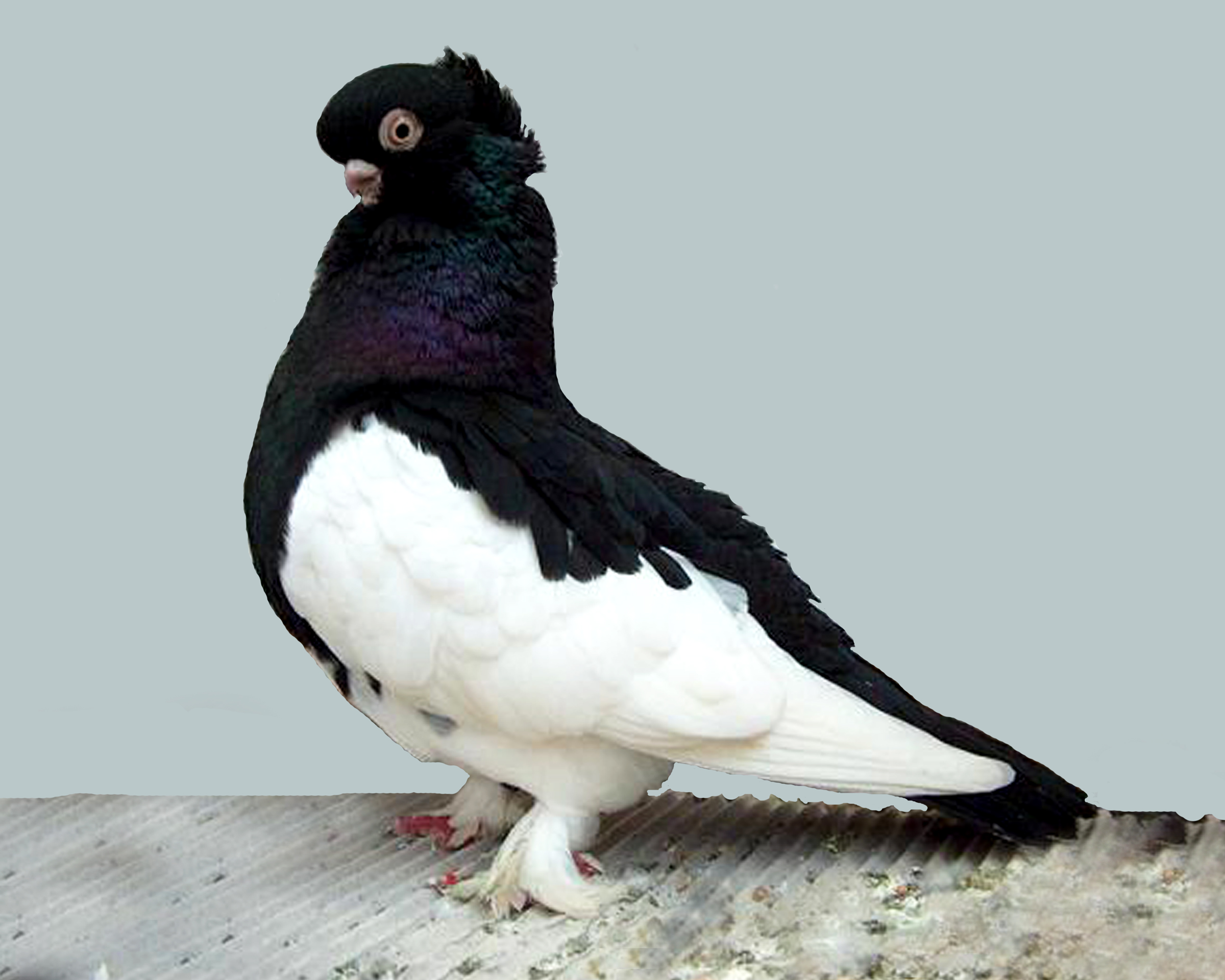
Crested magpie-marked
- Apatin Tumbler (SRB/939)
- Antwerp pigeon (= Show Antwerp, (GB/026))
- Antwerp Smerle (B/701)
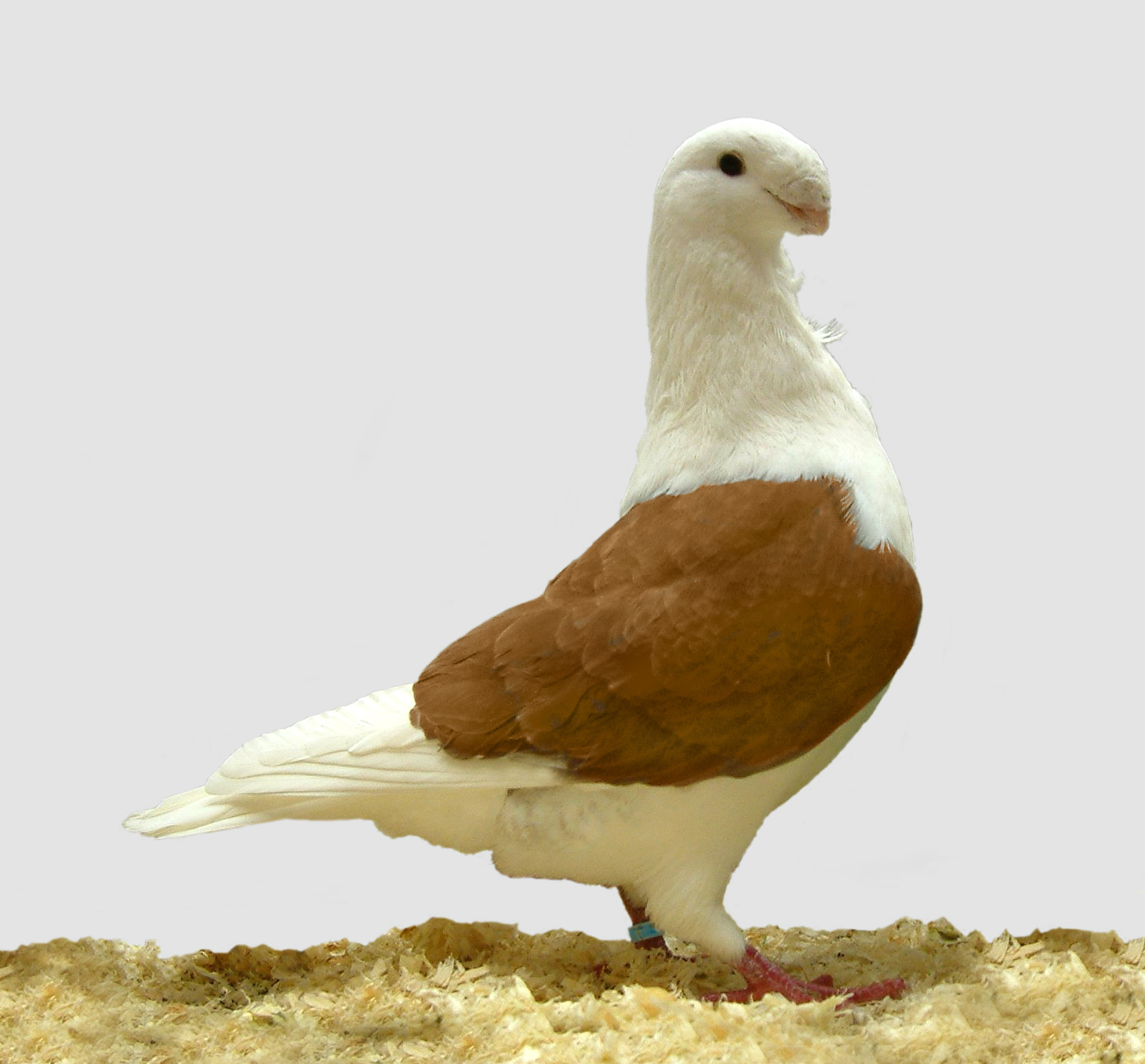
  Antwerp Smerle Yellow
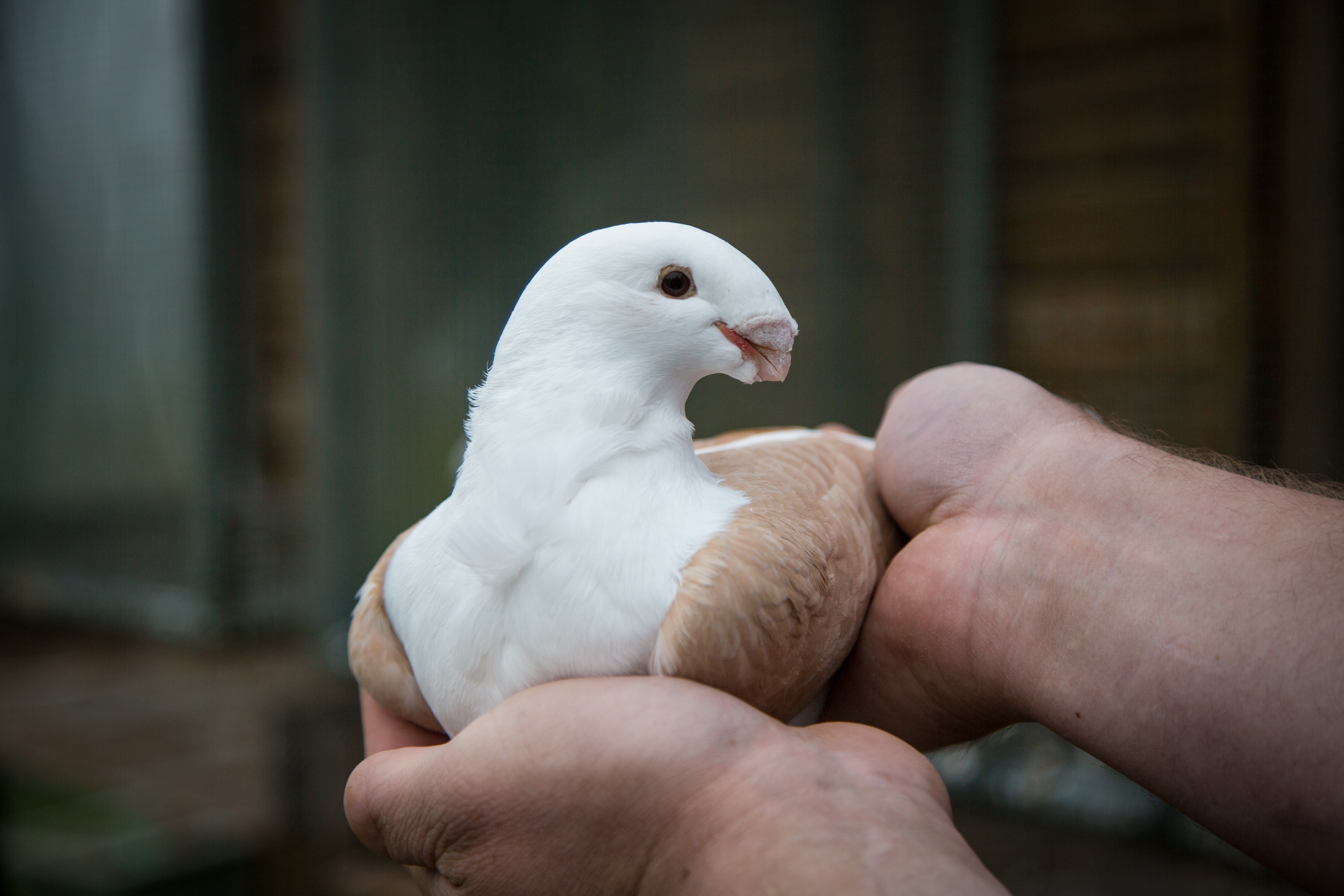
  Antwerp Smerle Head View
- Arabian Trumpeter (D/514)
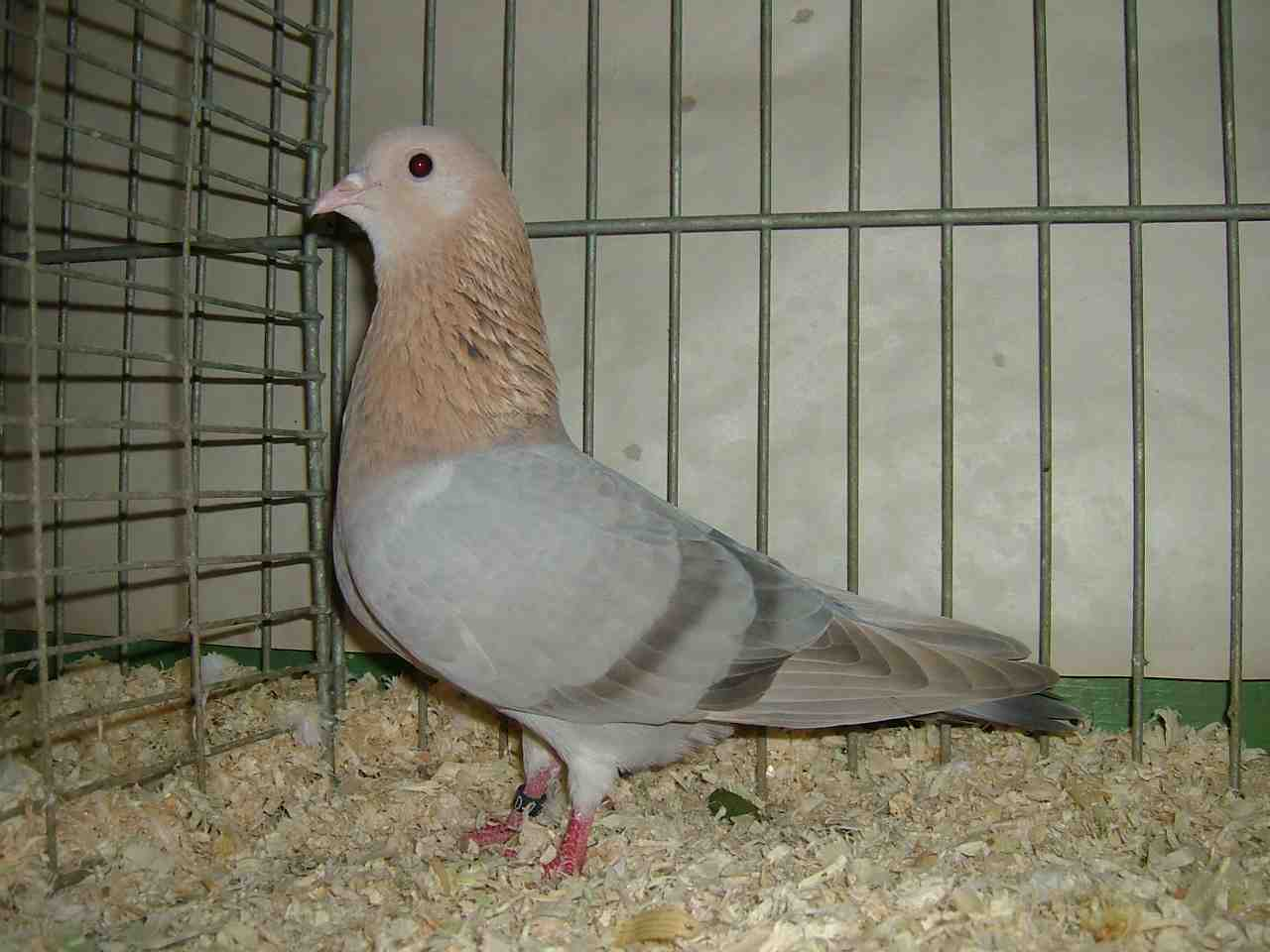
Arabische Trommeltauben Gelb Atlasfarbig

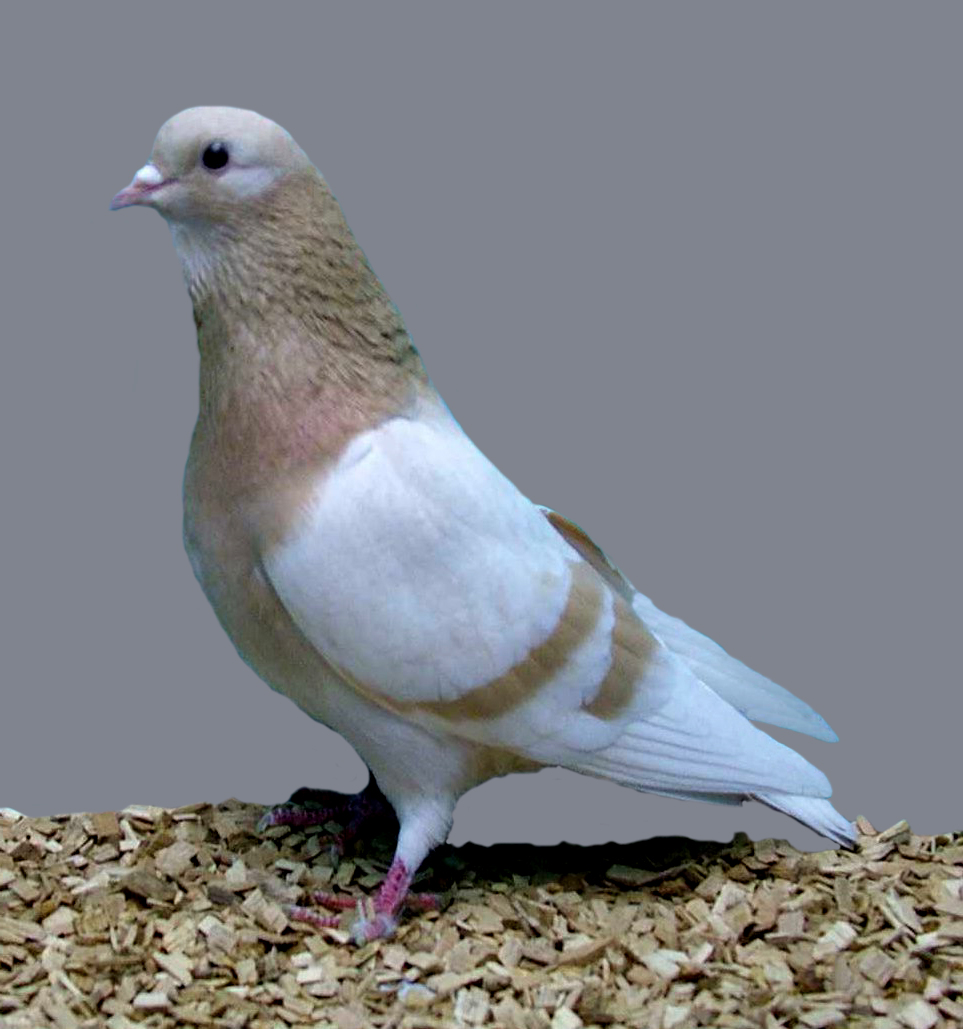
Arabian Trumpeter Cream Barred

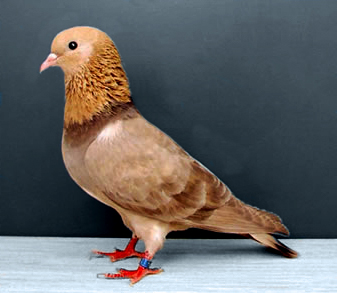
Arabian Trumpeter Brown Atlas

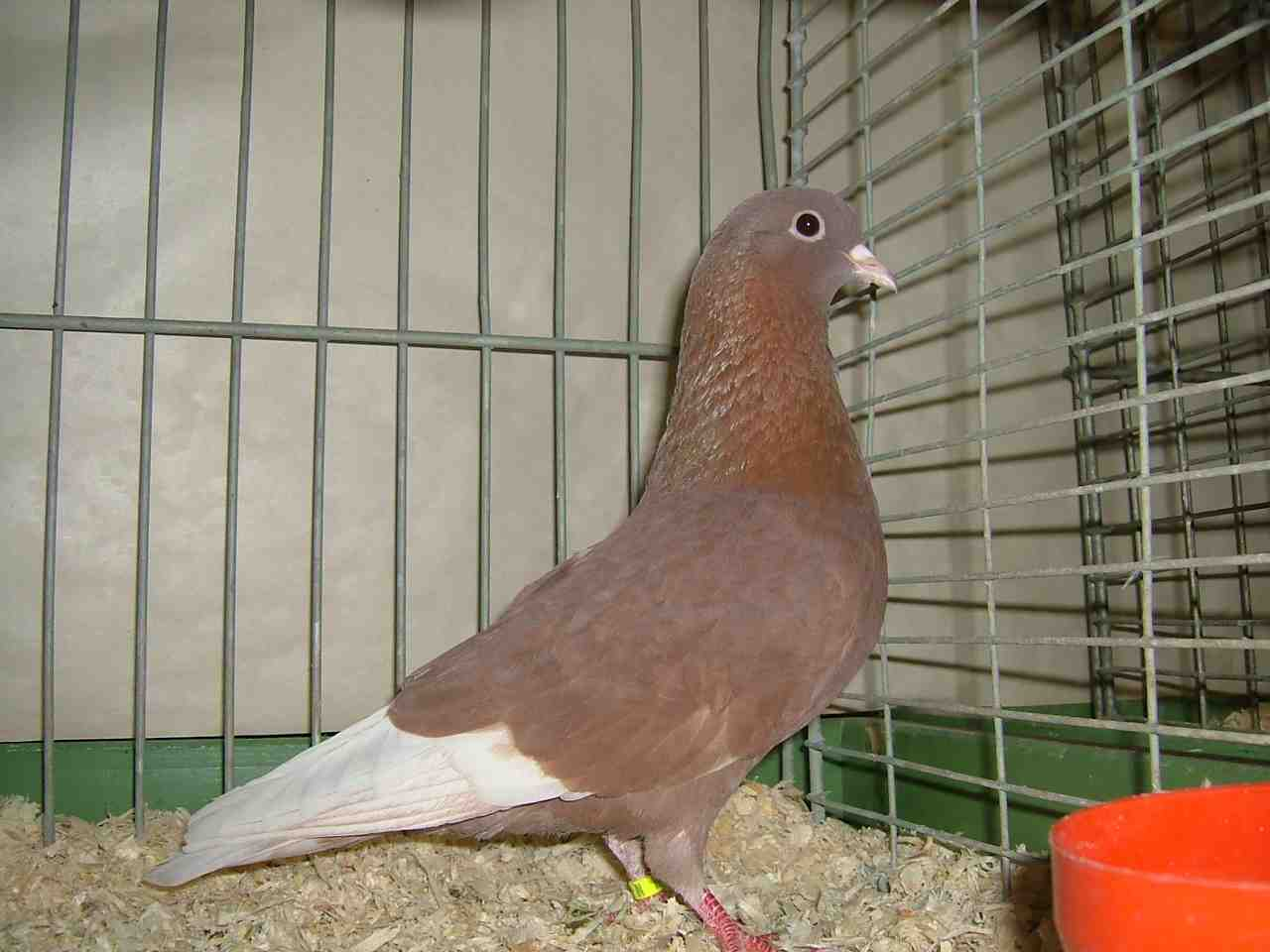
Arabische Trommeltauben Dominant Rot
- Arad Barred Highflyer
- Arad Tumbler (RO^{(D)}/933)
- Archangel pigeon (= Gimpel (D/402); Croatian: Golub Arkanđeo)
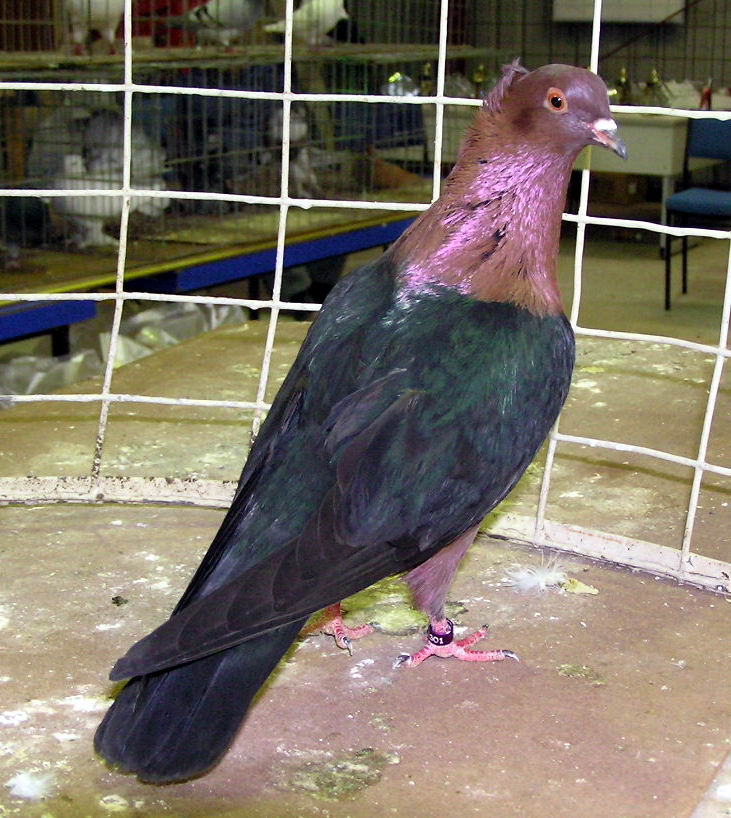
Archangel

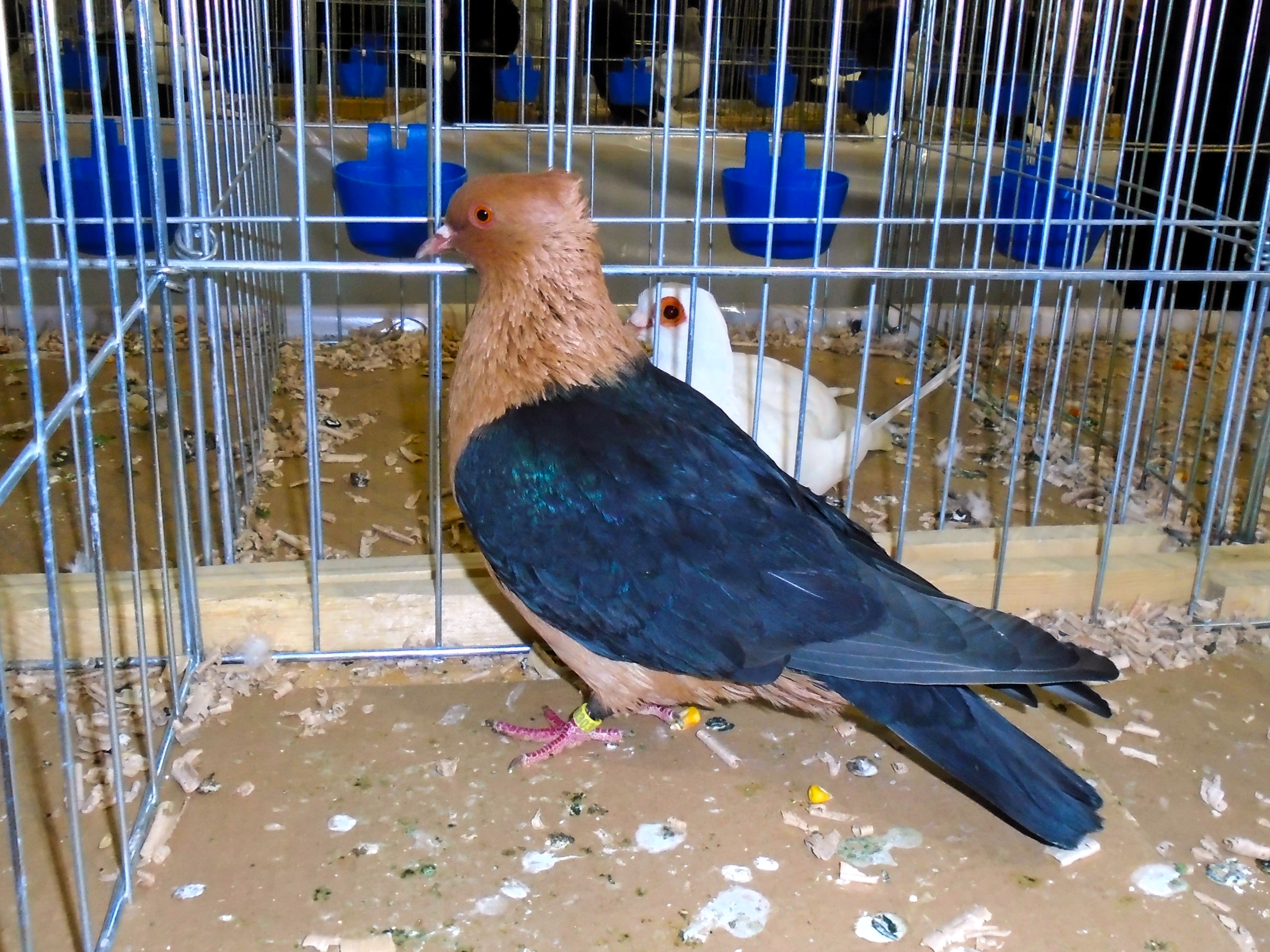
Gold Archangel
- Archangel White Trjasuni
- Argovien White-tail (CH/410)
- Armenian Tumbler
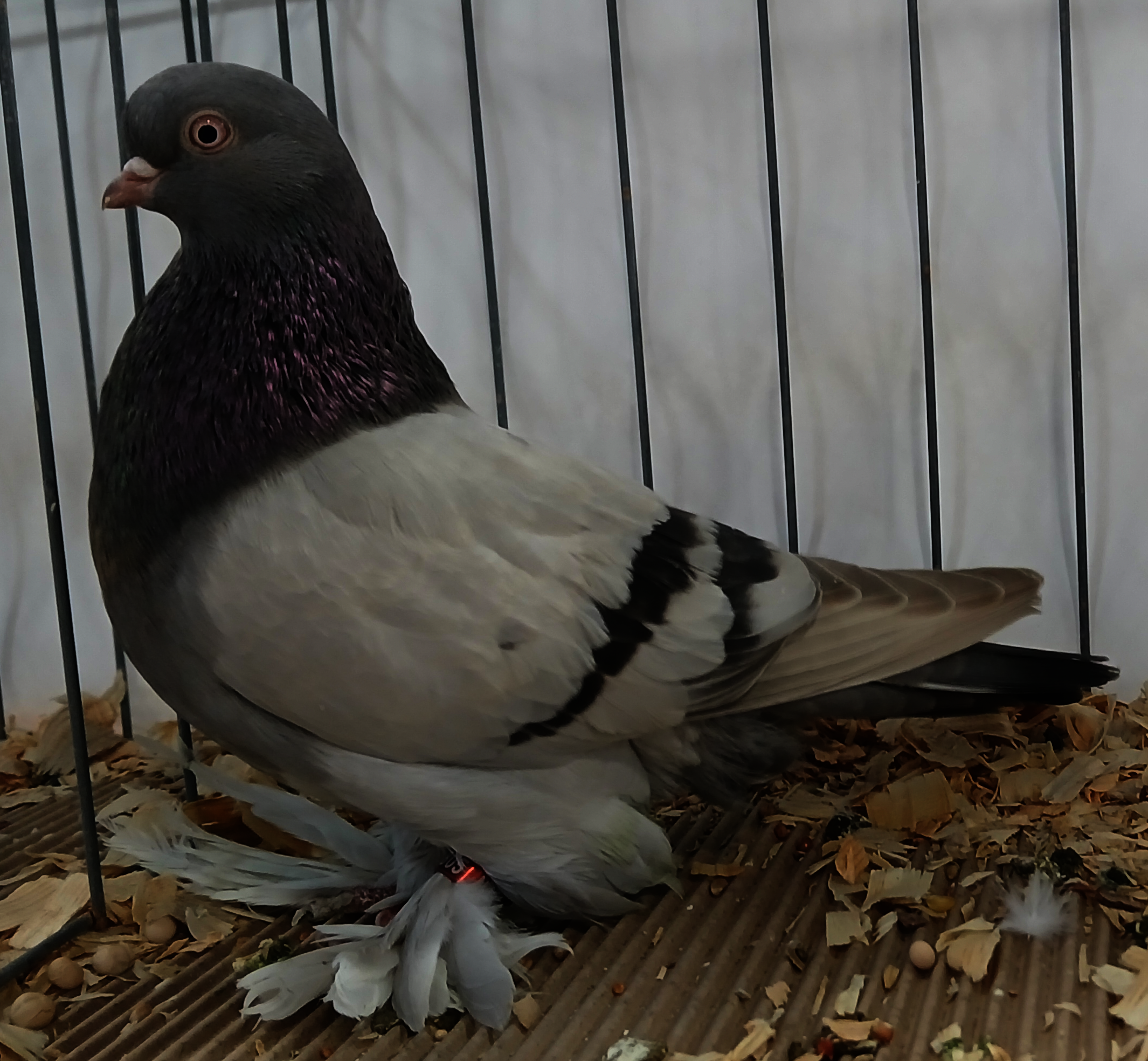
Blue bar

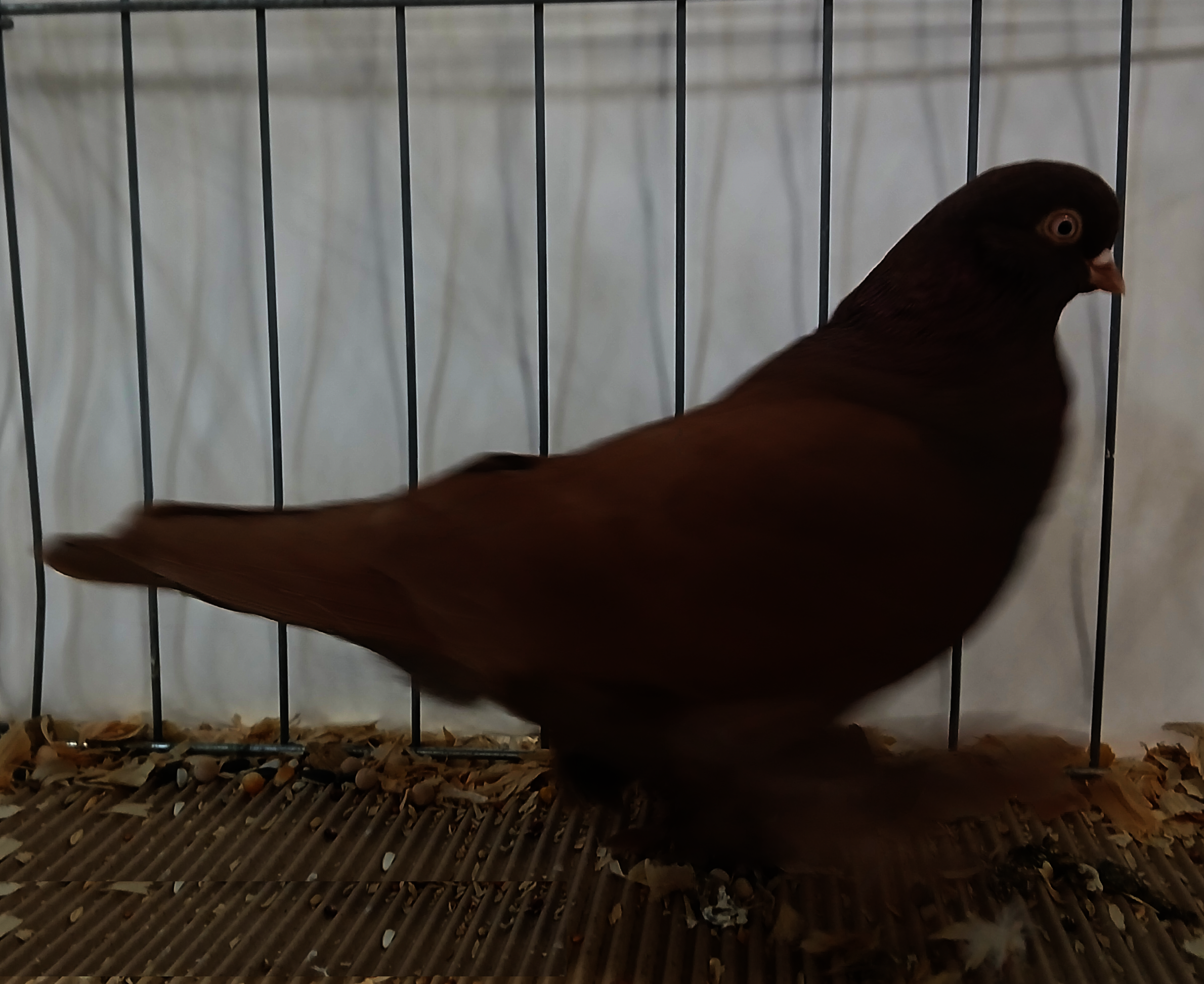
Red
- Asiatic Crack Tumbler (Turkish Takla Tumbler)
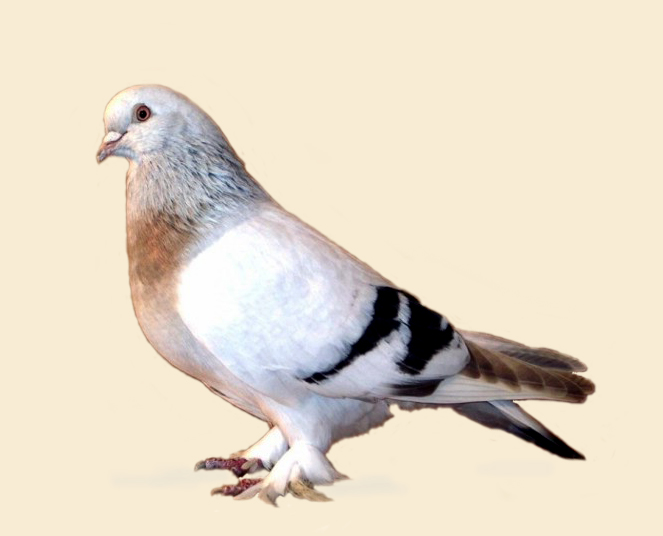
Takla Tumbler Silver Bar
- Australian Performing Tumbler
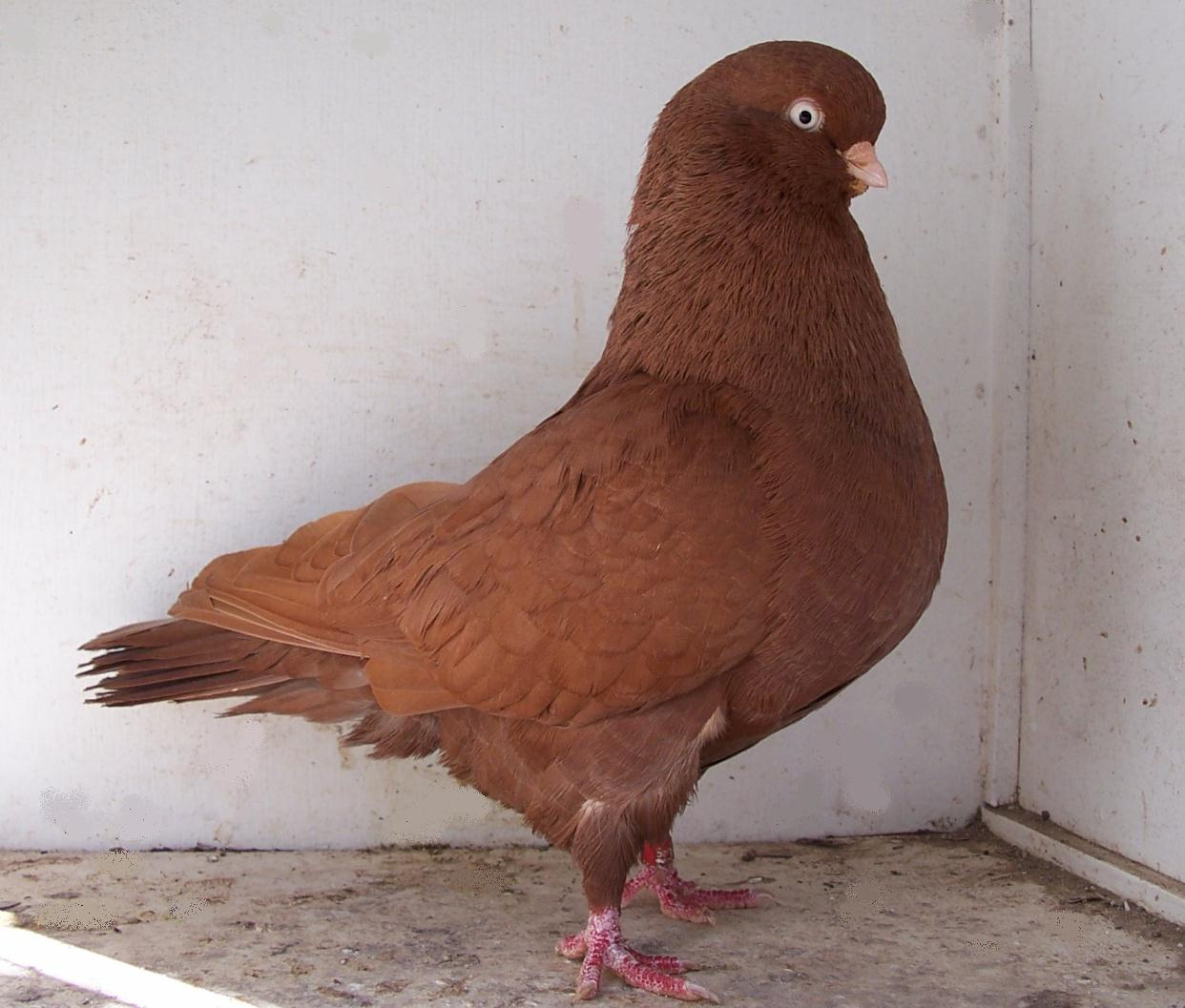
Australian Performing Tumbler Red
- Australian Saddleback Tumbler
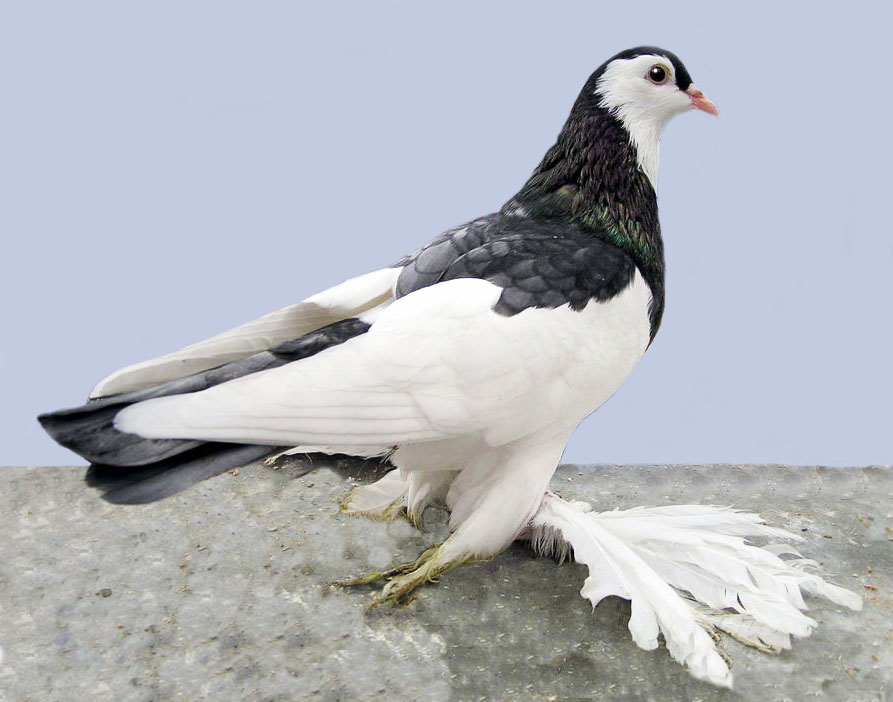
Australian Saddleback Tumbler Black
- Austrian Fischer Pigeon, Australian Fisher Pigeon (A/486)
- Austrian Magpie Cropper (A/351)
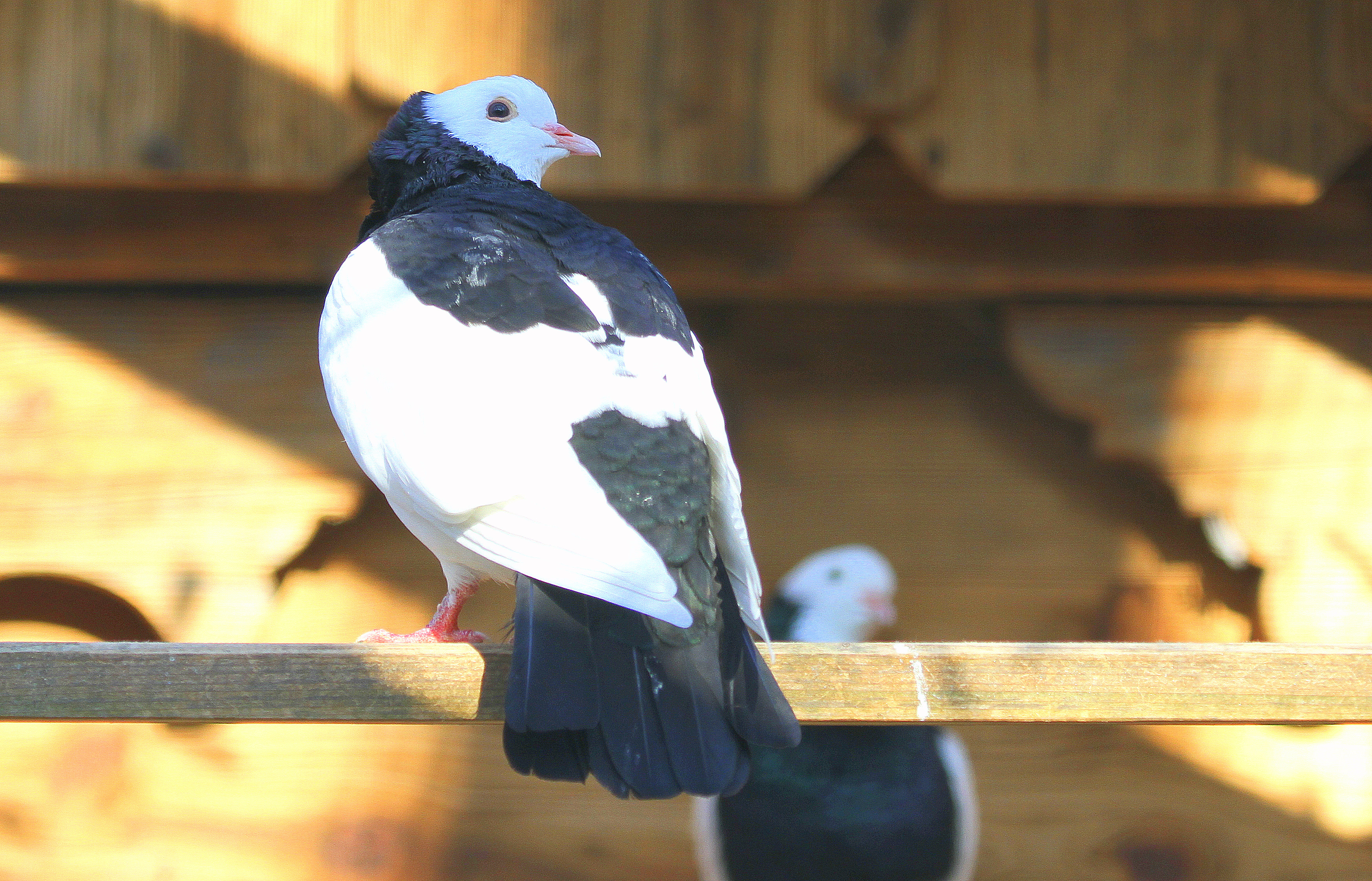
Österreichischer Ganselkröpfer
- Austrian White-tail (A/464) name EE black tail

== B ==
- Baja Tumbler (H/954)
- Baku Boinije Tumbler
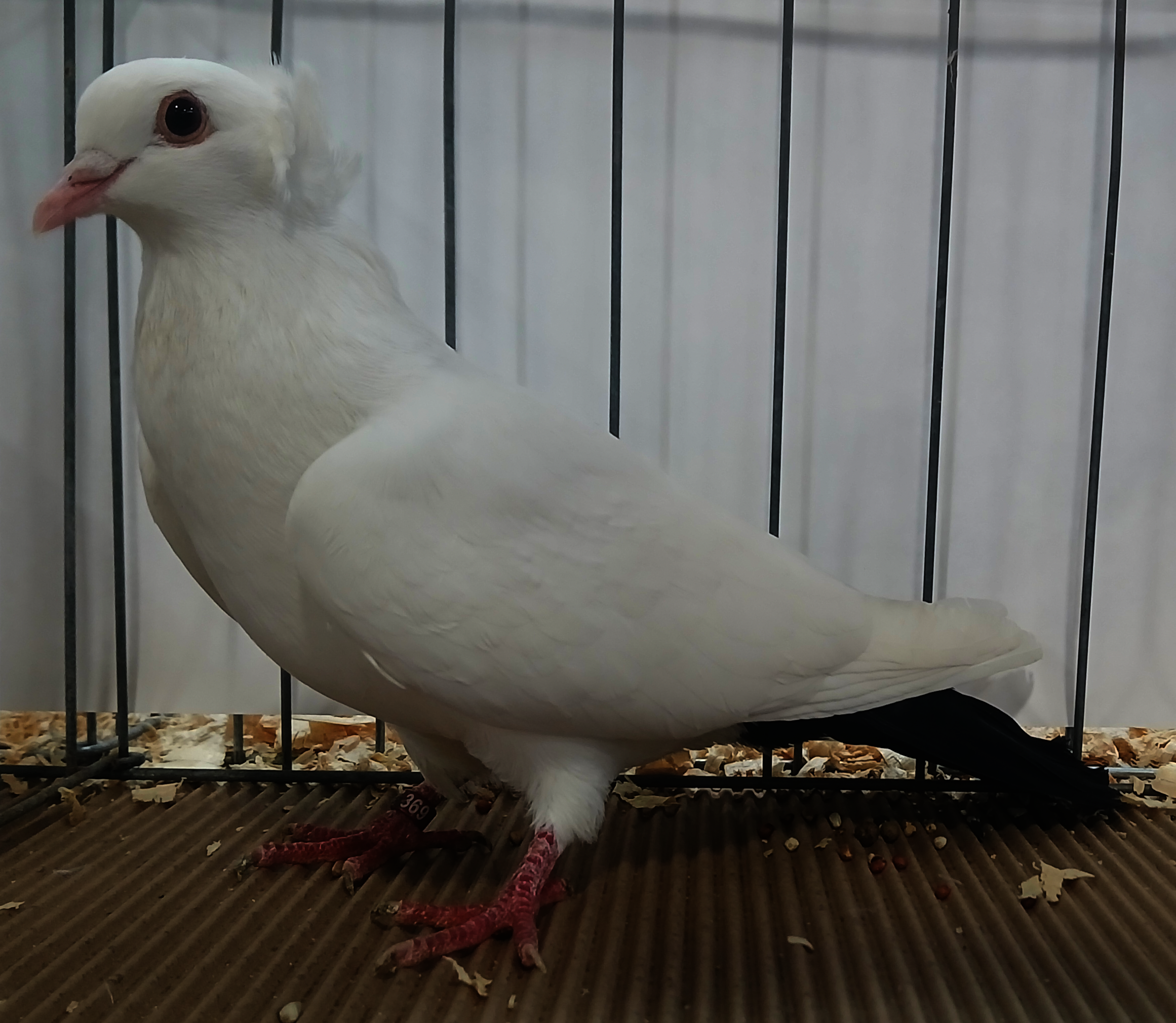
Black tail marked
- Barb = English Barb (GB/102)
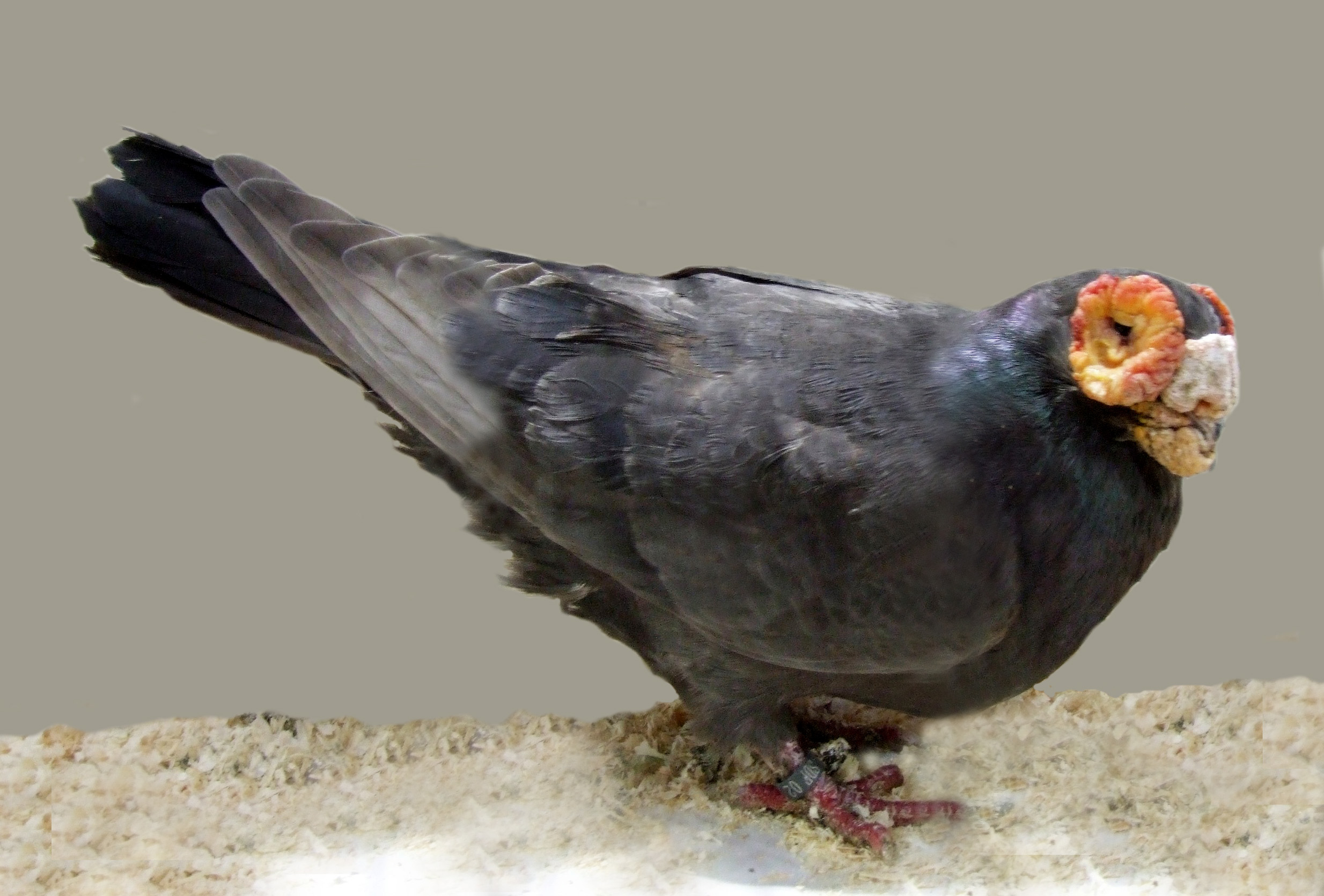
Black Barb
- Bango
- Barbarisi Owl pigeon (SYR^{(D)}/725)
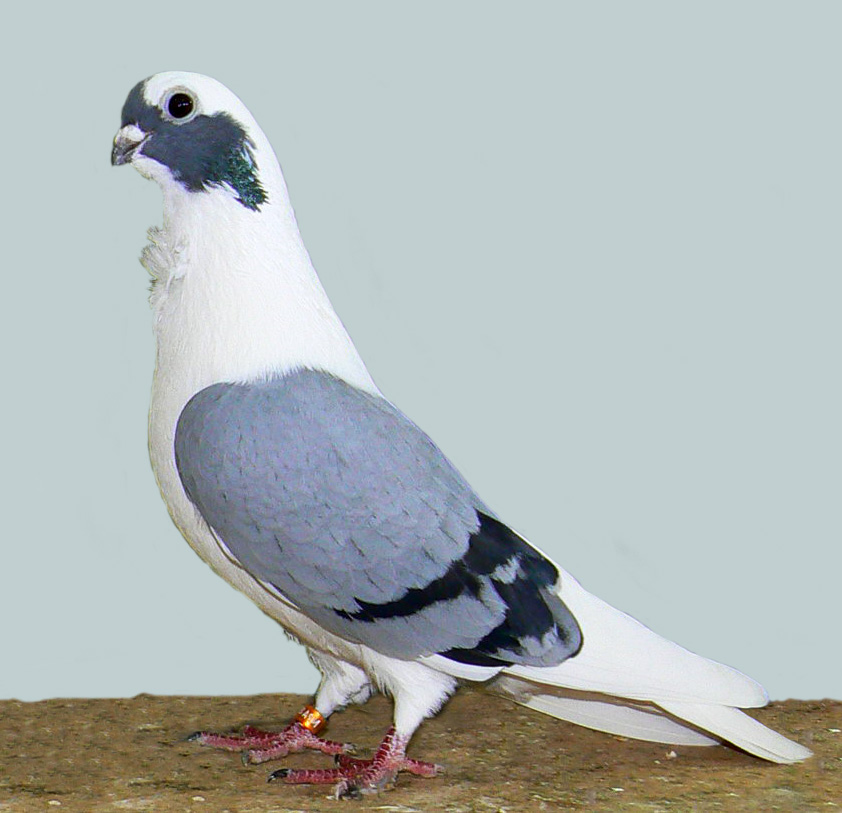
Barbarisi Owl blue bar

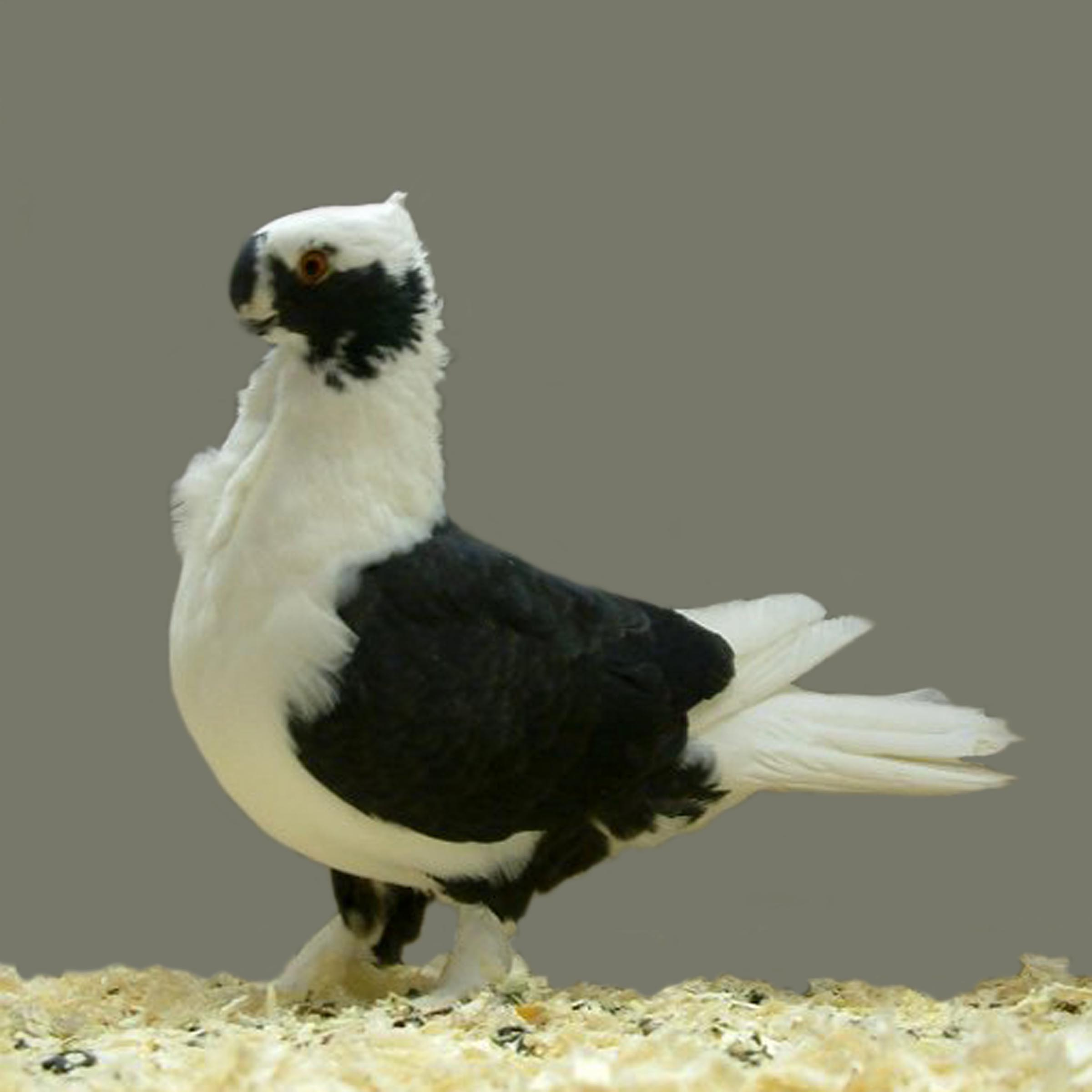
Barbarisi Owl black
- Barbet of Liège (B/723)
- Baska Tumbler
- Basra Dewlap (F/041)
- Bavarian Cropper (D/315)
- Bavarian Highflyer (D/984)
- Beak-crested Jacobin
- Beauty Homer de Lige (B/035)
- Belgian Beauty Homer (B/034)
- Belgian Highflyer (B/876)
- Belgian Tumbler (B/882)
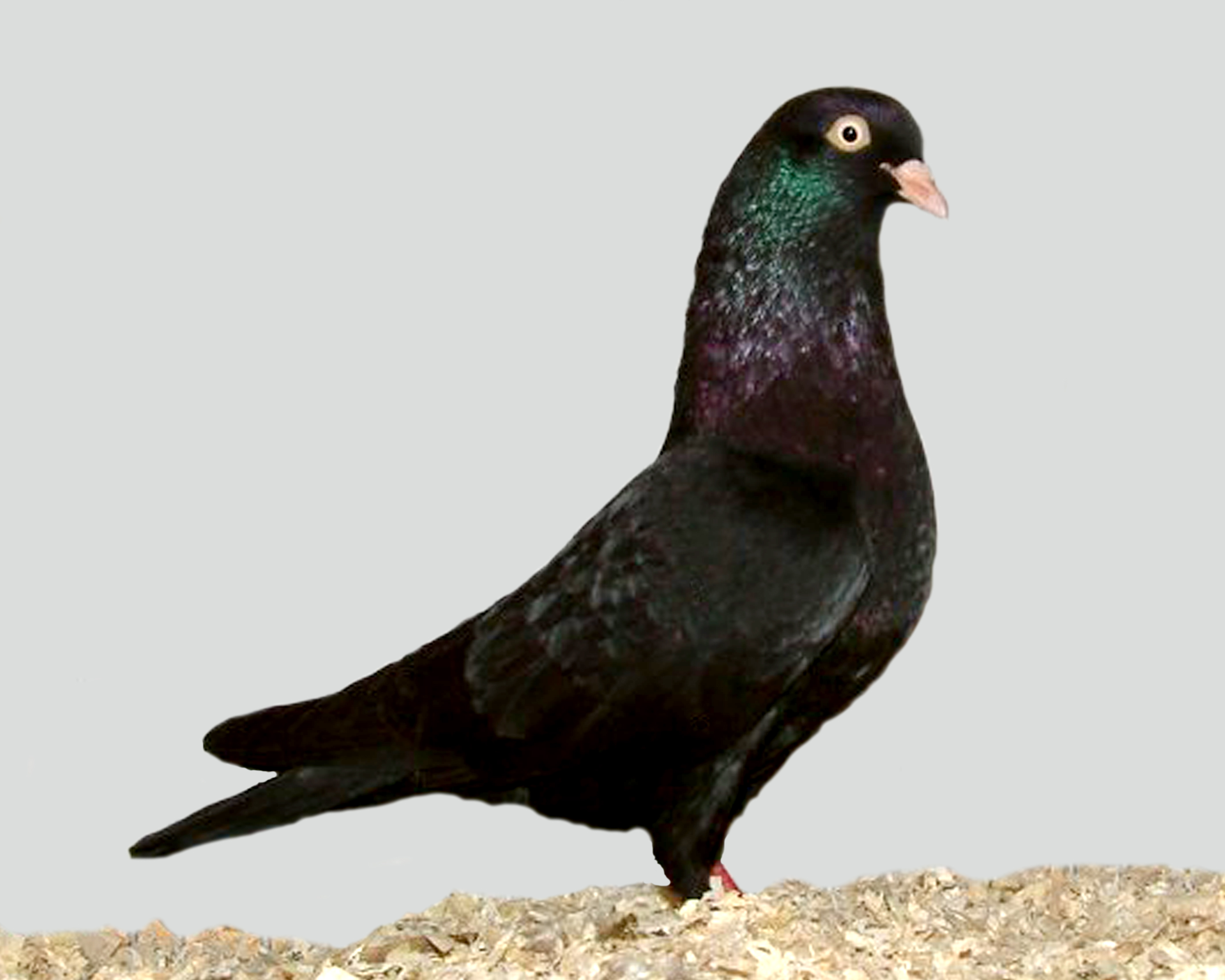
Belgian Tumbler black
- Belgian Ringbeater (B/1102)
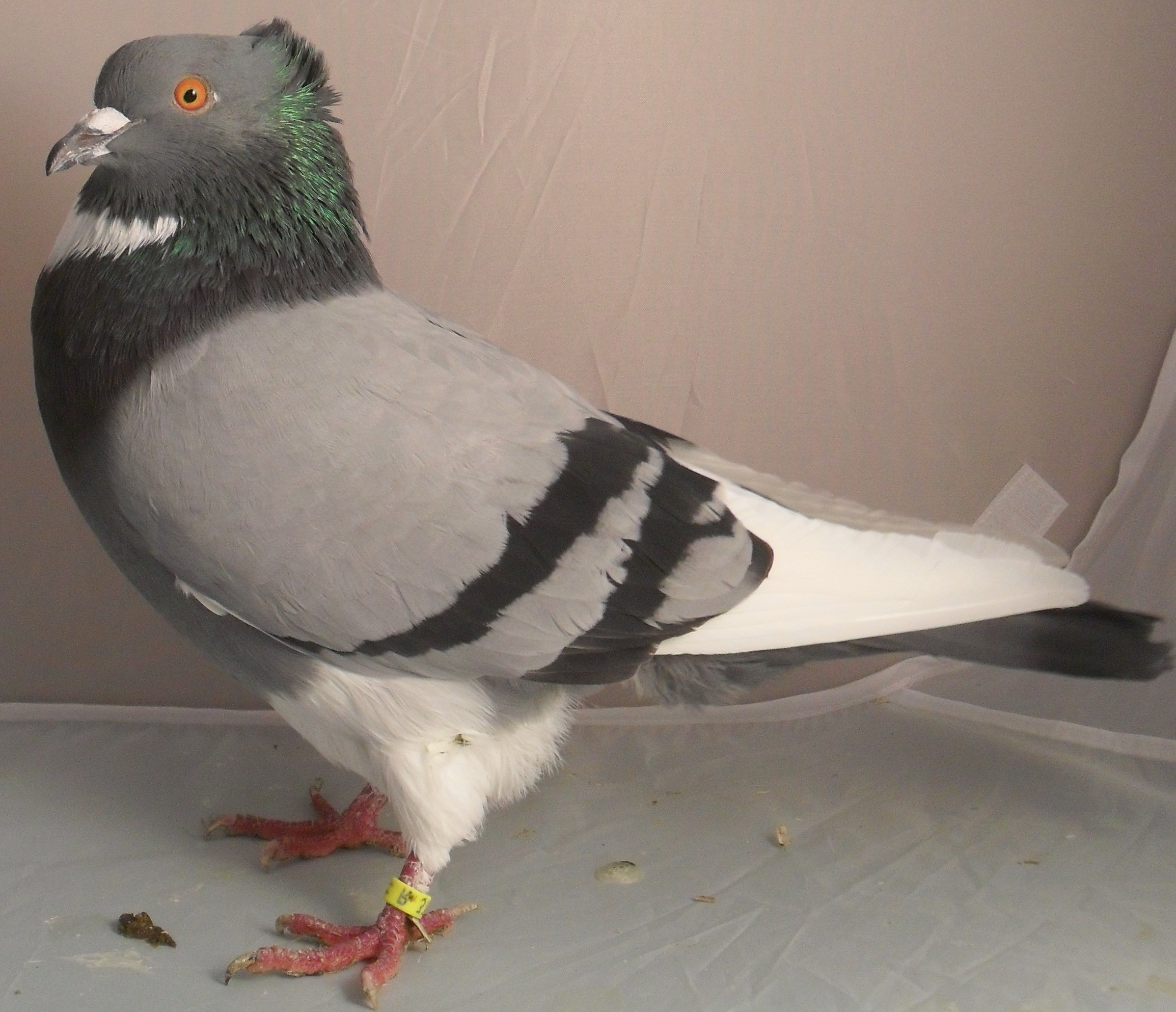
Ringbeater Blue bar

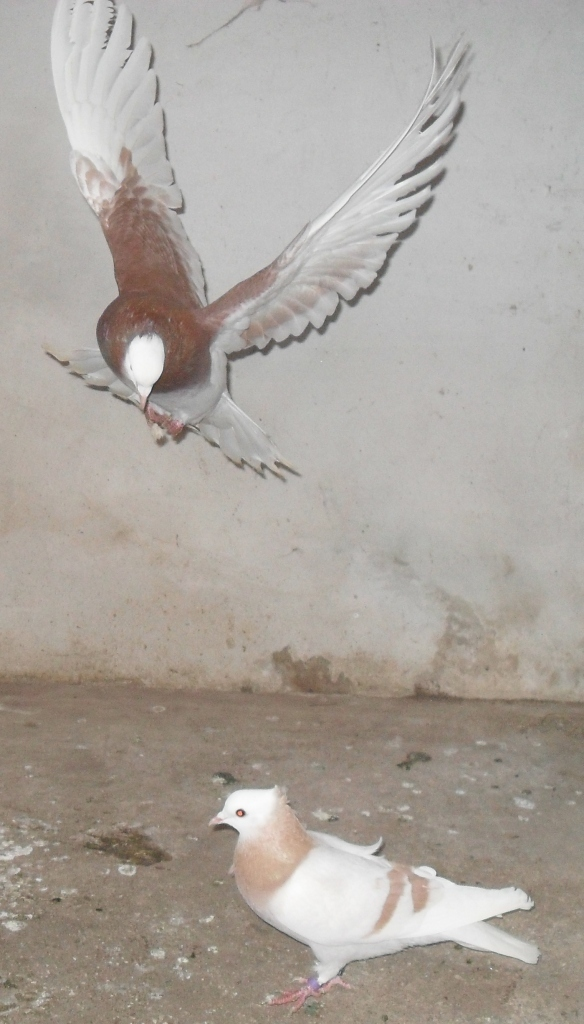
Circle flaying
- Benesov Pigeon (CZ/054)
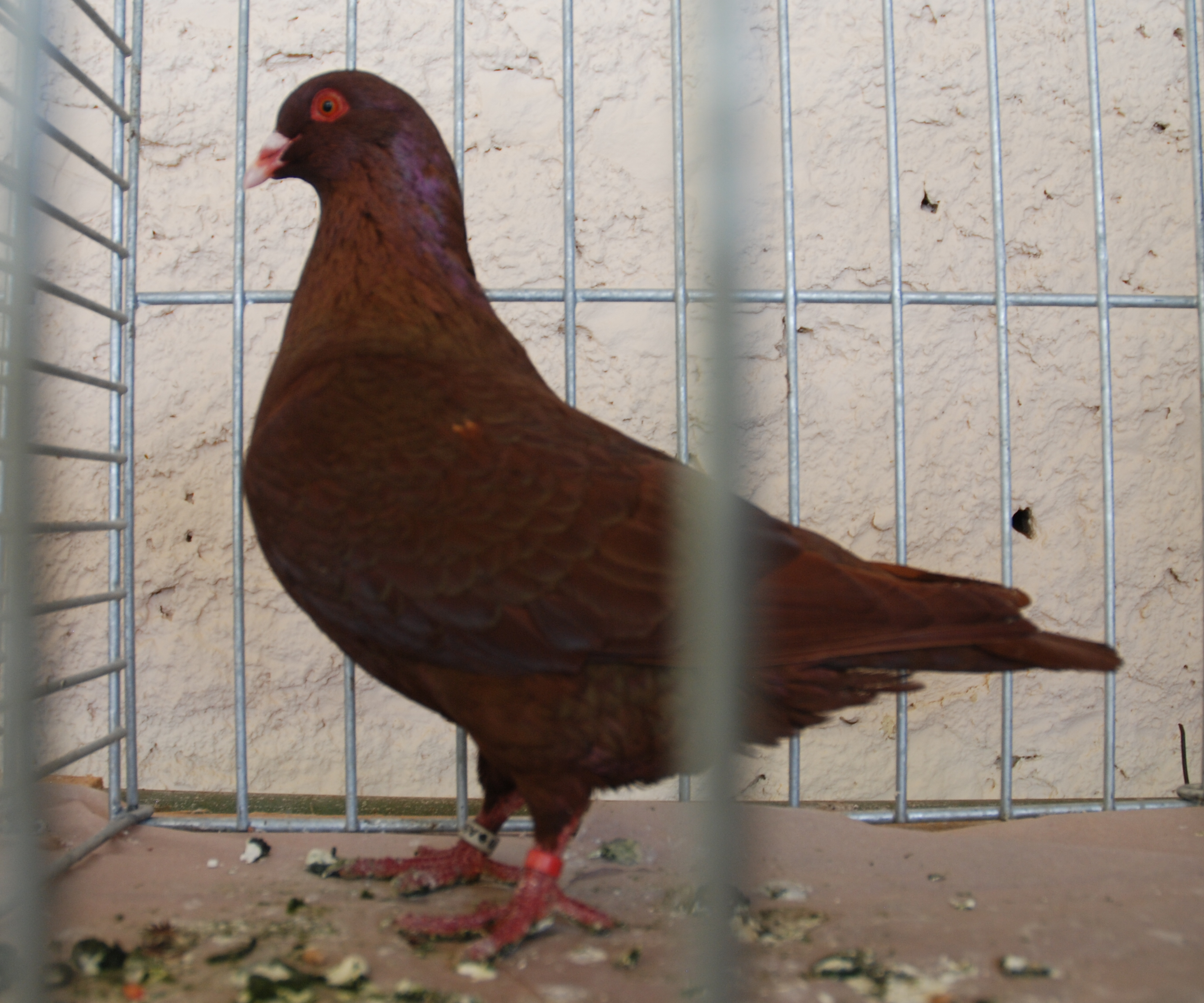
Red Benesov
- Bergamasco (I/059)
- Bergen Tumbler (N/879)
- Berlin Long-faced Tumbler (D/805)
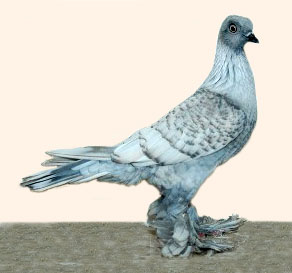
Berlin Long-faced Tumbler
- Berlin Medium-faced Tumbler
- Berlin Muffed Tumbler (D/806)
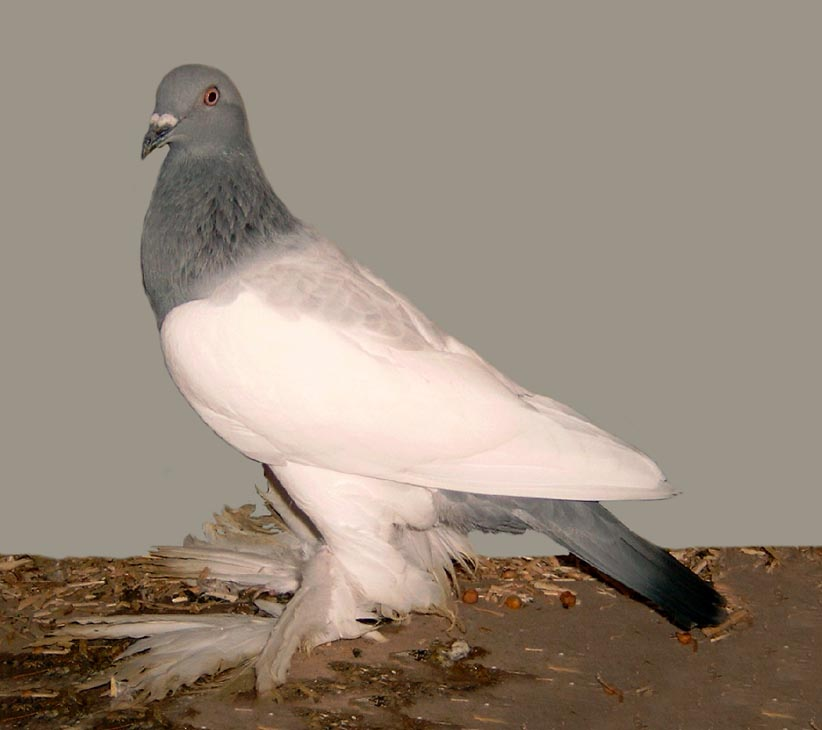
Magpie marked, muffed Berlin Long faced
- Berlin Short-faced Tumbler (D/904)
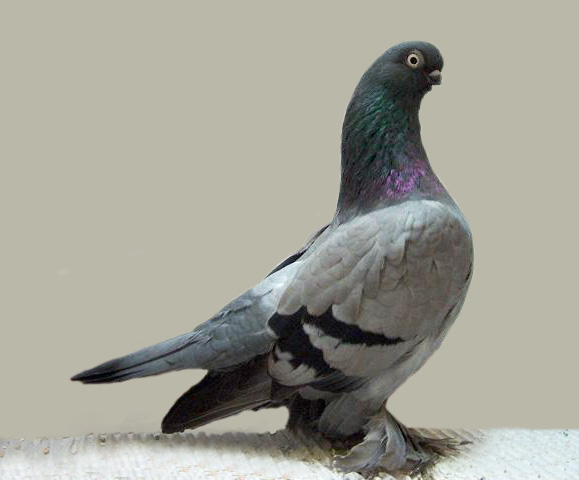
Short faced Berlin Tumbler
- Bernburg Trumpeter (D/504)
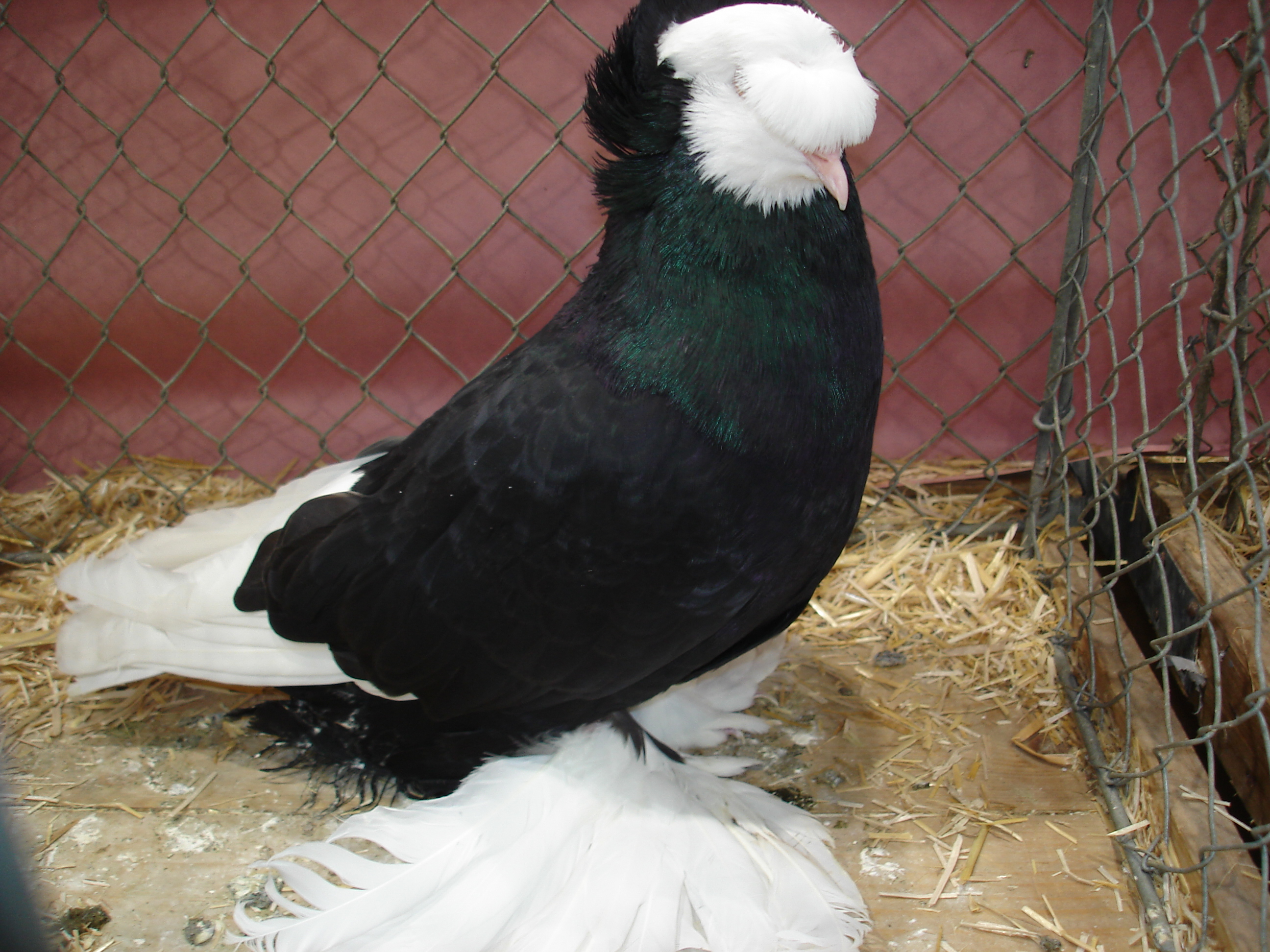
Black Bernburg
- Berne Gugger (CH/411)
- Berne Half-beak (CH/483)
- Berne Lark pigeon (CH/412)
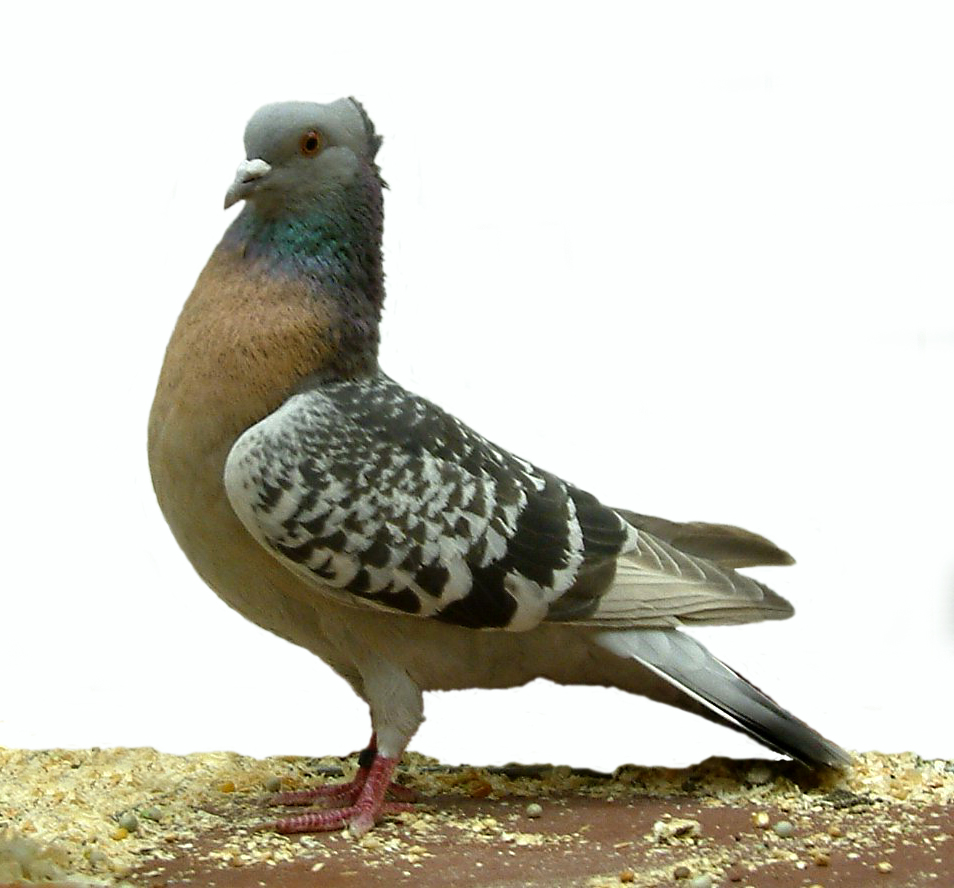
Check Berne Lark
- Berne Peak-crested
- Berne Ribbon-tail (CH/414)
- Berne Tiger-head (CH/413)
- Berne White-tail (CH/415)
- Bernhardin Magpie pigeon (D/446)
- Bialostocka Krymka Tumbler (PL/935)
- Bihac Roller (BiH/1007)
- Bijeljina Roller (BiH/1008)
- Birmingham Roller (GB/918)
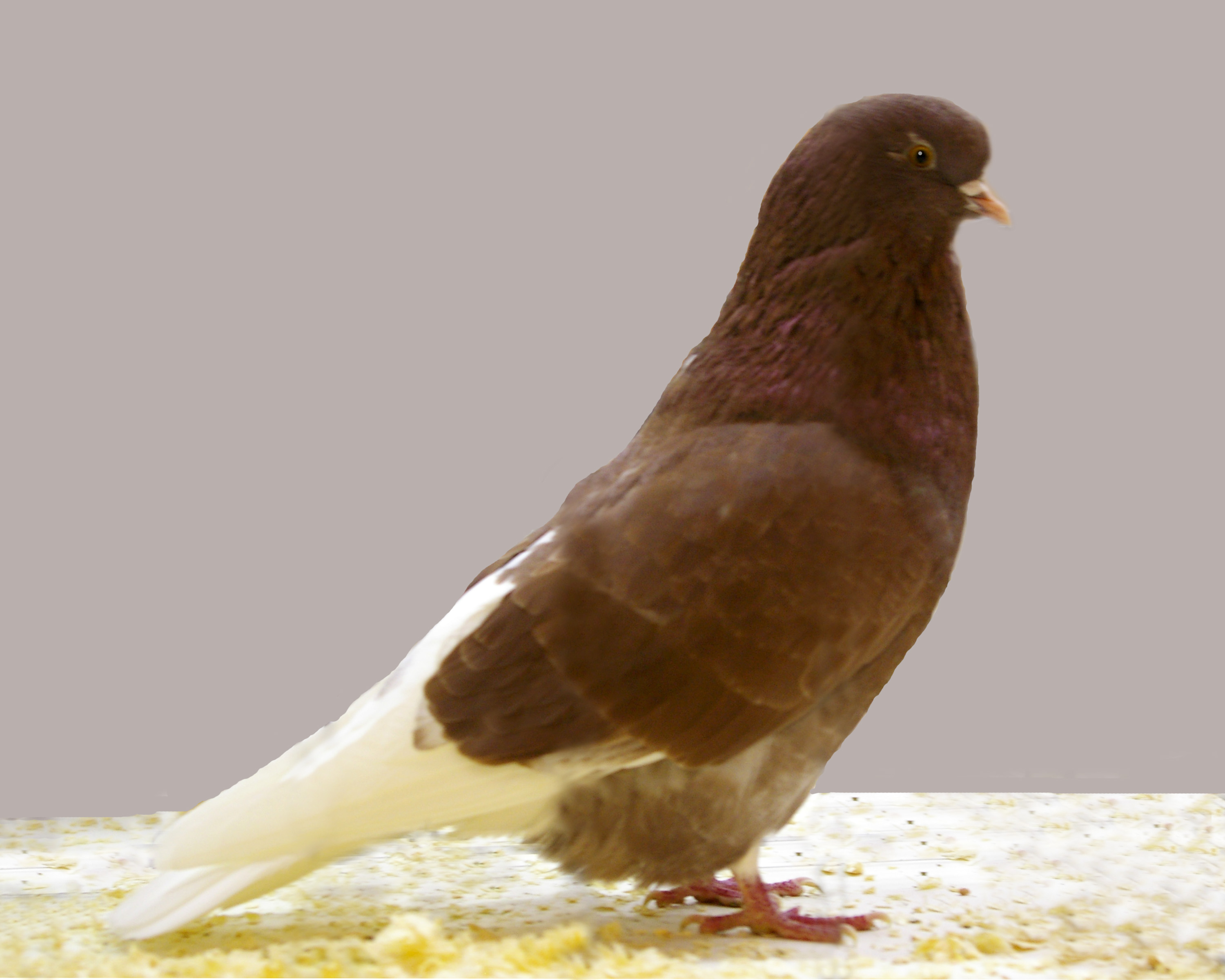
Red Birmingham Roller
- Blagodar Tumbler (RUS^{(D)}/970)
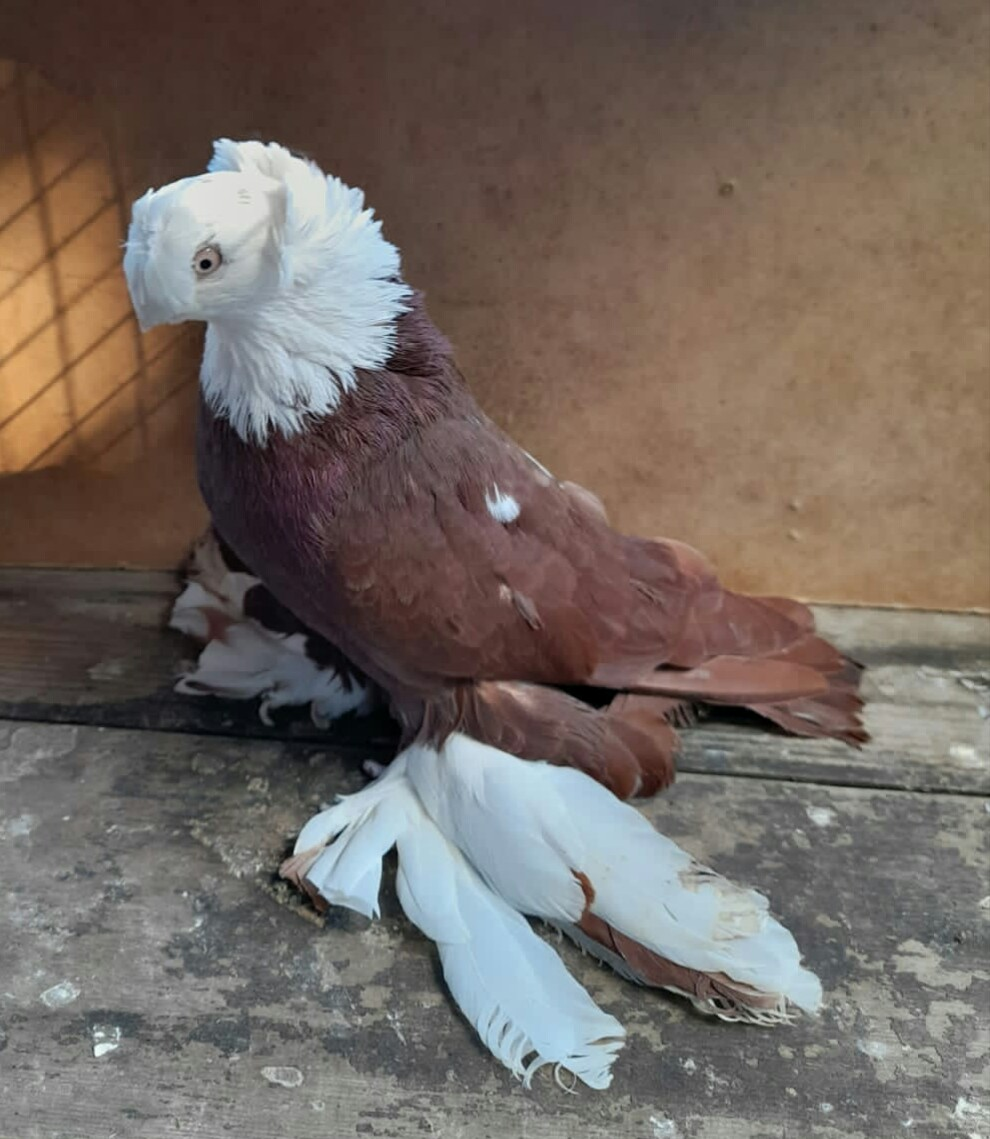
Red Blagodar

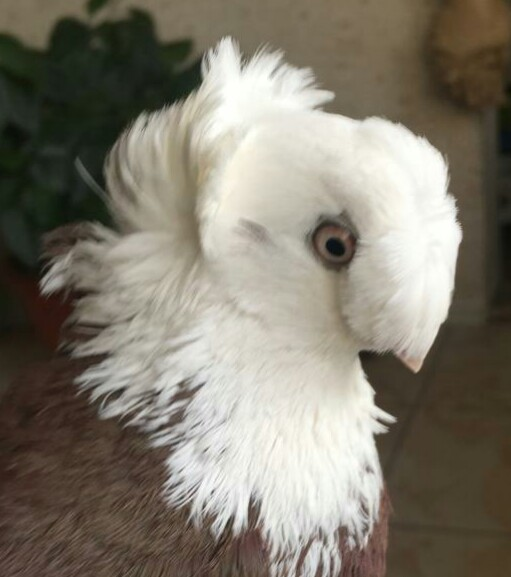
Blagodar Head
- Blue Sovater (H/061)
- Blue Tumbler of Cluj (= Cluj-Napoca Blue (RO/975))
- Bohemian Bagdad (CZ/110)
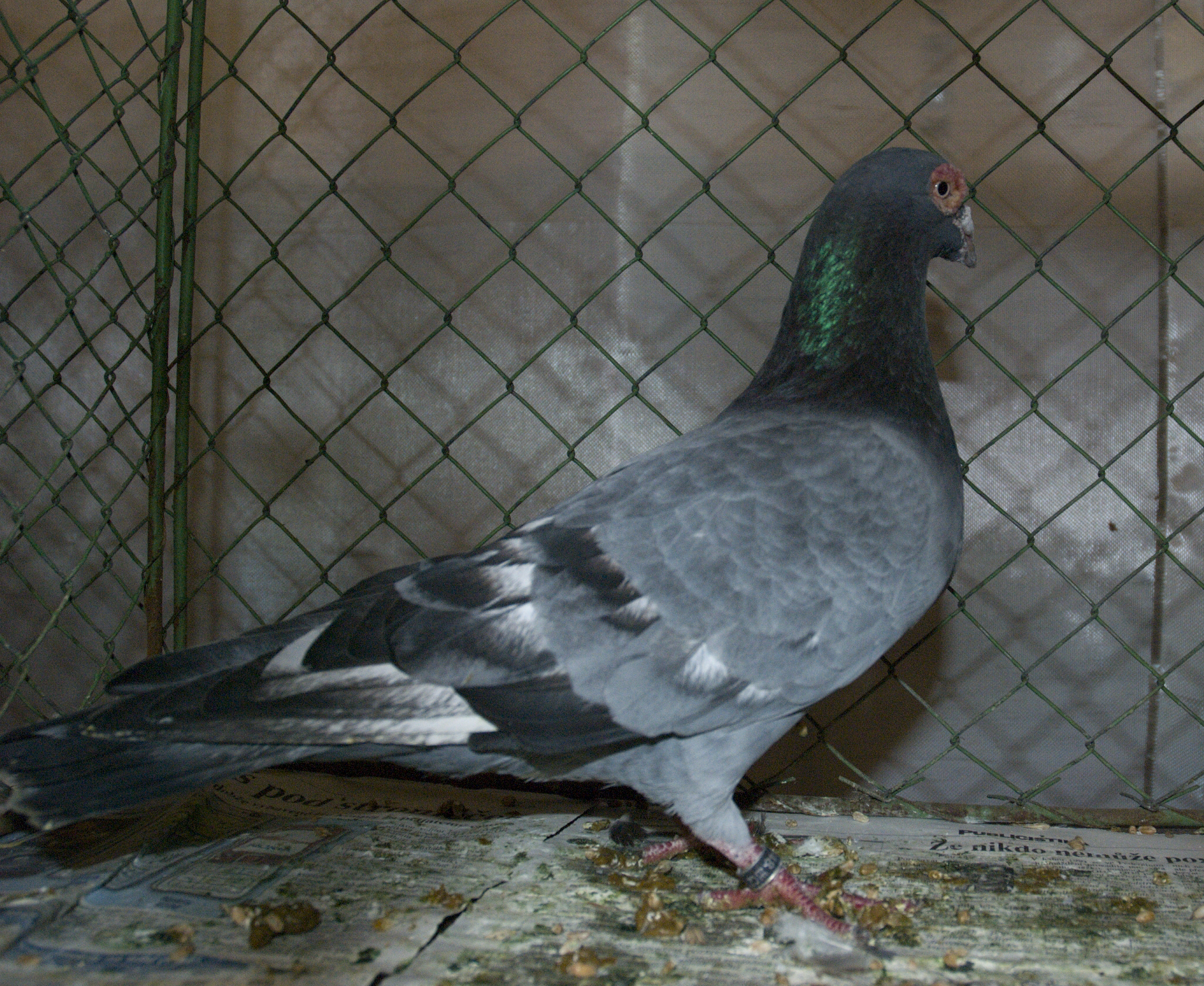
Bohemian Bagdad

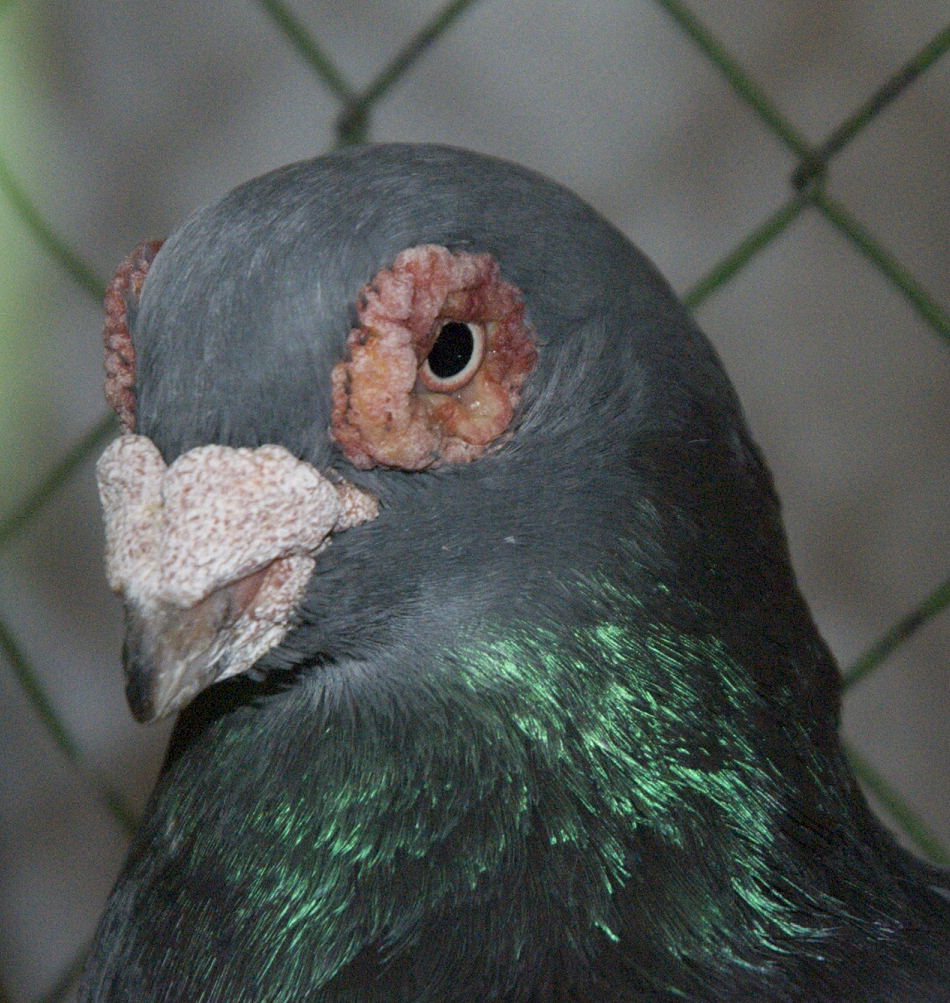
Bohemian Bagdad head
- Bohemian Cropper (CZ/321)
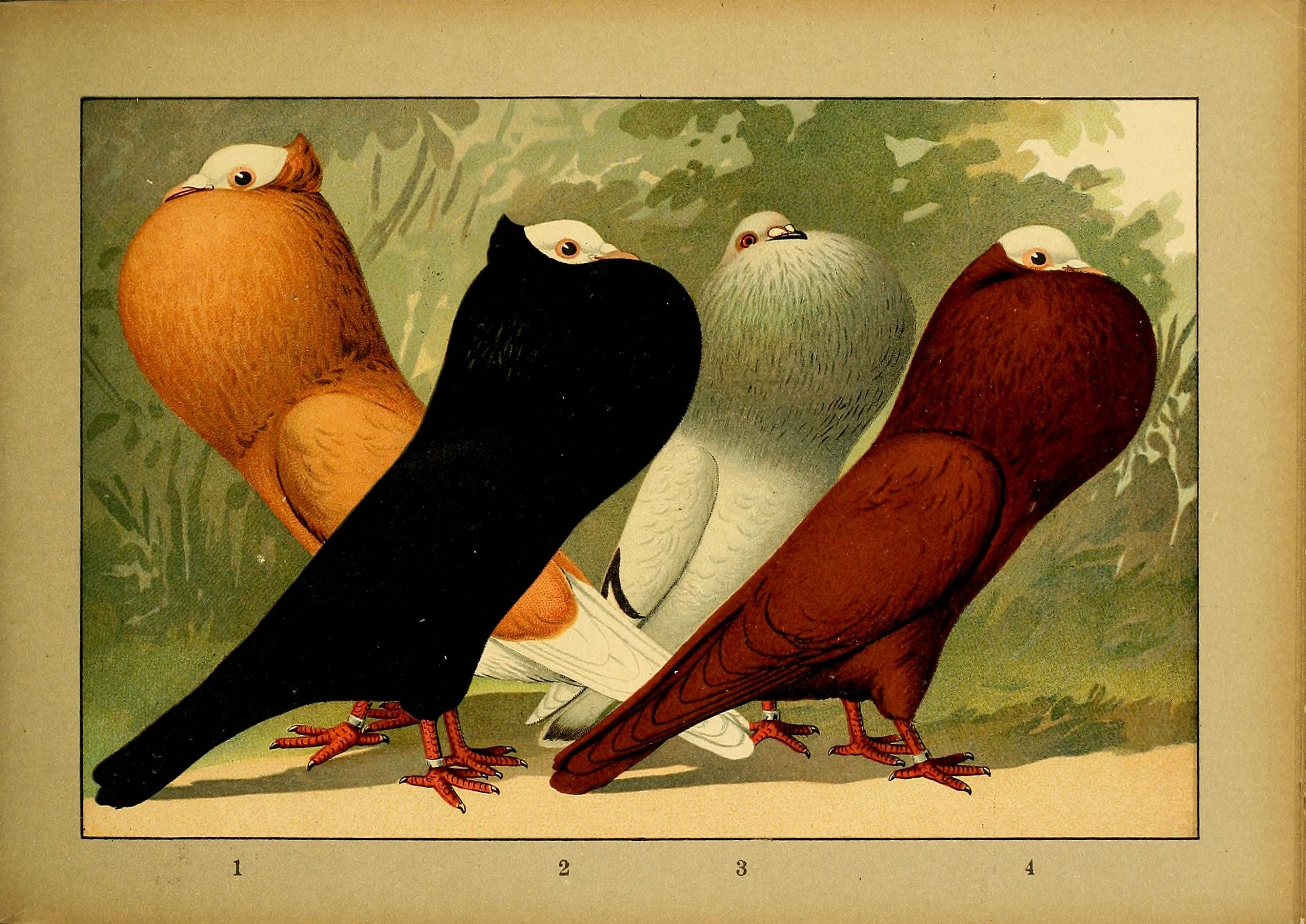
Schachtzabel 1906 Tafel 57
- Bohemian Fairy Swallow pigeon
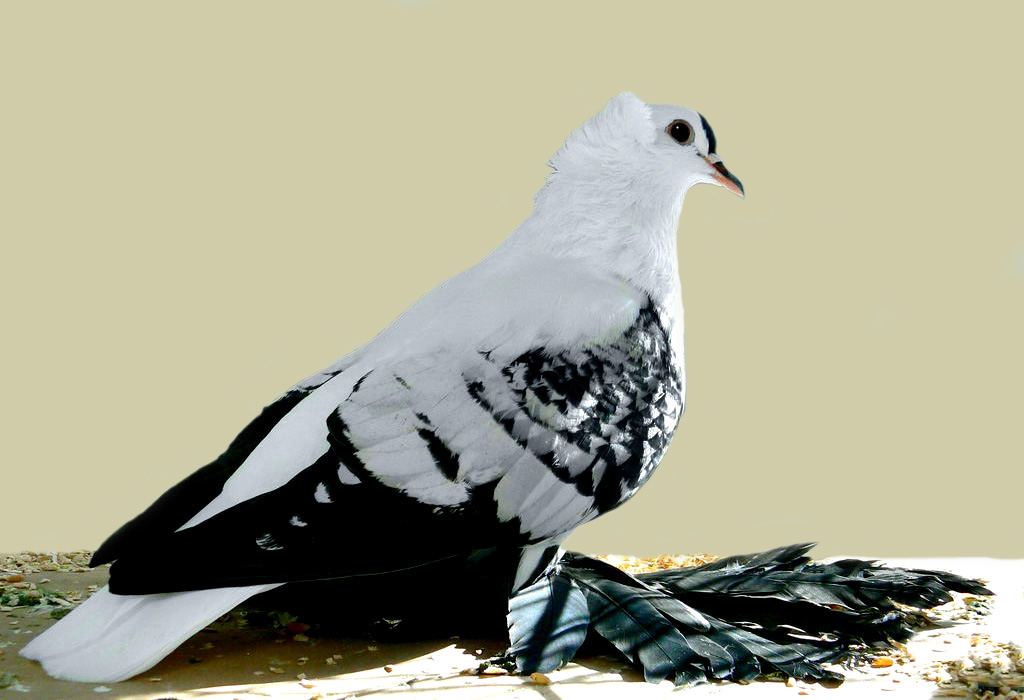
Bohemian Fairy Swallow Black tigered
- Bohemian Ice Cropper (CZ/325)
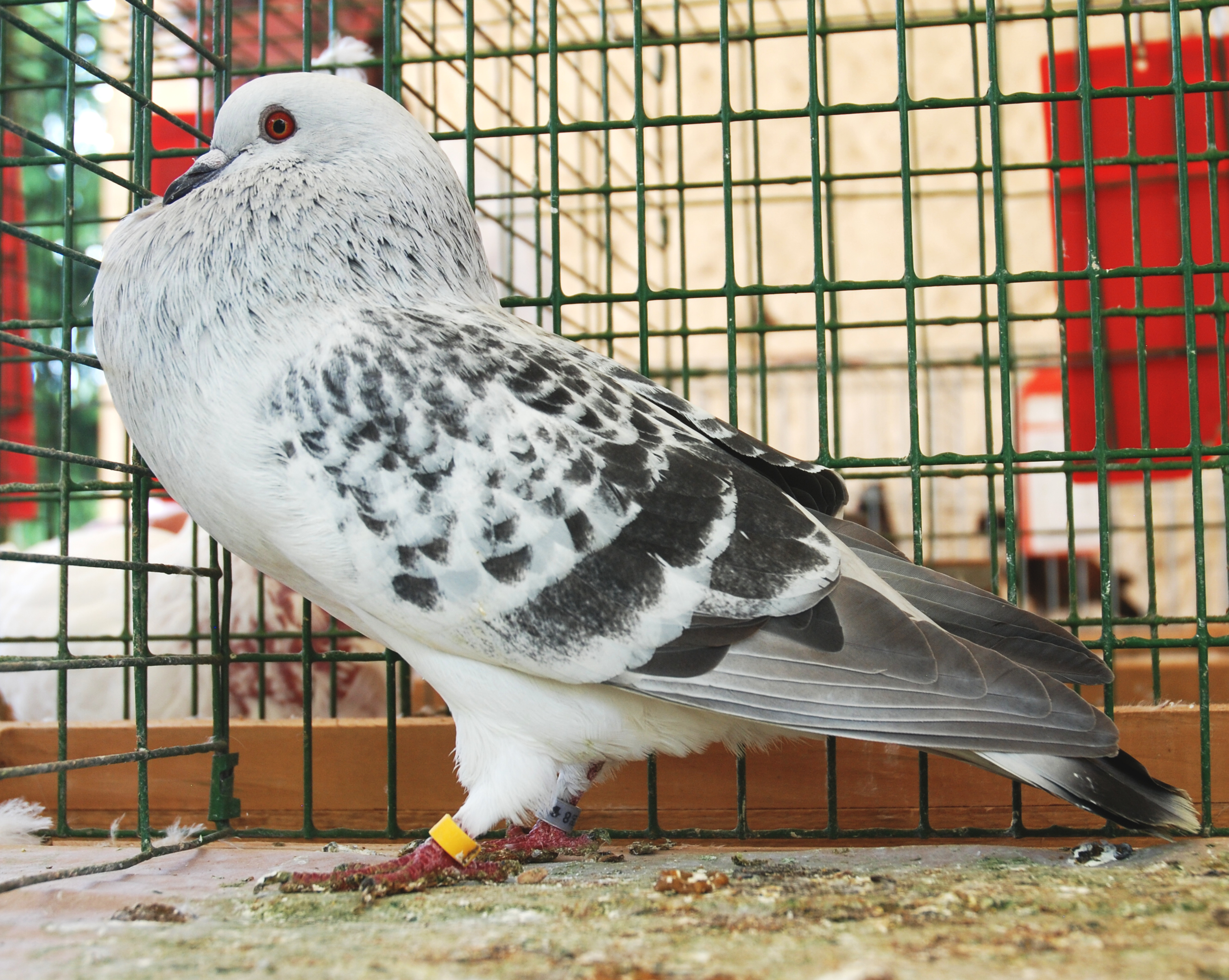
Bohemian Cropper Ice Chequered
- Bohemian Pigeon (D/401)
- Bohemian Steller Cropper (CZ/345)
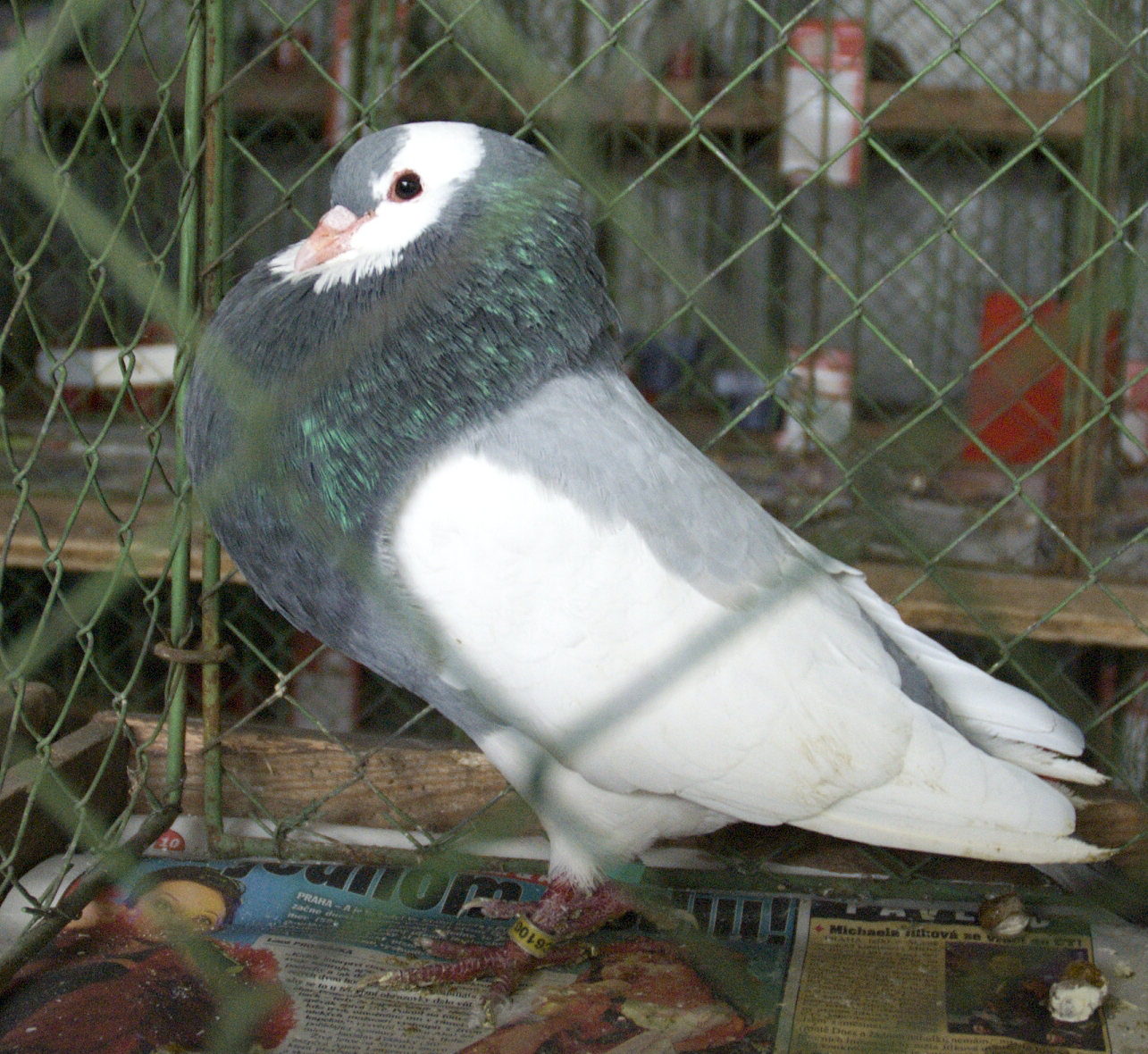
Bohemian Steller Cropper
- Bohemian Tiger Swallow pigeon, clean-legged (CZ/478) and muffed (CZ/477)
- Bohemian Trumpeter (CZ/516)
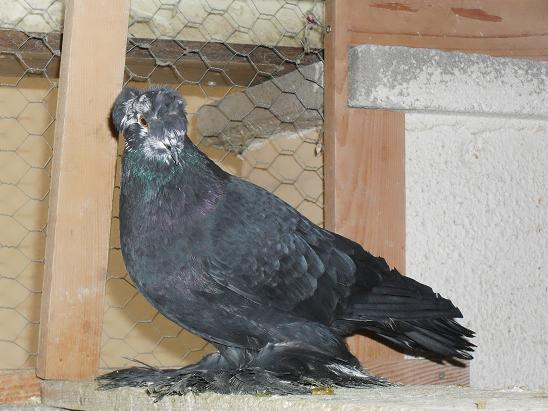
Český bublák
- Bohemian Tumbler (CZ/967)
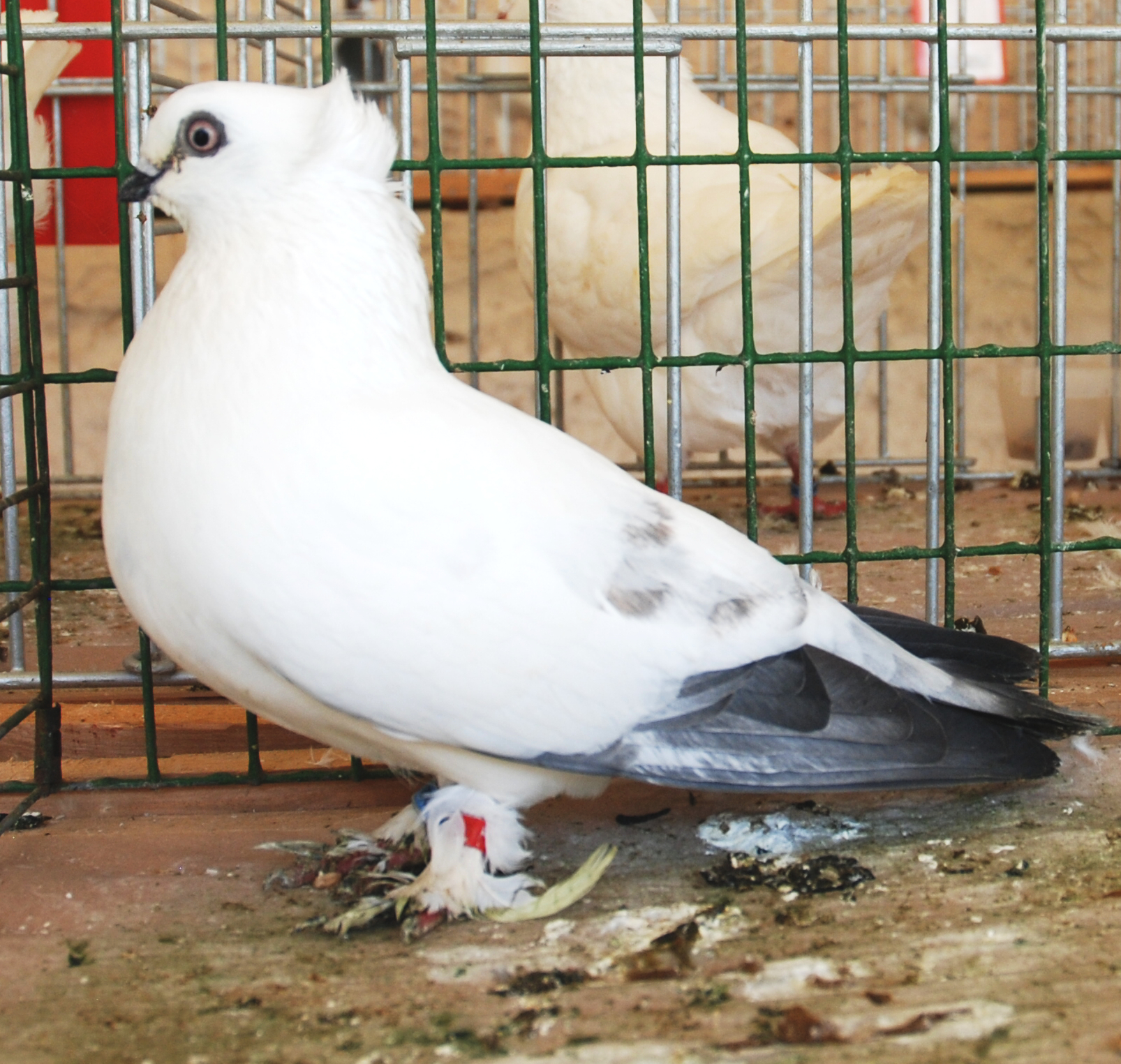
Bohemian Tumbler
- Bokhara Trumpeter (GB/501)
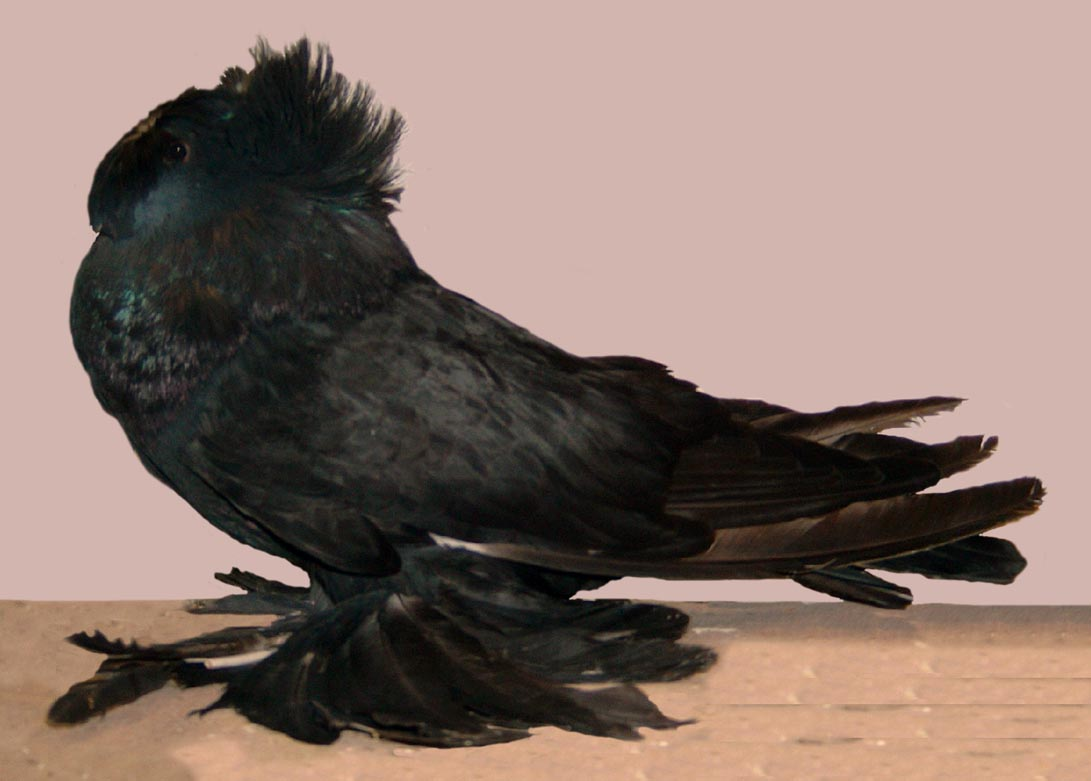
Black Bokhara Trumpeter

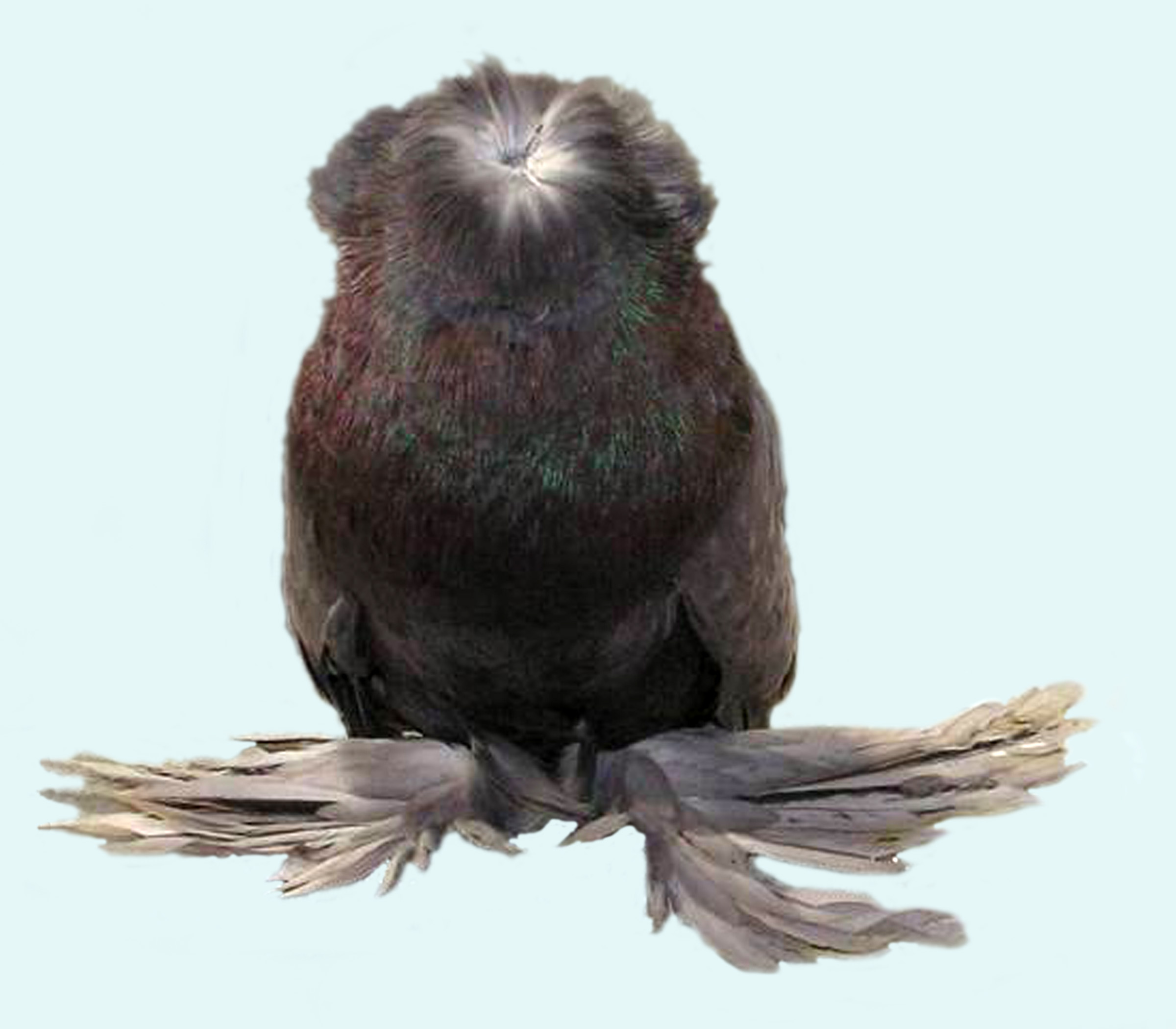
Red Bokhara Trumpeter
- Bokhara Tumbler
- Borino (E/927)
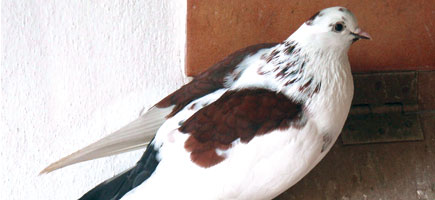
Colom Borino
- Botoșani Tumbler (RO/952)
- Bremen Tumbler (D/814)
- Breslau Tumbler (D/911)
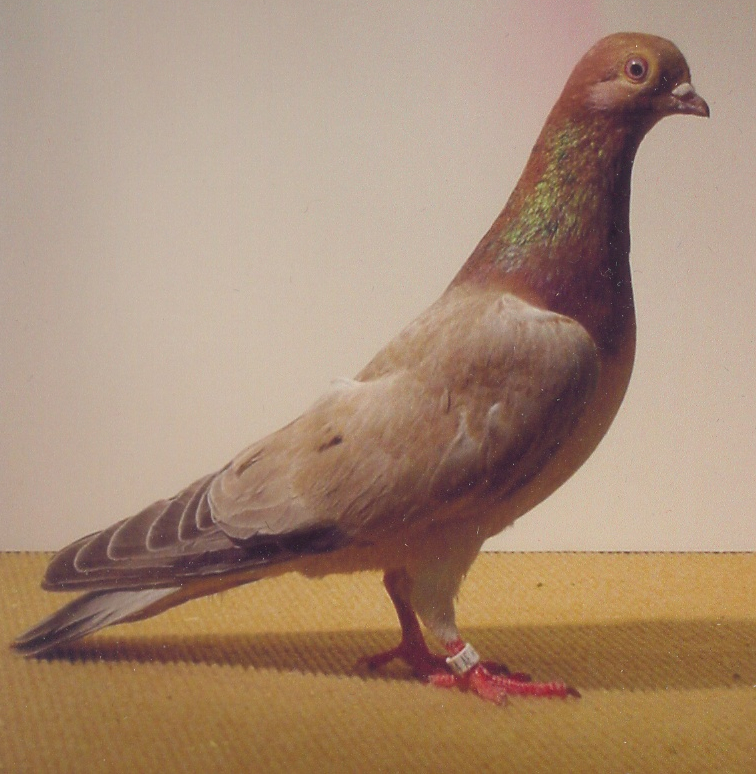
Brown Breslau

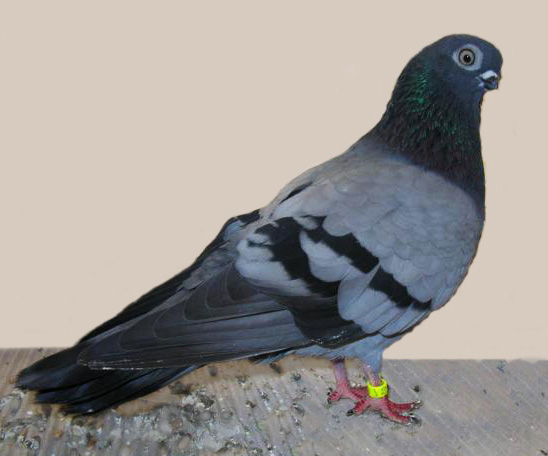
Blue Bar Breslau
- British Show Racer
- Briver Black-head (F/047)
- Brod Tumbler (HR^{(D)}/950)
- Brunner Pouter (CZ/330)
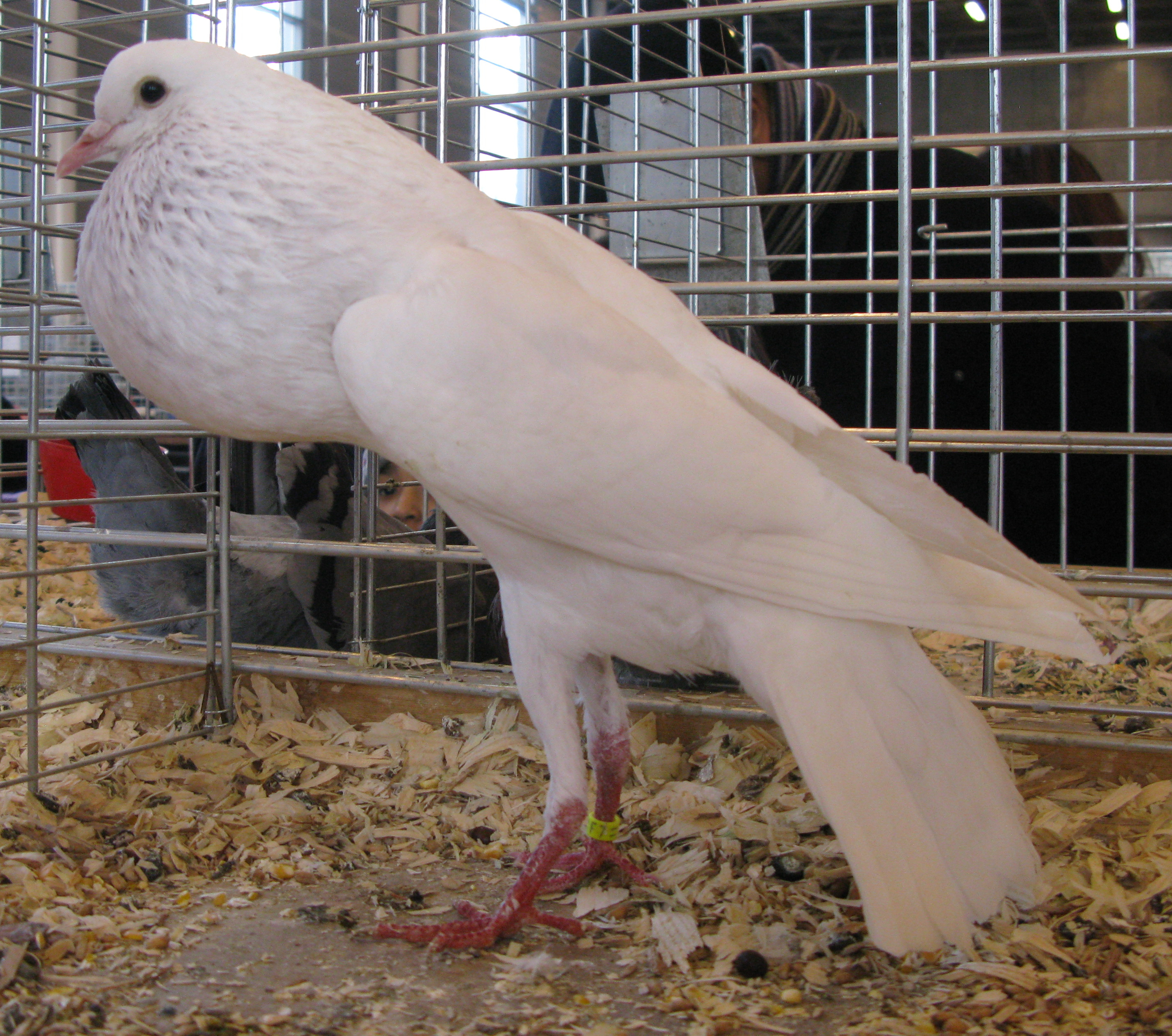
Brunner Pouter, White
- Bucharest Ciung Highflier
- Bucharest Show Tumbler
- Buda Grizzle Budapest Short-faced Tumbler
- Budapest Coloured (H/847) (= Budapest Highflyer)
- Budapest Highflier (Poltli)
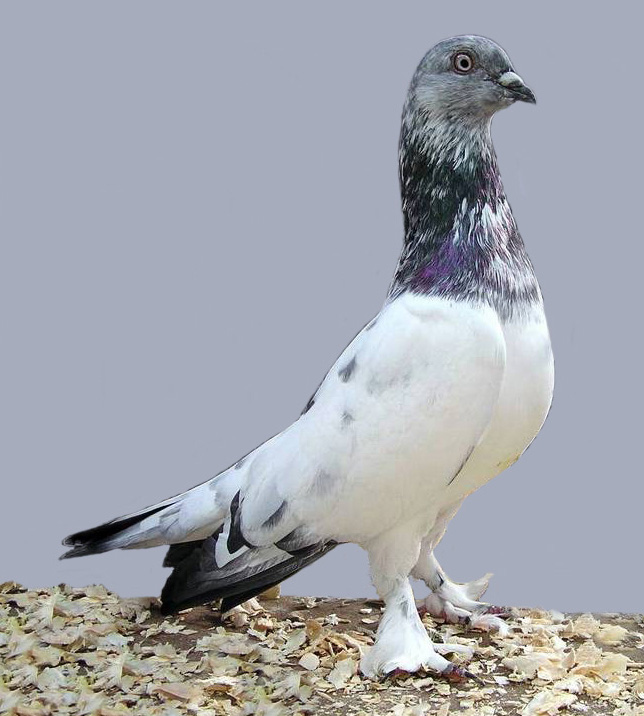
Budapest Highflier
- Budapest Kiebitz (H/846)
- Budapest Muffed Tumbler
- Budapest Short-beak (H/844) (= Budapest Short-faced Tumbler)
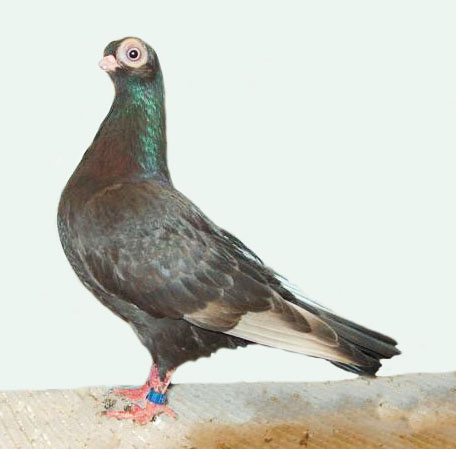
Budapest Short Faced Tumbler

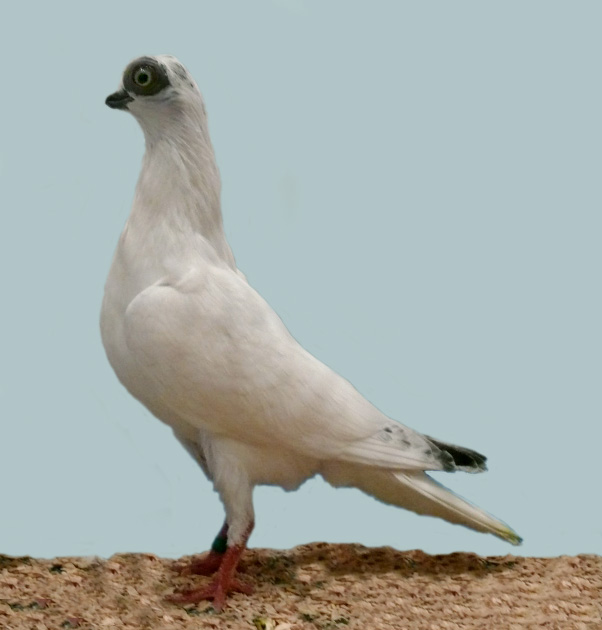
Budapest Short Faced Tumbler
- Budapest Tumbler, stork-marked muffed (H/955)
- Budapest Whiteflight Highflyer (H/845)
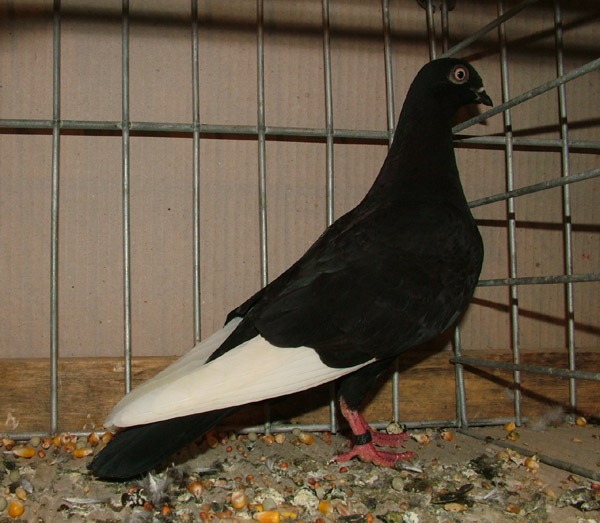

Budapest Whiteflight Highflyer

- Budapest Whiteside (H/843)
- Buga Pigeon (H/062)
- Bukarest black Hanging Flight Tumbler (RO/972)
- Bulgarian Shield Owl pigeon (BG^{(B)}/727)
- Bulgarian White Shield Roller (BG/986)
- Bursa Tumbler (TR^{(D)}/894)
- Bácka Long-beak Tumbler (SRB^{(D)}/859) (= Sombor)

== C ==
- Cakal Roller (TR^{(D)}/895)
- Cambalhota Português
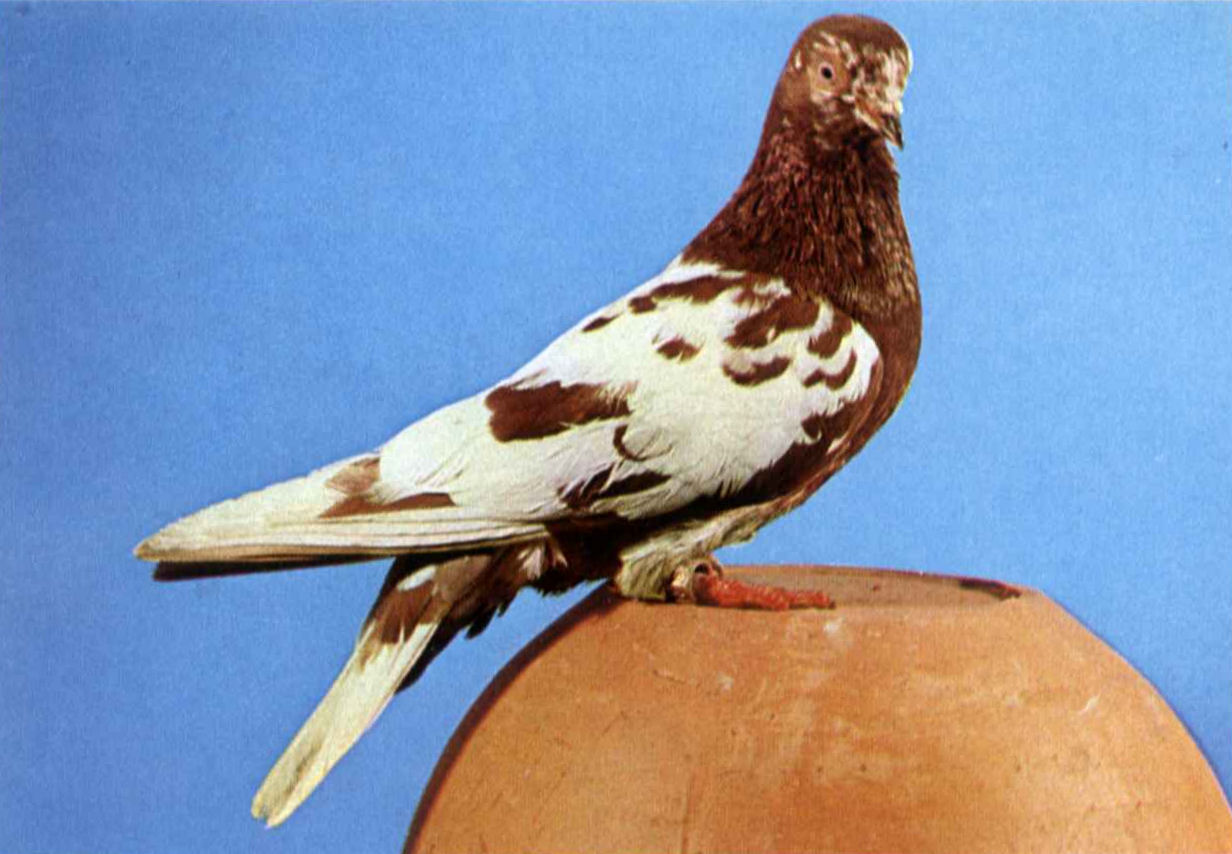
Cambalhota Português

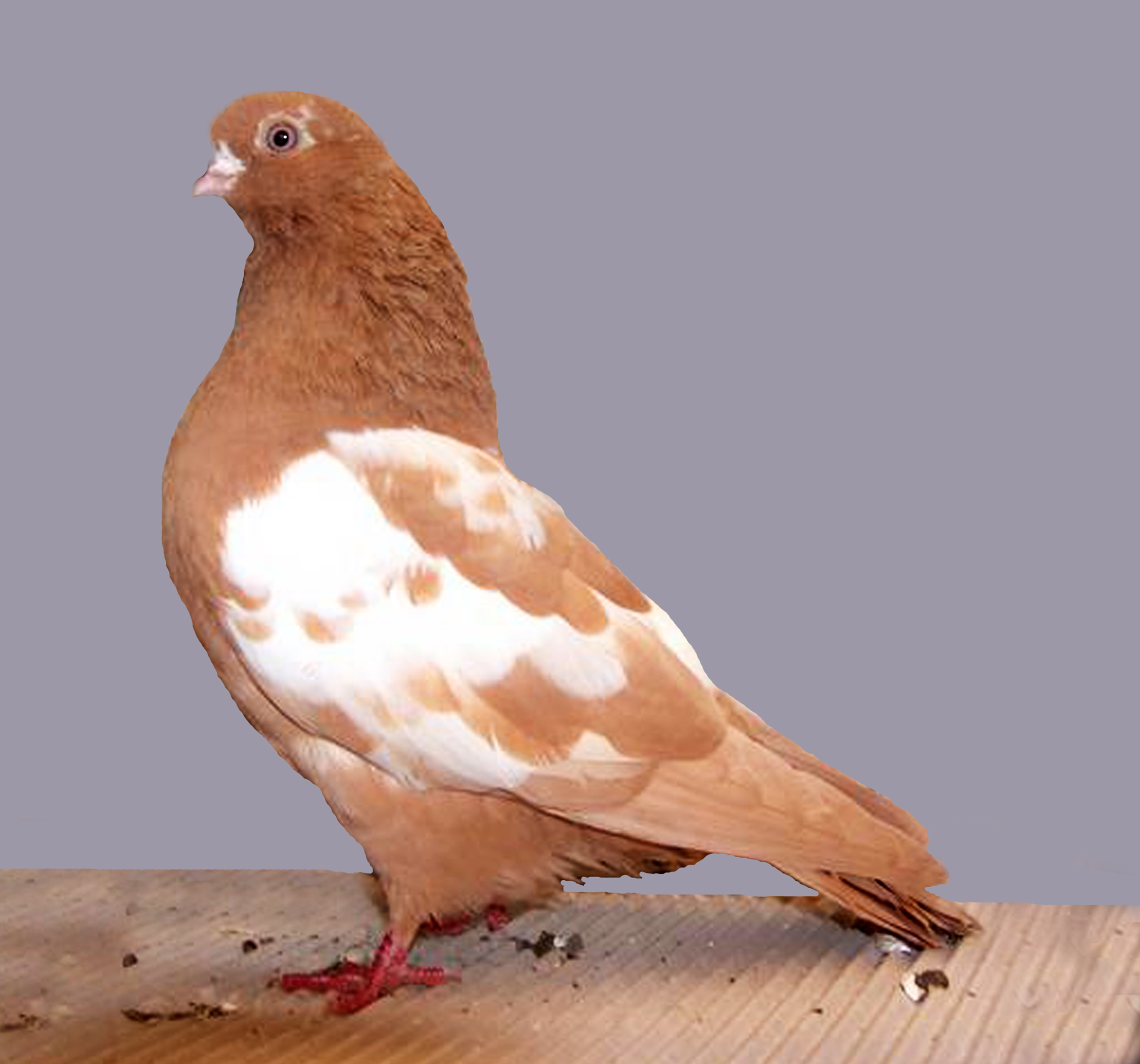
Cambalhota Português Yellow
- Campagnolo Sammarinese® (RSM – registered breed)
- Canario Cropper (E/344)
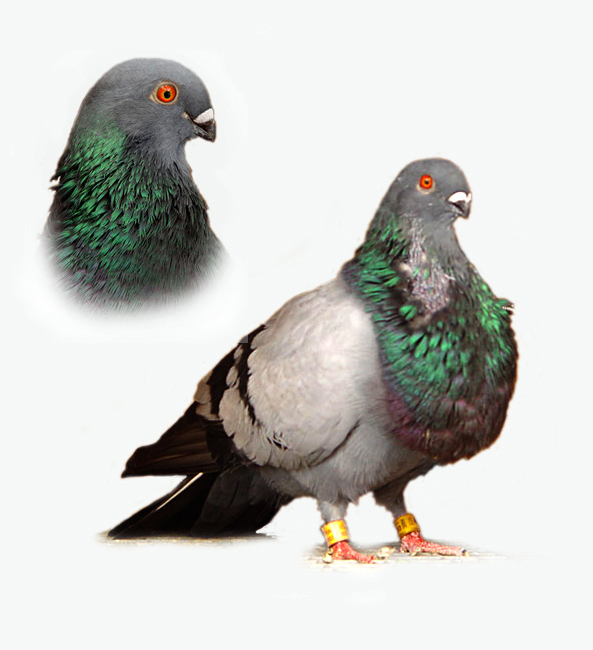
Blue bar Canaria Cropper
- Carneau (F/007)
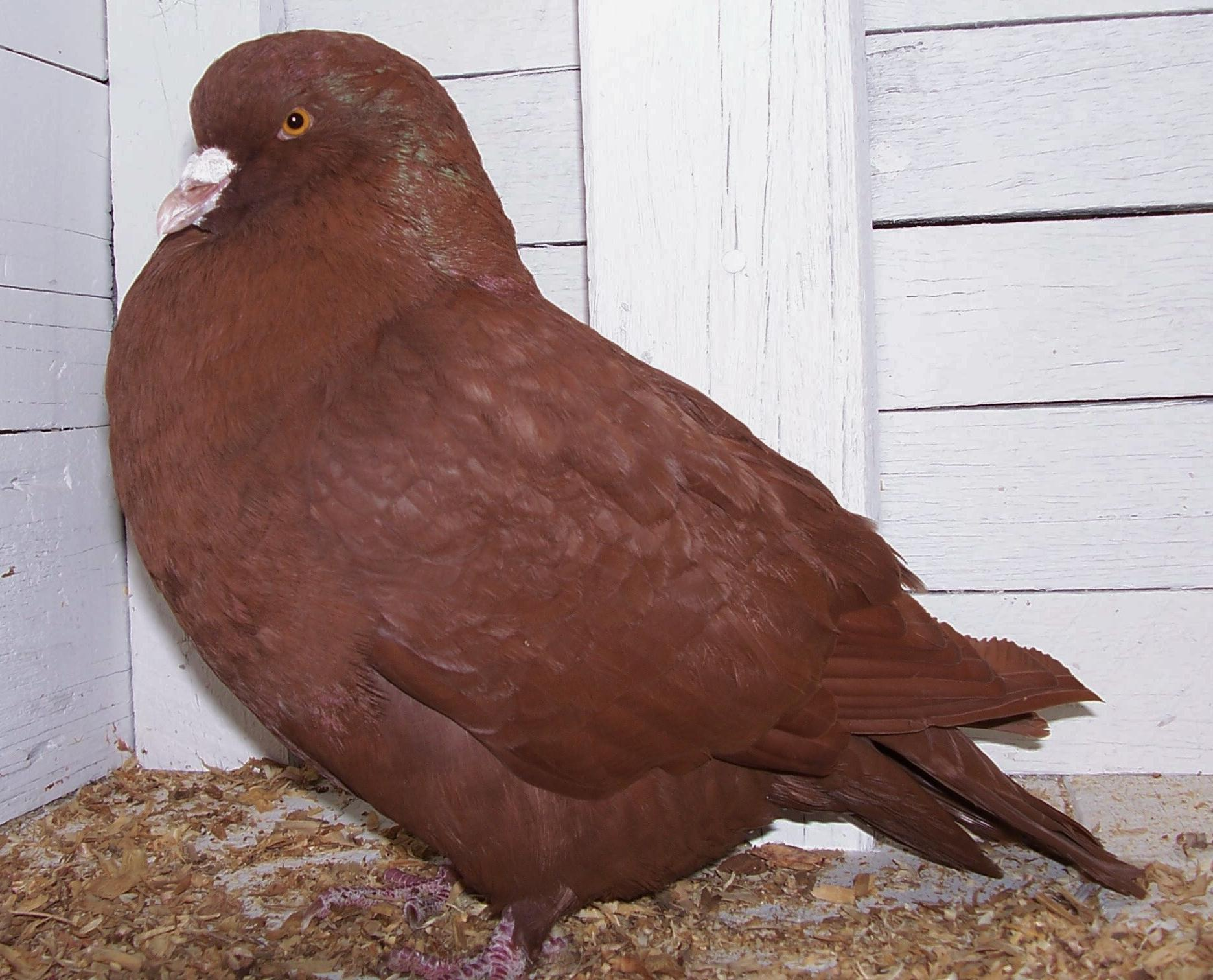
Red Carneau

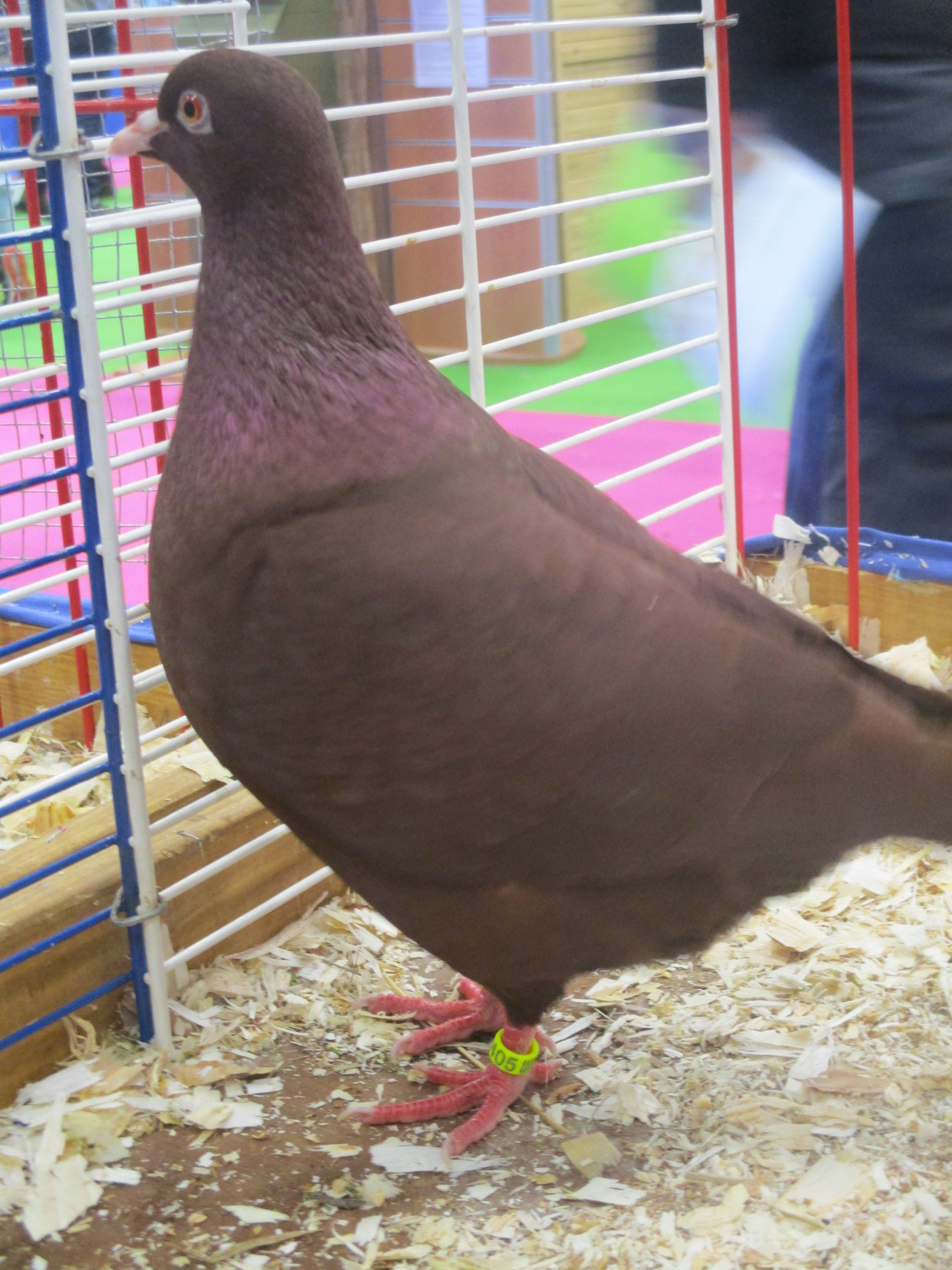
Carneau

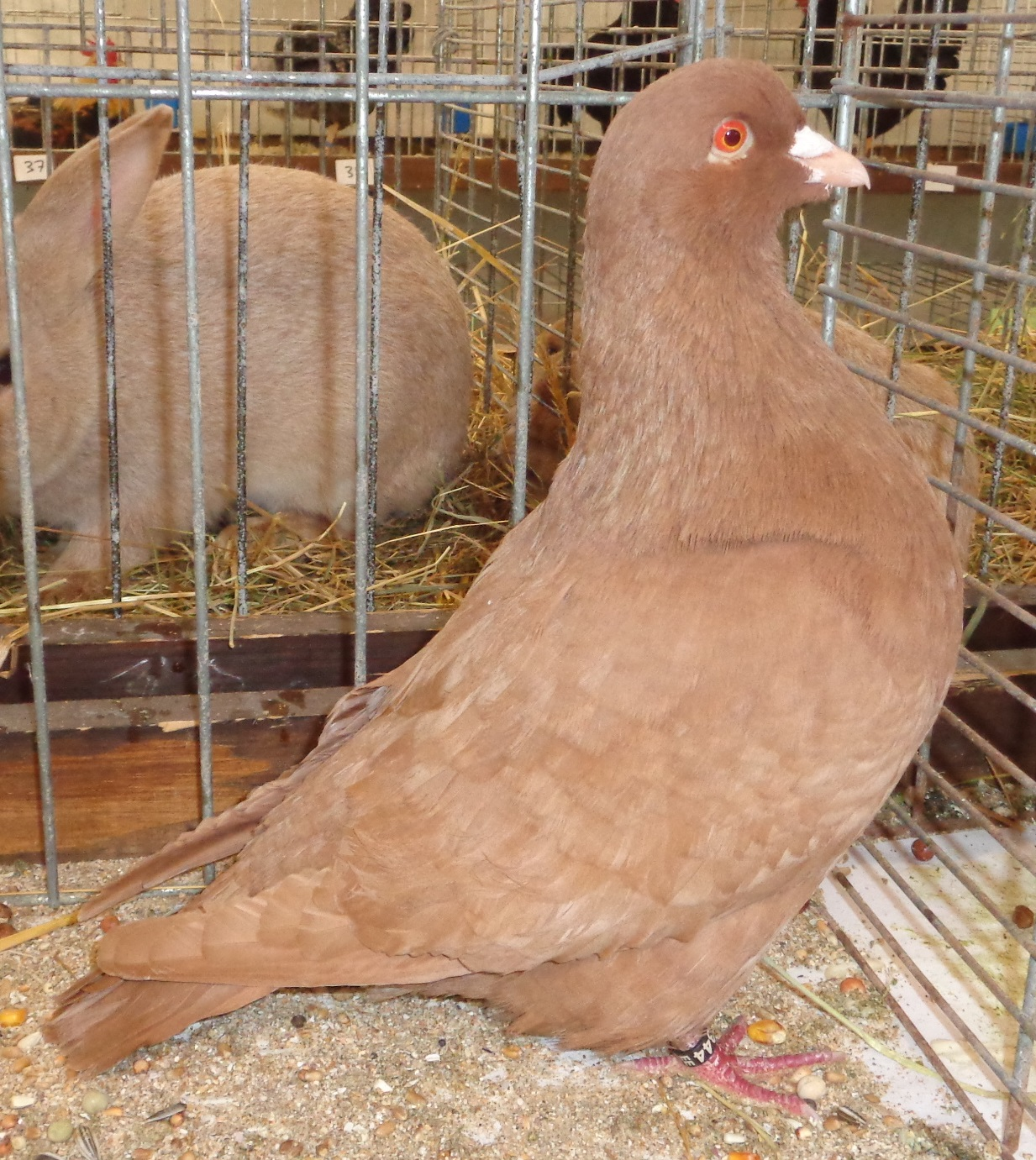
Carneau Yellow
- Carrier (GB/101) (= English Carrier)
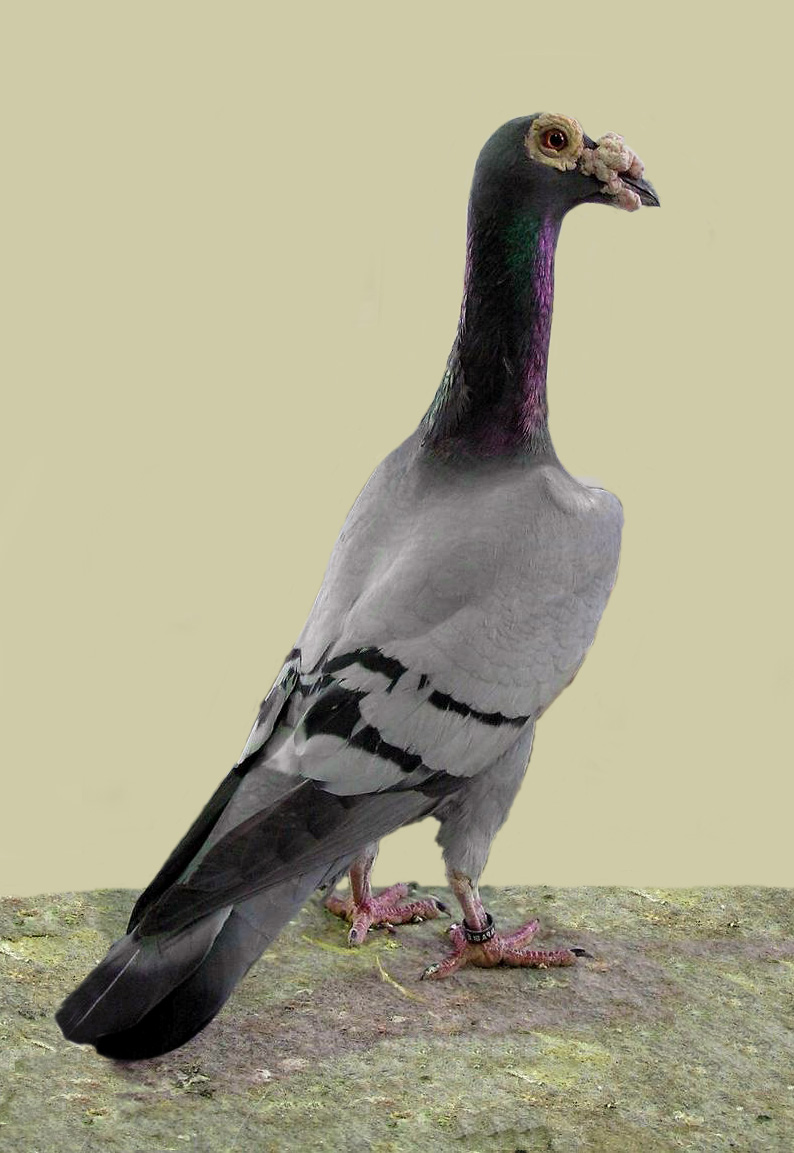
Blue bar English Carrier
- Catalan Tumbler (E/928)
- Catalan Head and Neck Tumbler
- Catalan Laced Bordench Mondain
- Cauchois (F/008)
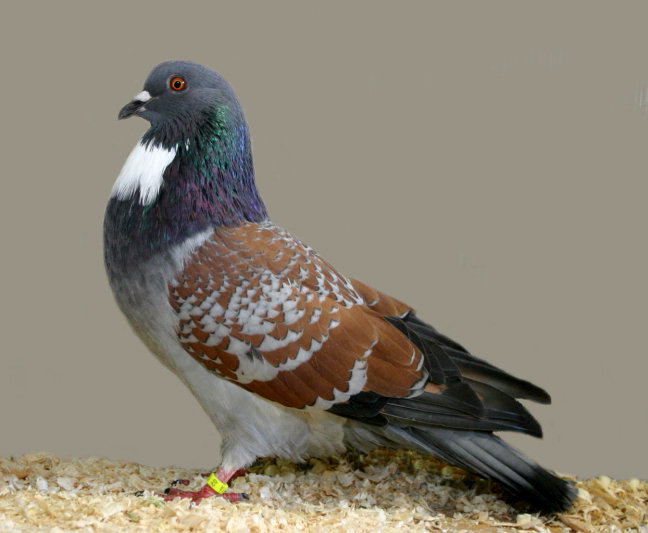
Cauchois Red laced

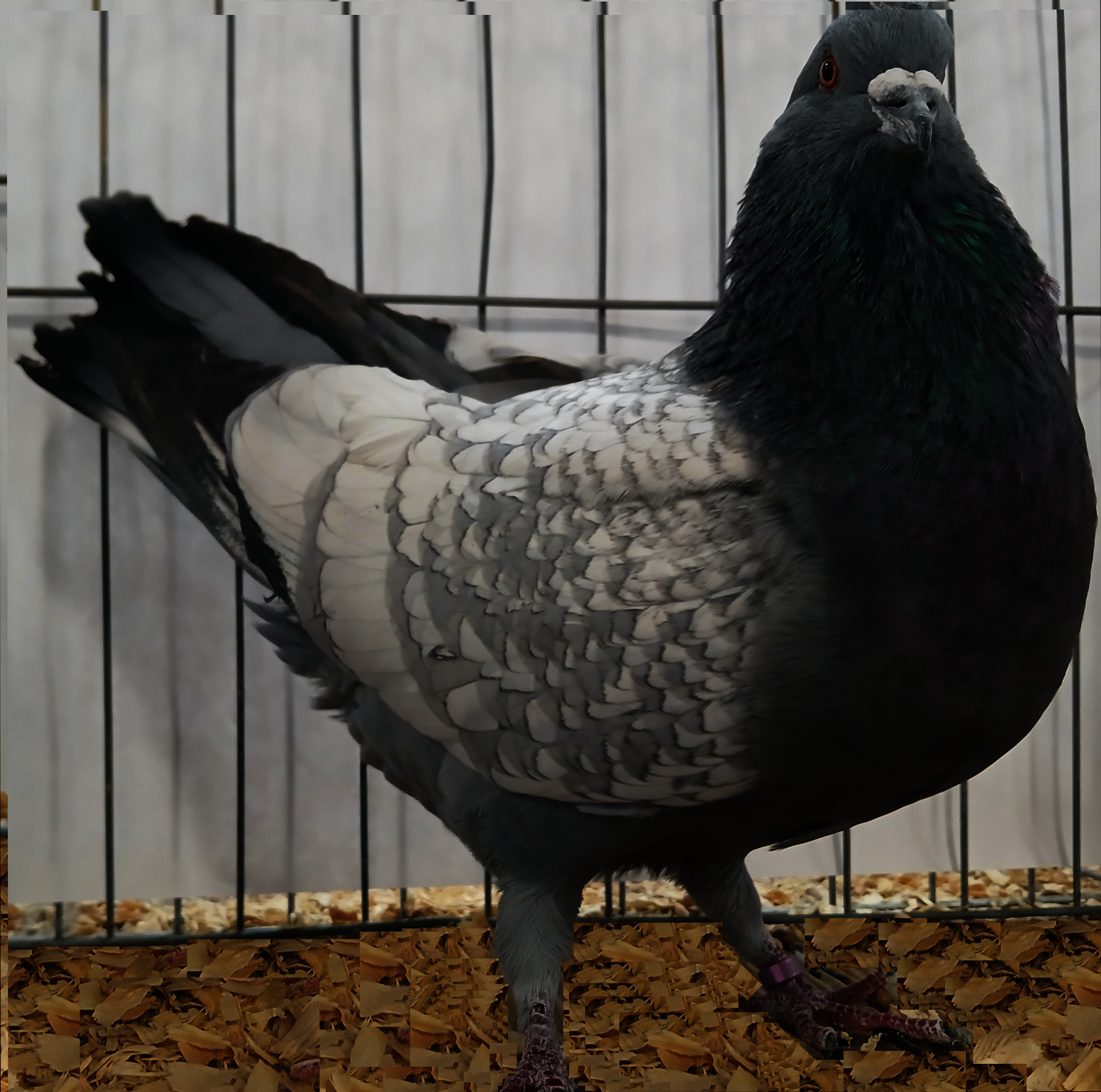
Cauchois White check
- Central Asiatic Roller
- Chinese Flying Pigeon (= Chinese Nasal Tuft; Chinese Tumbler (D/914))
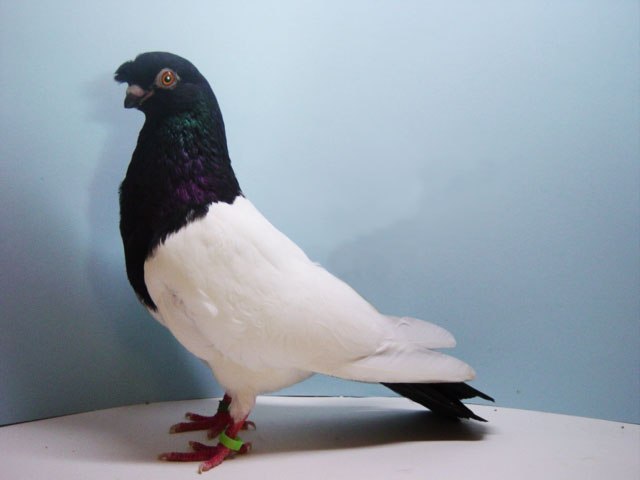
Black Chinese Nasal Tuft
- Chinese Owl pigeon (D/609)
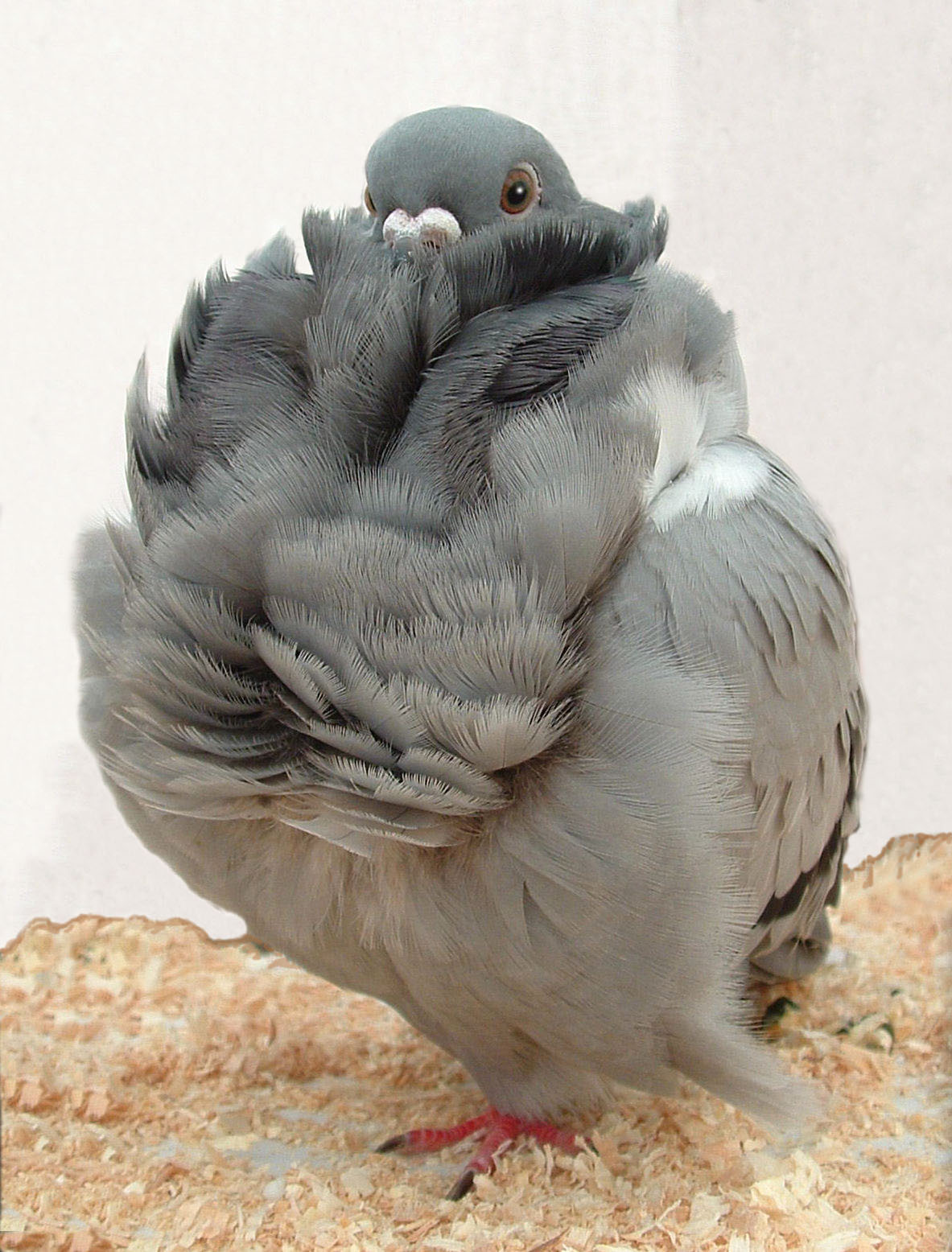
Chinese Owl front view

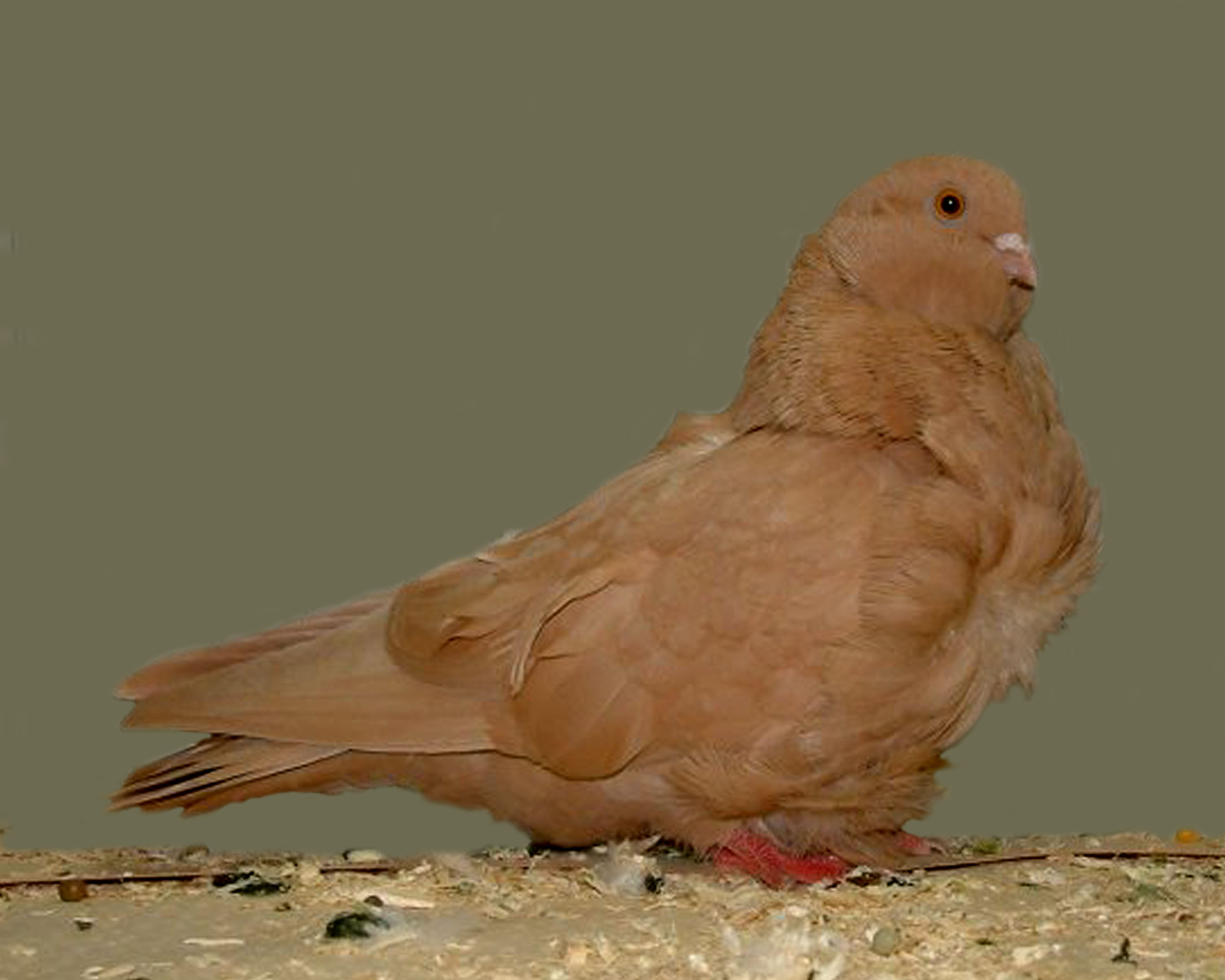
Yellow Chinese Owl
- Chistopolian High-flying Pigeon
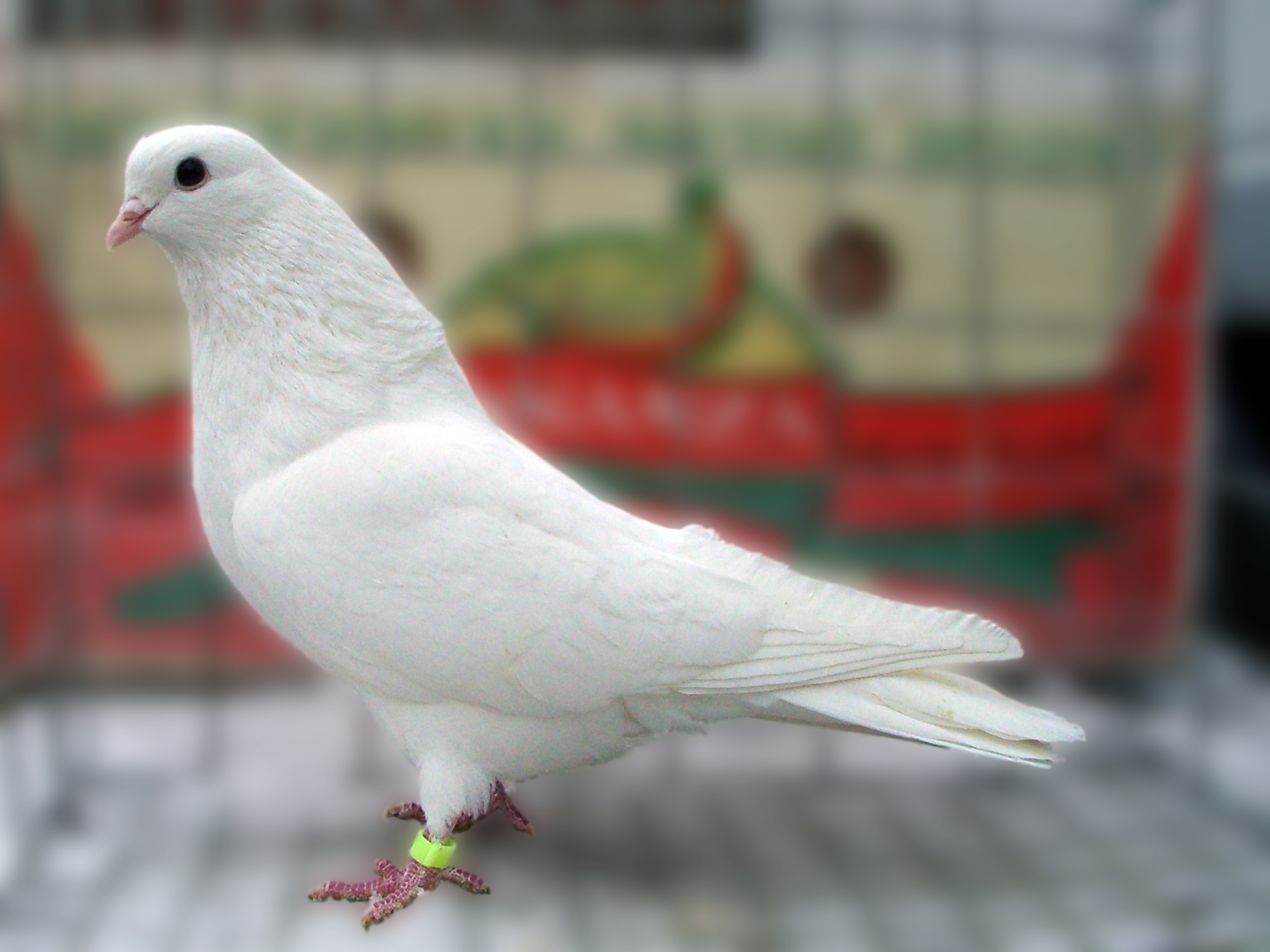
White Chistopolian
- Chorrera (E/610)
- Clean-legged Full-head Swallow pigeon
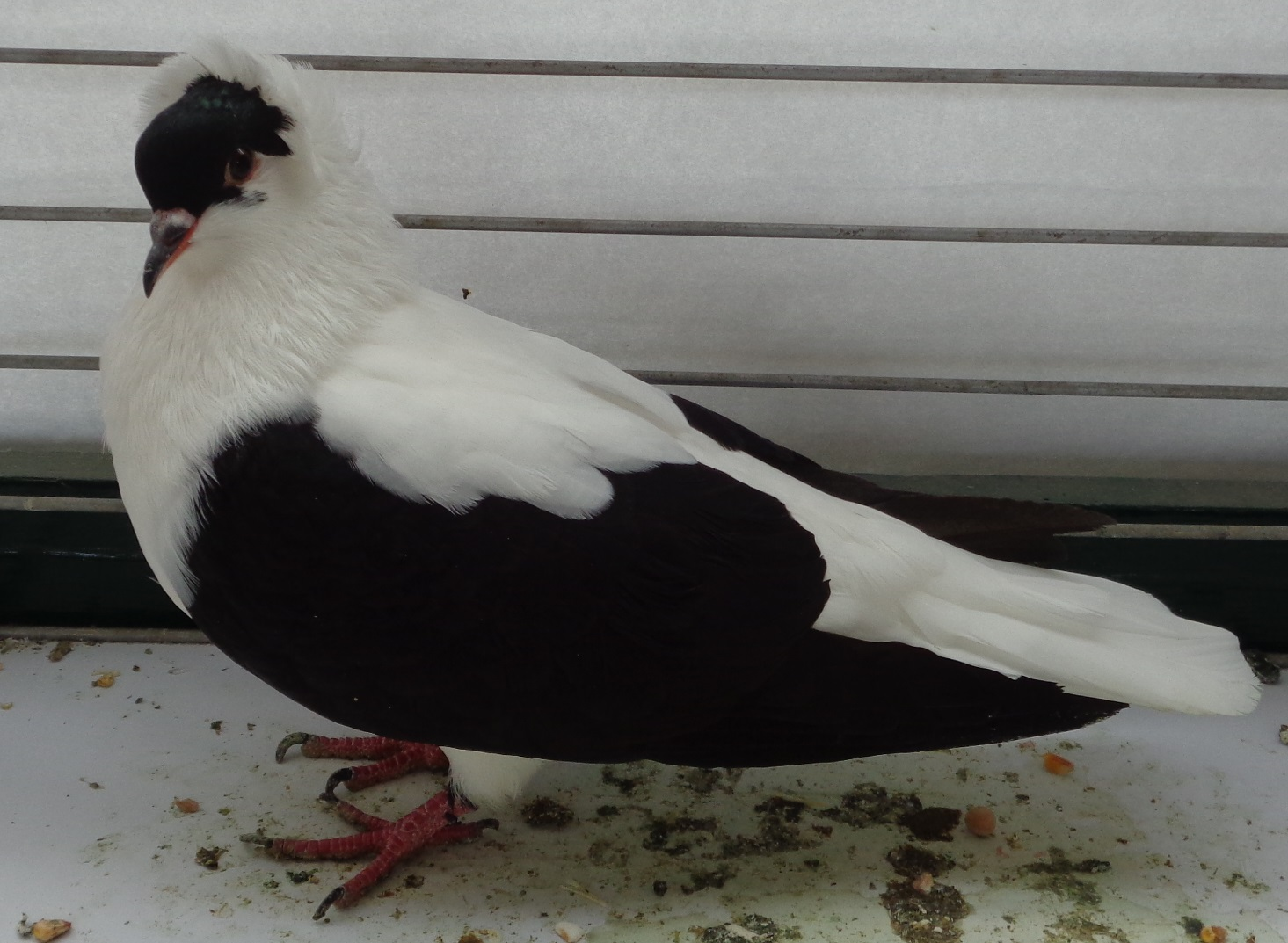
Clean leg Swallow
- Clean-legged Spot Swallow pigeon
- Cluj-Napoca Blue (RO/975)
- Cluj-Napoca Roller (RO/976)
- Cluj-Napoca Tumbler (RO/979)
- Coburg Lark pigeon (D/025)
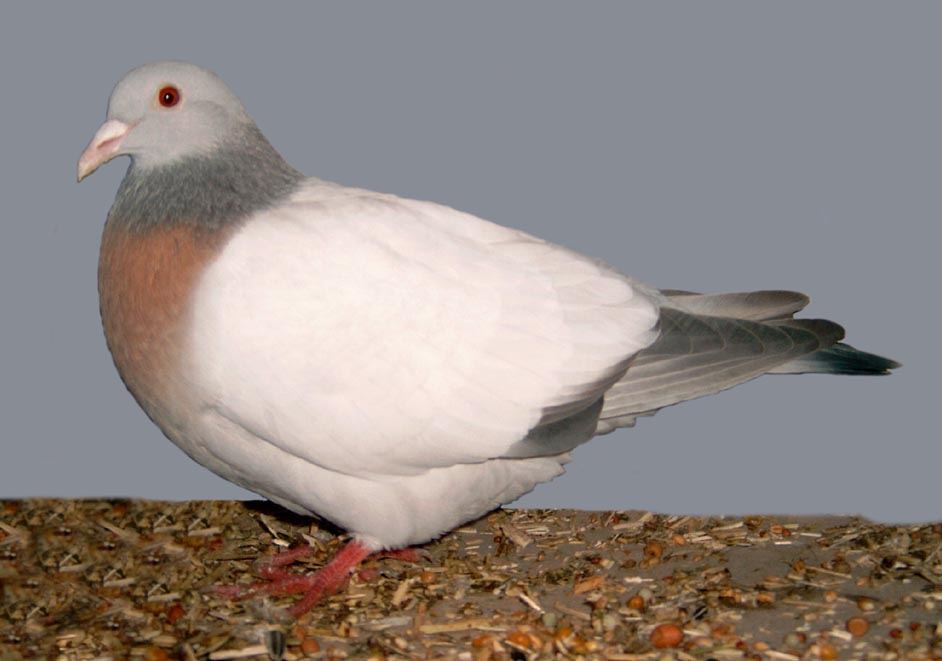
Coburg Lark
- Colillano Cropper (E/336)
- Cologne Tumbler (D/827)
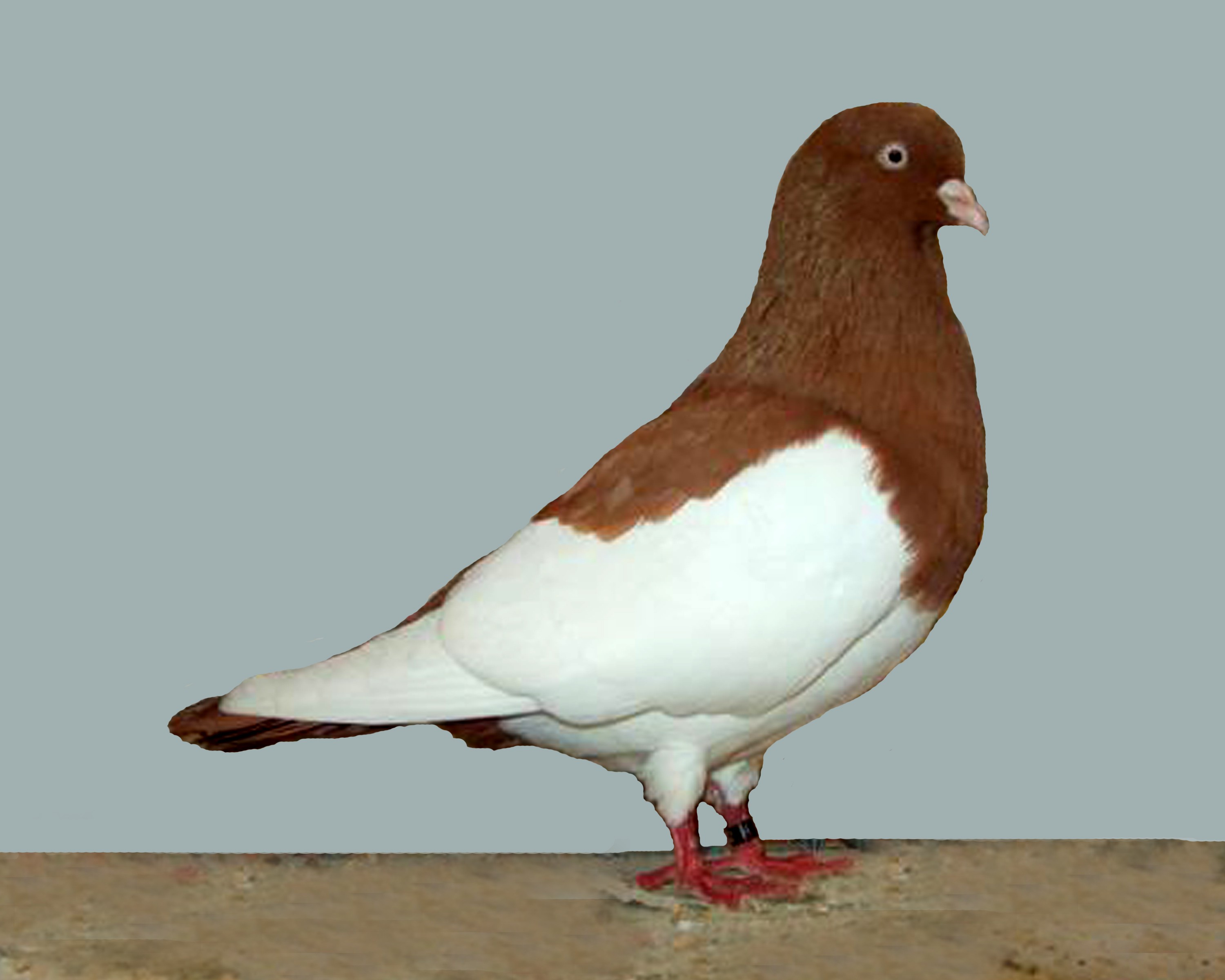
Red magpied Cologne Tumbler

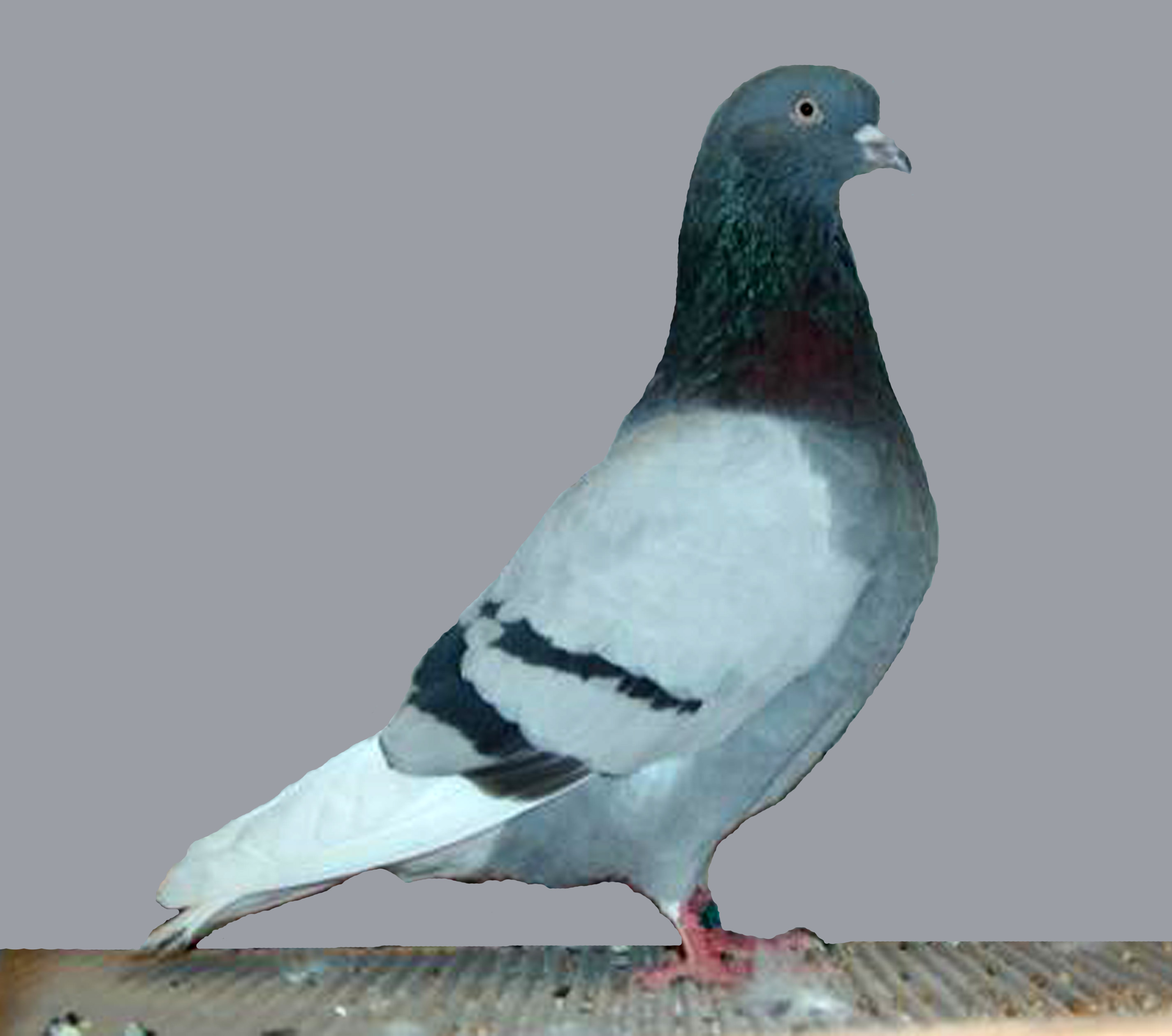
Blue bar Cologne Tumbler
- Craiova chestnutbrown Tumbler (RO/973) (Romanian: Castaniu de Craiova)
- Crescent
- Crested Picard (F/017)
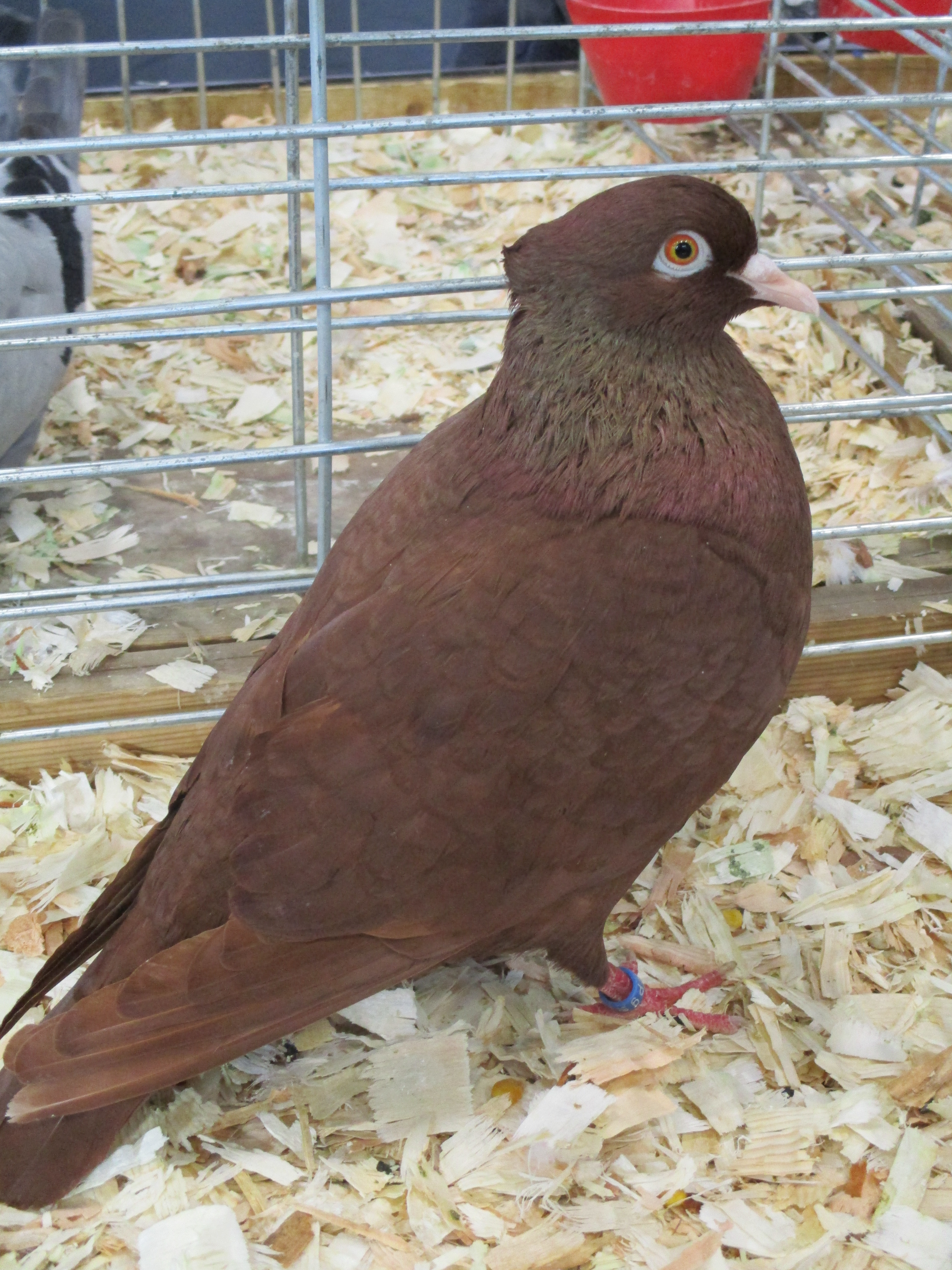
Red Crested Picard
- Crested Soultz (F/018)
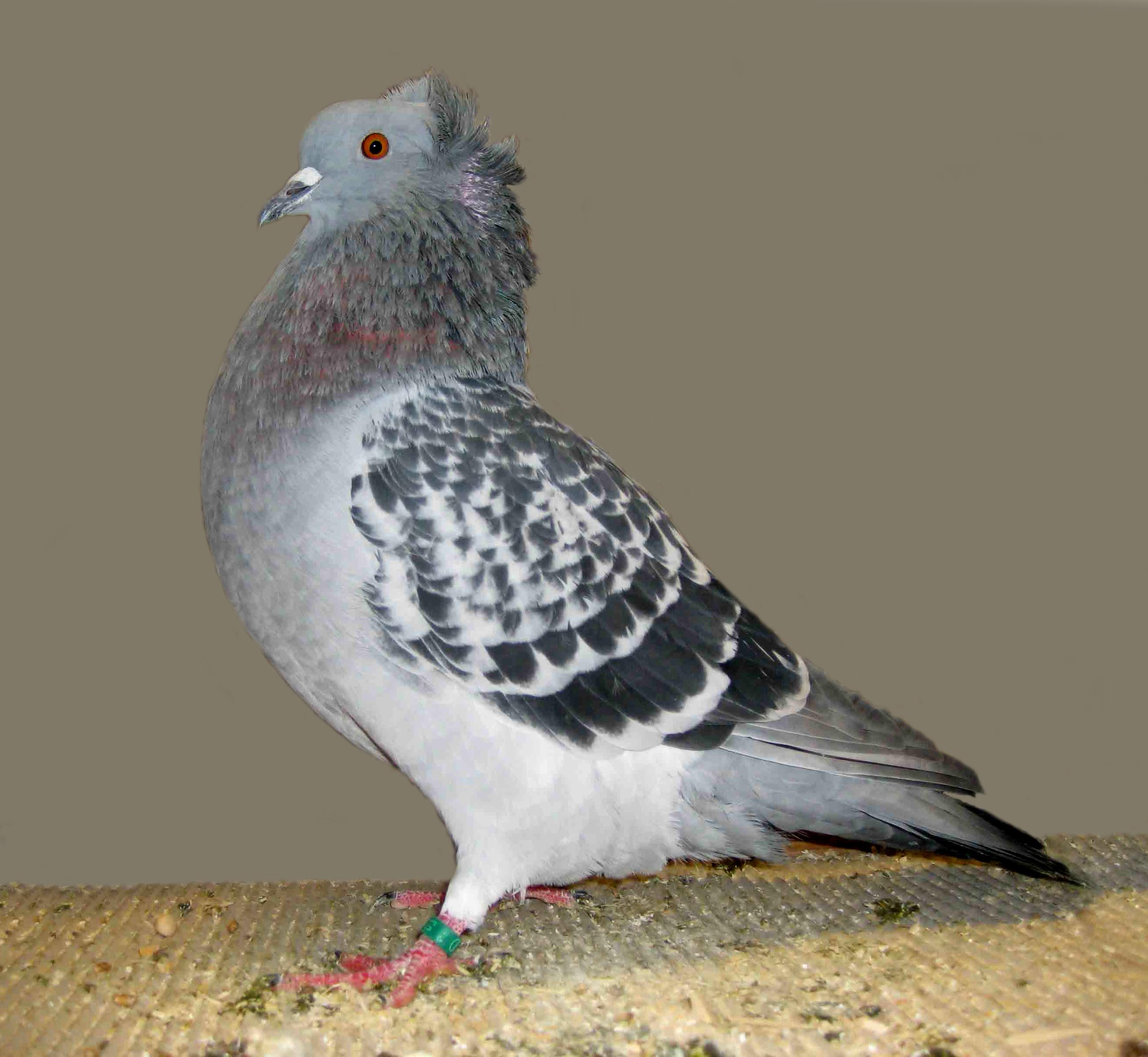
Blue check Crested Soultz

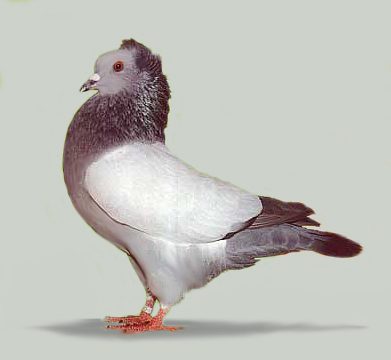
Blue varless Crested Soultz
- Criador Lusitano (P/016)
- Csepel Tumbler (H/956)
- Cumulet (GB/822)
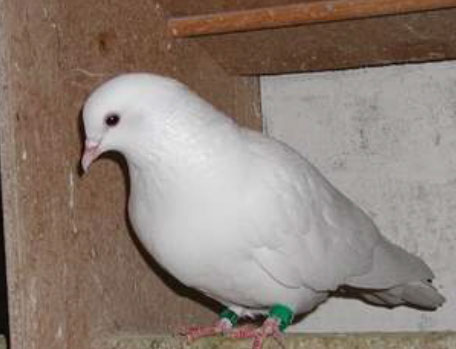
White Cumulet
- Czech Bagdad (= Bohemian Bagdad (CZ/110))
- Czech Ice Pouter (= Bohemian Ice Cropper (CZ/325))
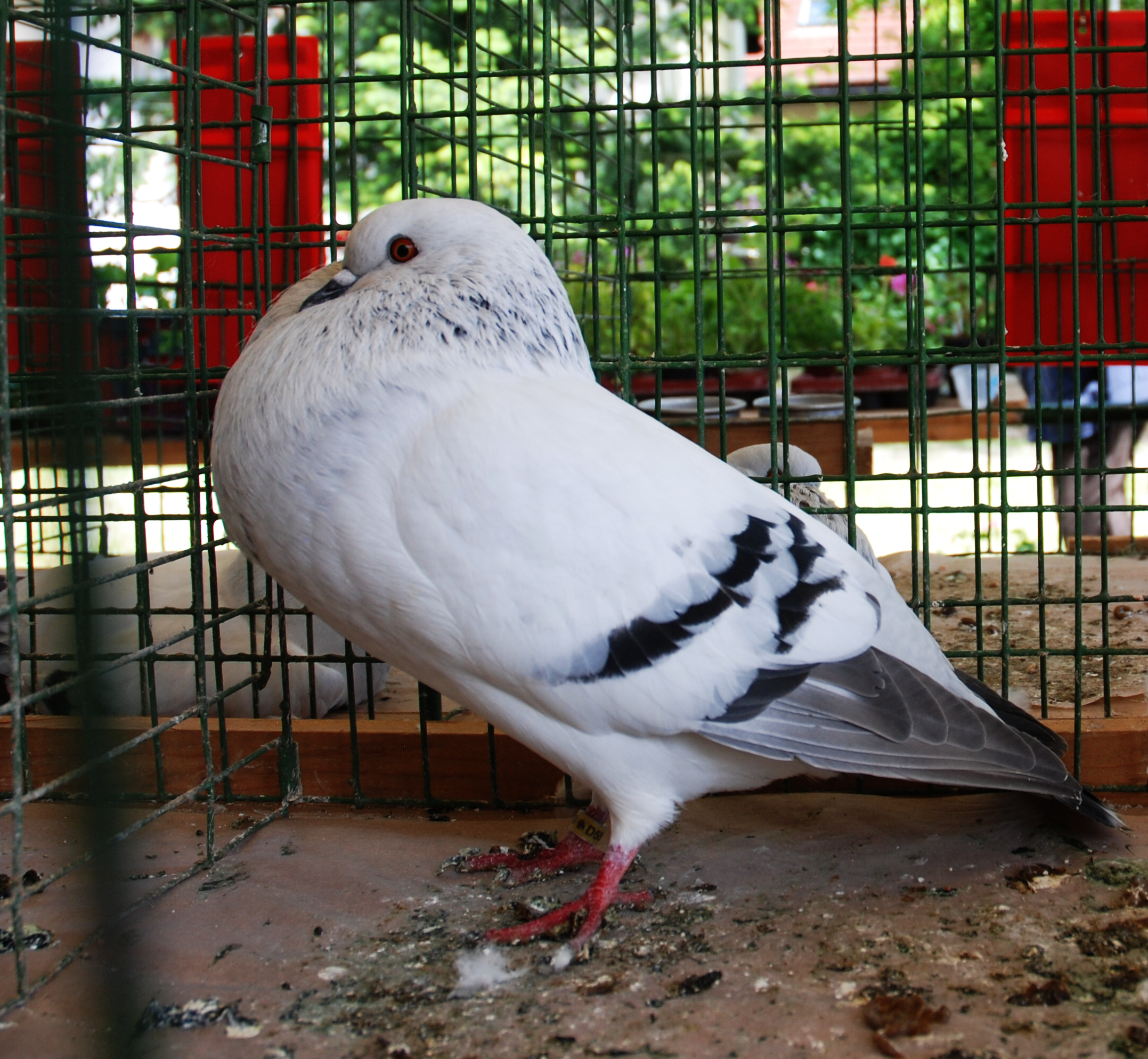
Czech/Bohemian Ice Cropper
- Czech Muffed Tumbler (= Bohemian Tumbler ((CZ/967)[1]
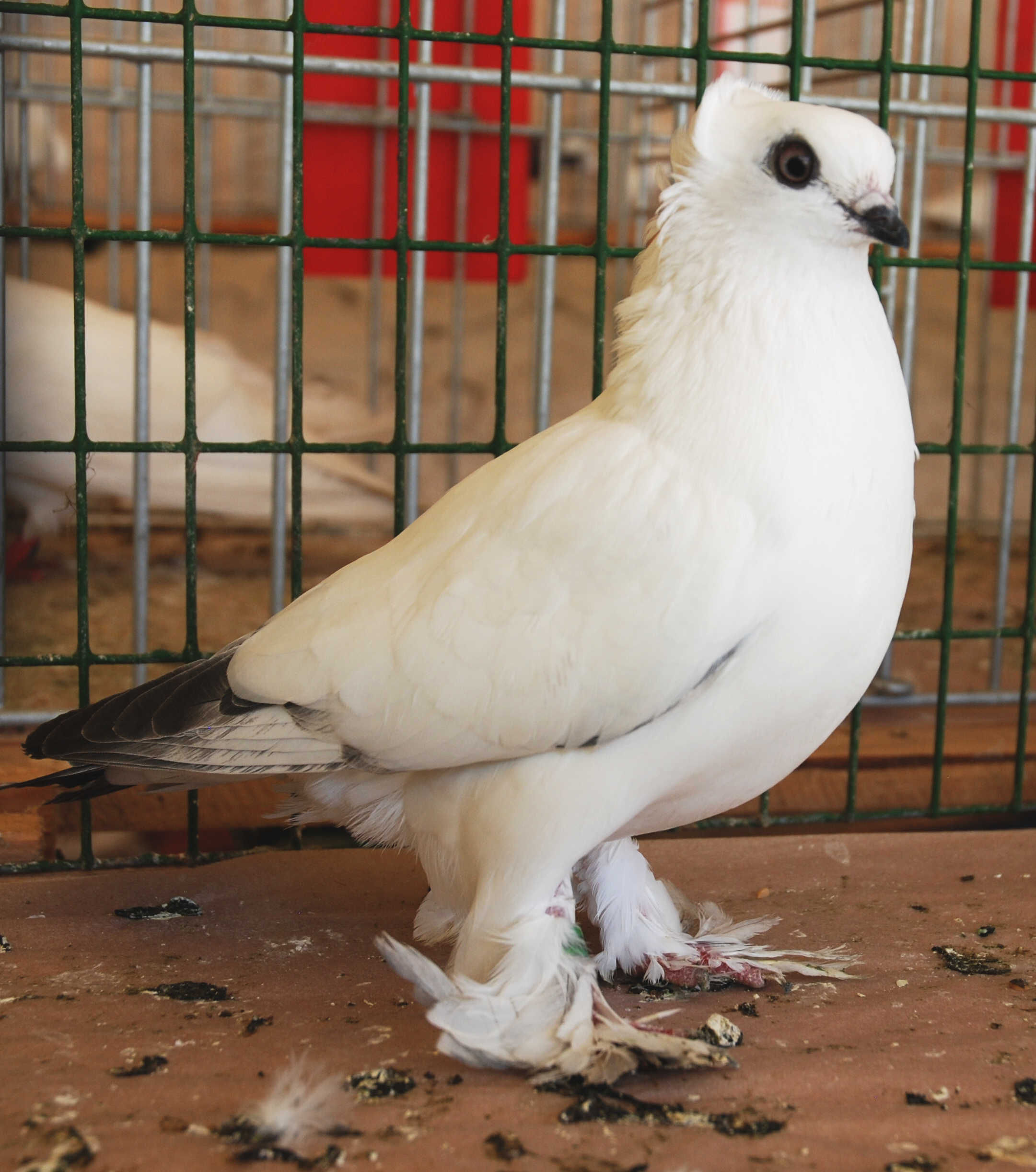
Czech/Bohemain Tumbler
- Czech Trumpeter (= Bohemian Trumpeter (CZ/516))
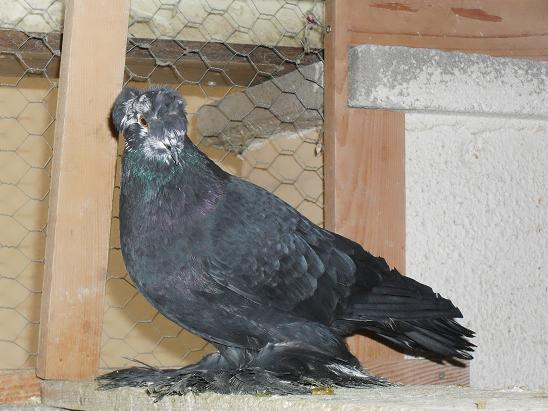
Chezh/Bohemian Trumpeter

== D ==
- Damascene (GB/042)
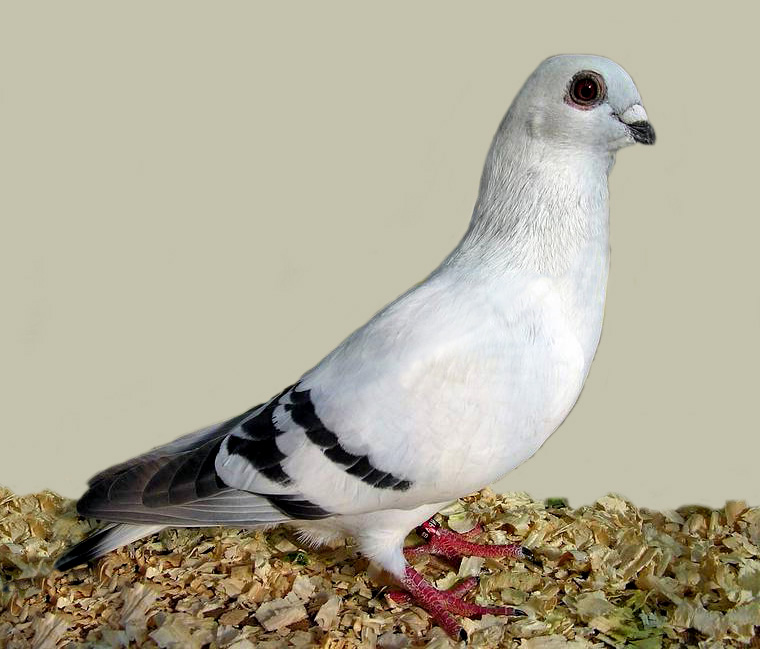
Damascene
- Danish Copper (DK/349)
- Danish Jacobin (DK/604)
- Danish Suabian (DK/404)
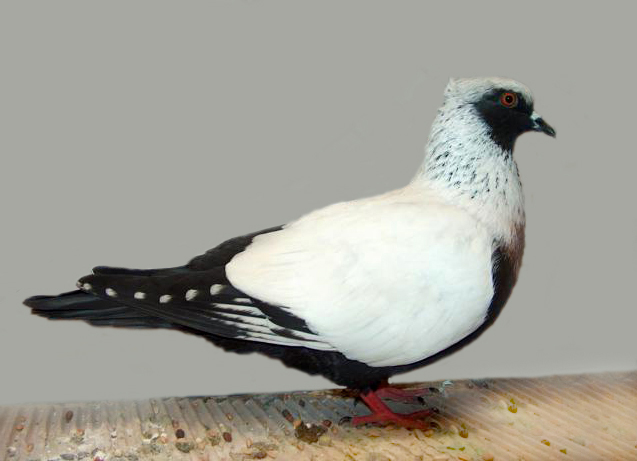
Danish Suabien
- Danish Tumbler (DK/810)
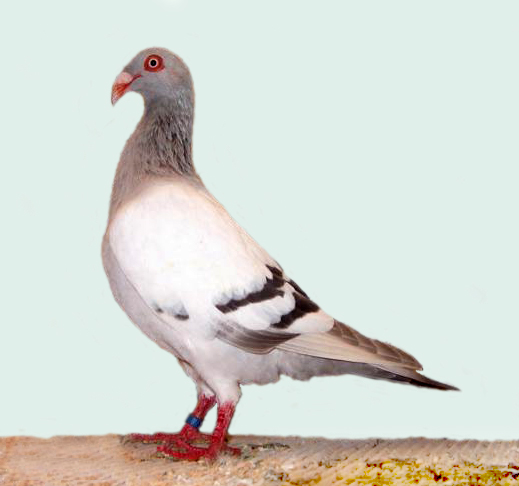
Silver bar Danish Tumbler

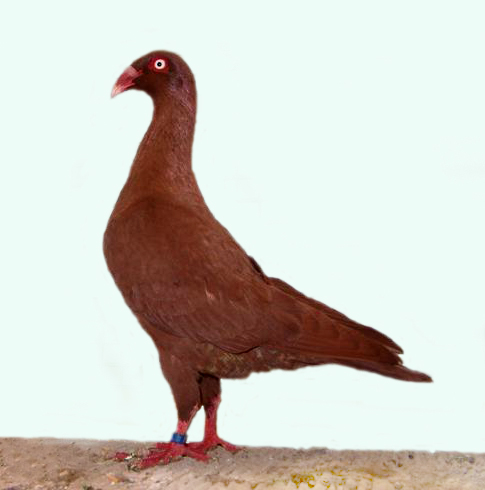
Red Danish Tumbler
- Danzig Highflyer (D/816)
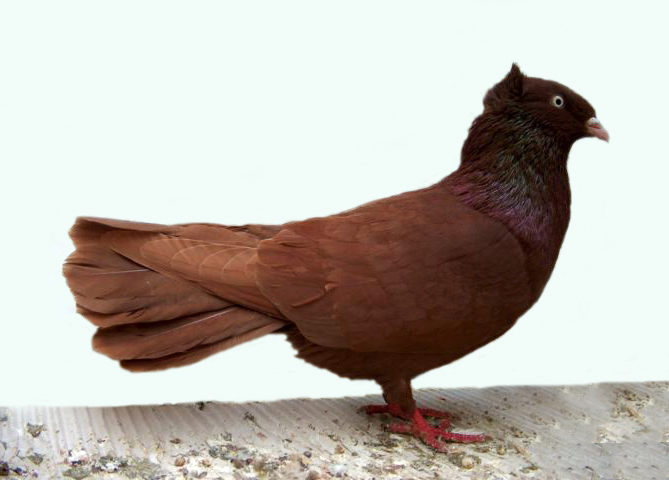
Red Danzig Highflier

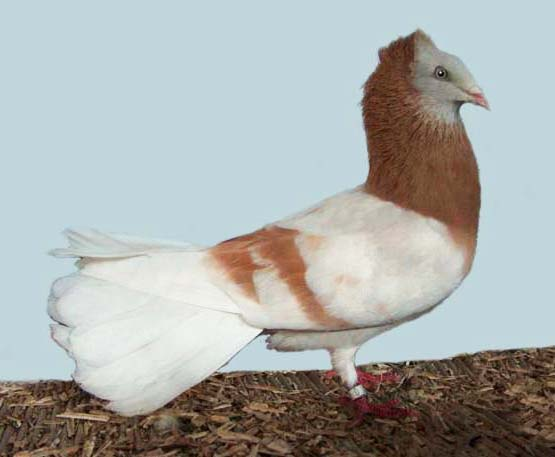
Cream bar Danzig Highflier
- Debrecin Roller (H/849)
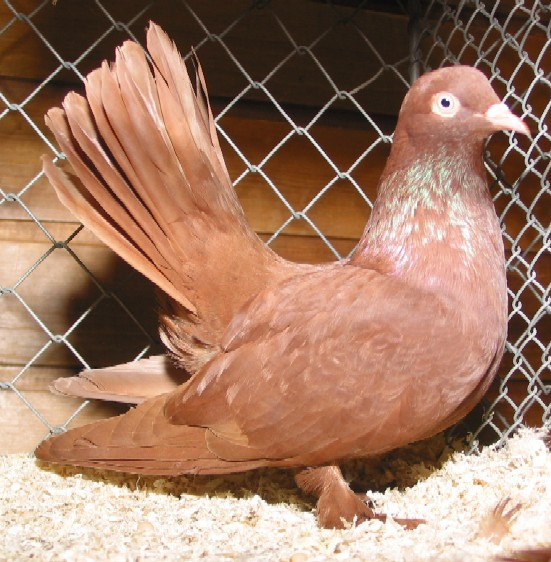
Red Debrecin Roller
- Denizli Bangosu
- Dobrudshan Roller (BG/988)
- Dolapci
- Domestic Show Flight (ESKT/915)= American Domestic Flight
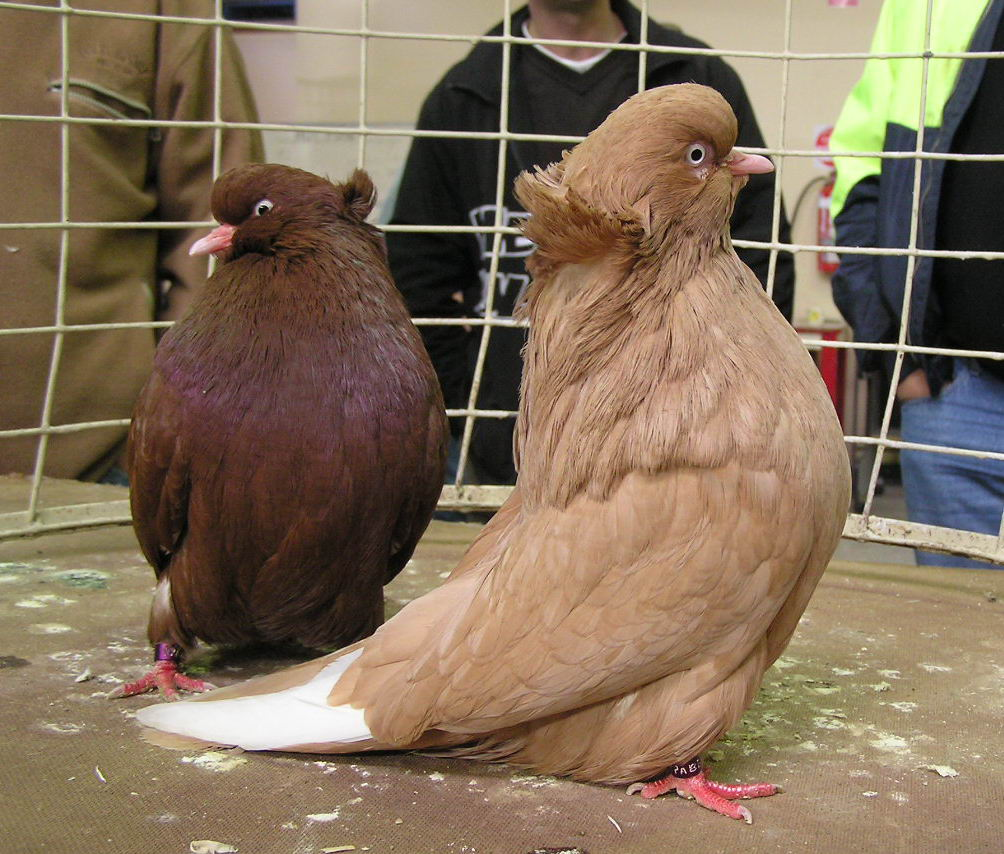

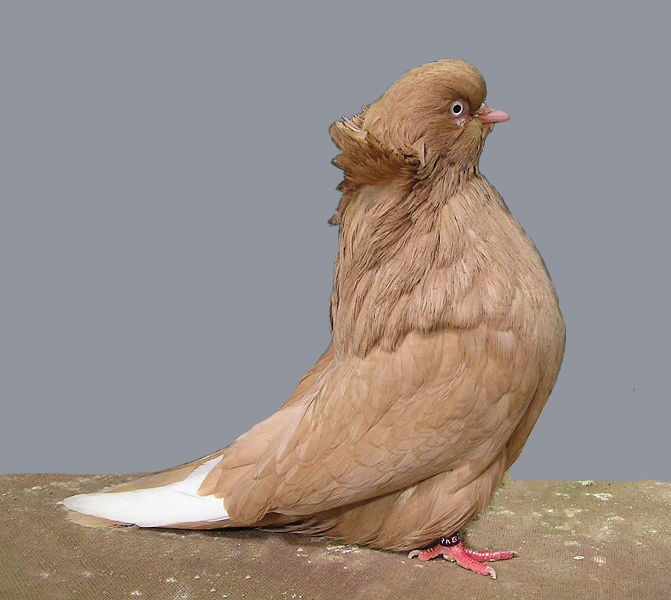

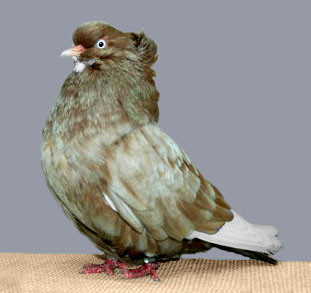

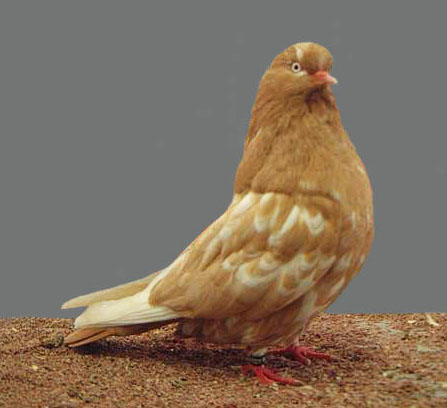
- Domino Frill (GB/715)
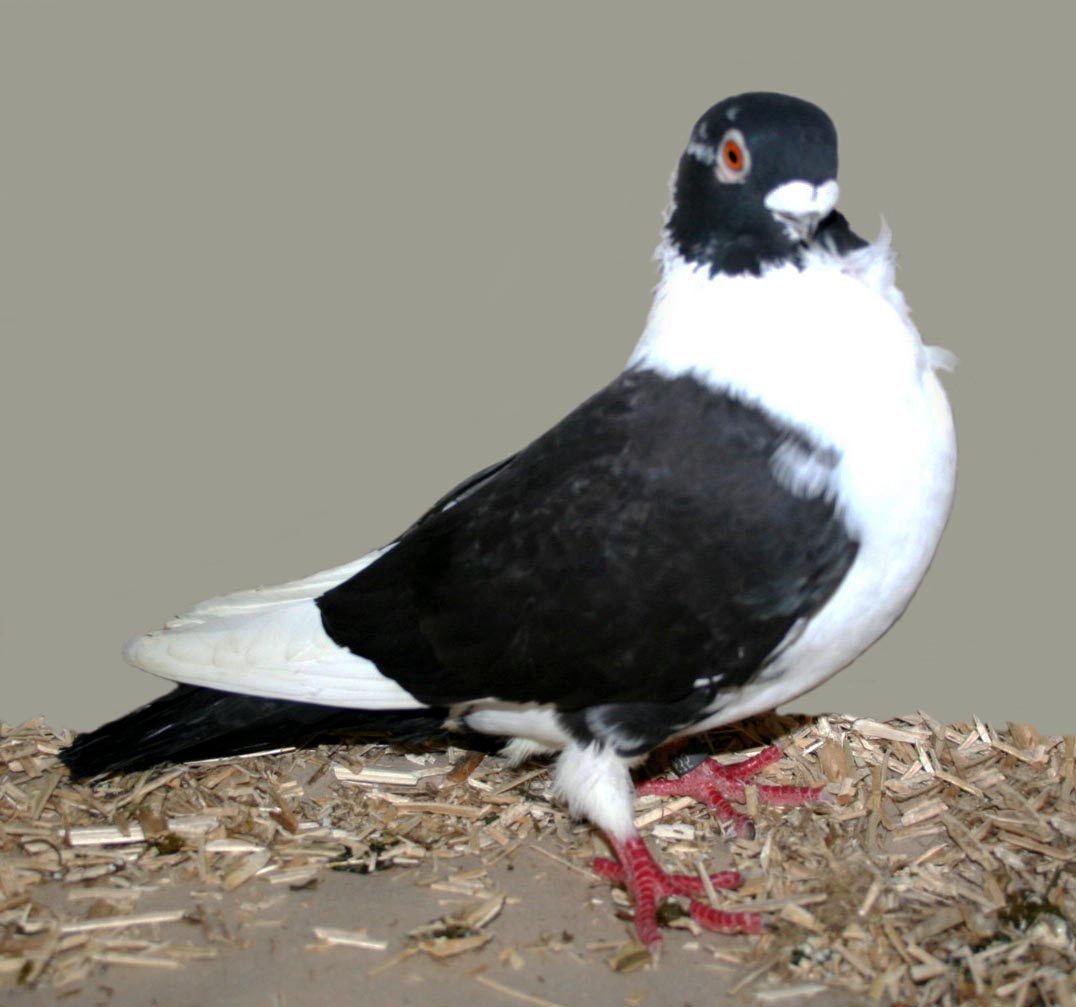
Black Domino
- Donek (= Dunek)
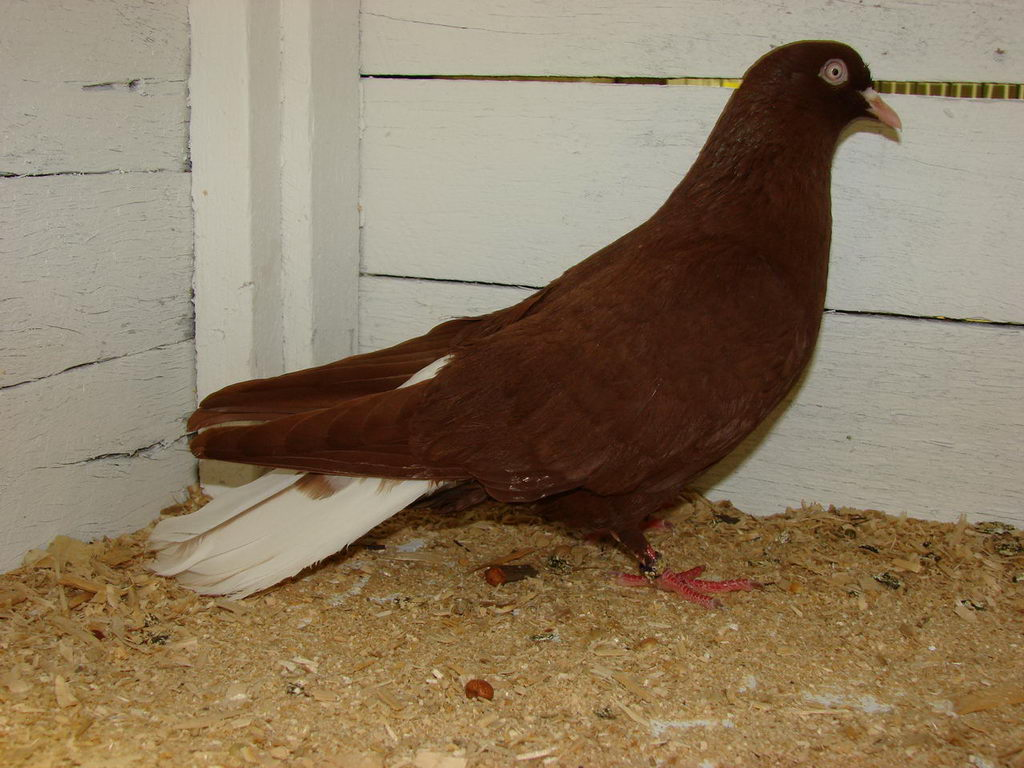
Donek
- Dragoon (GB/104)
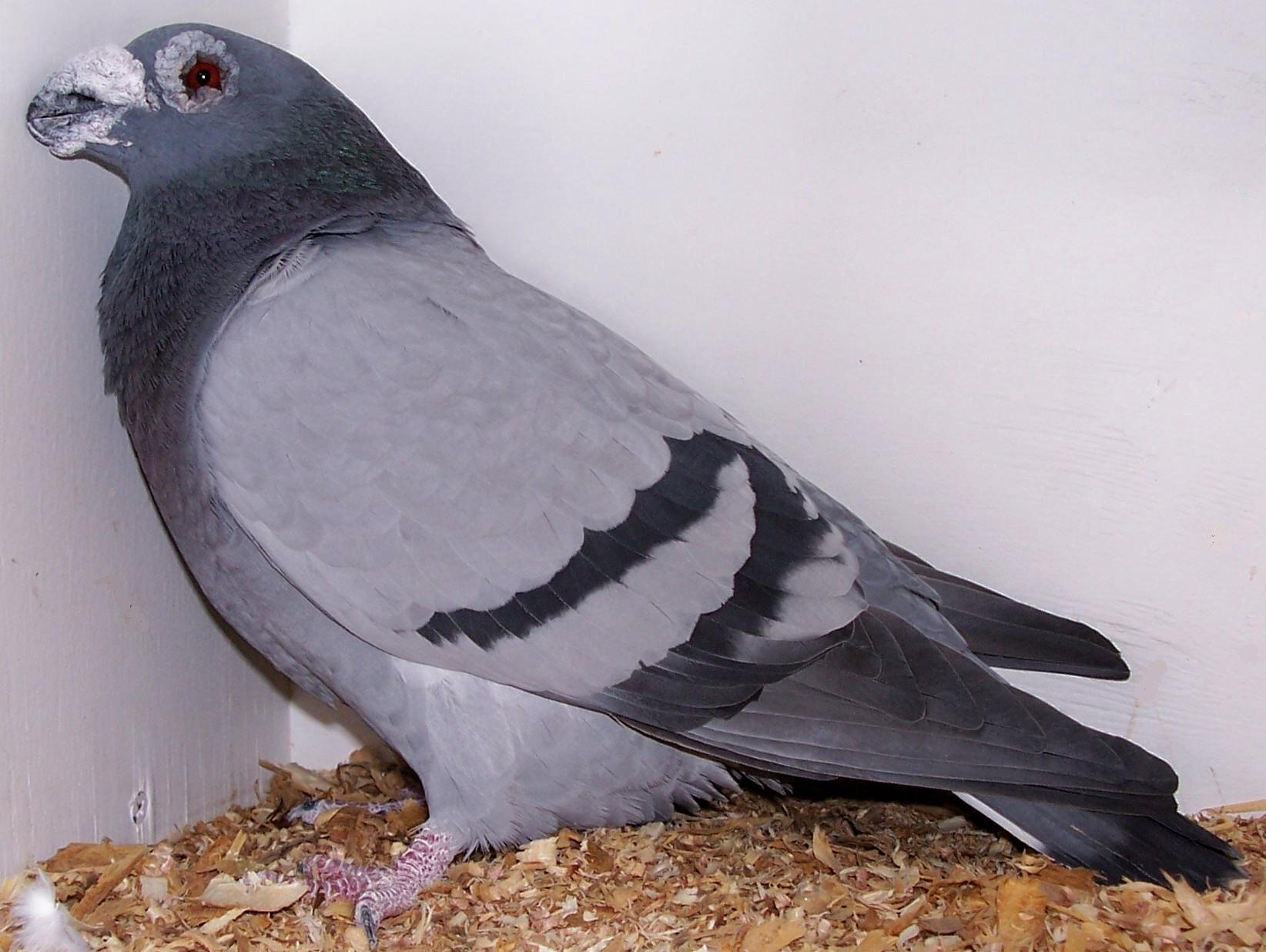
Dragoon Blue Bar
- Dresden Trumpeter (D/505)
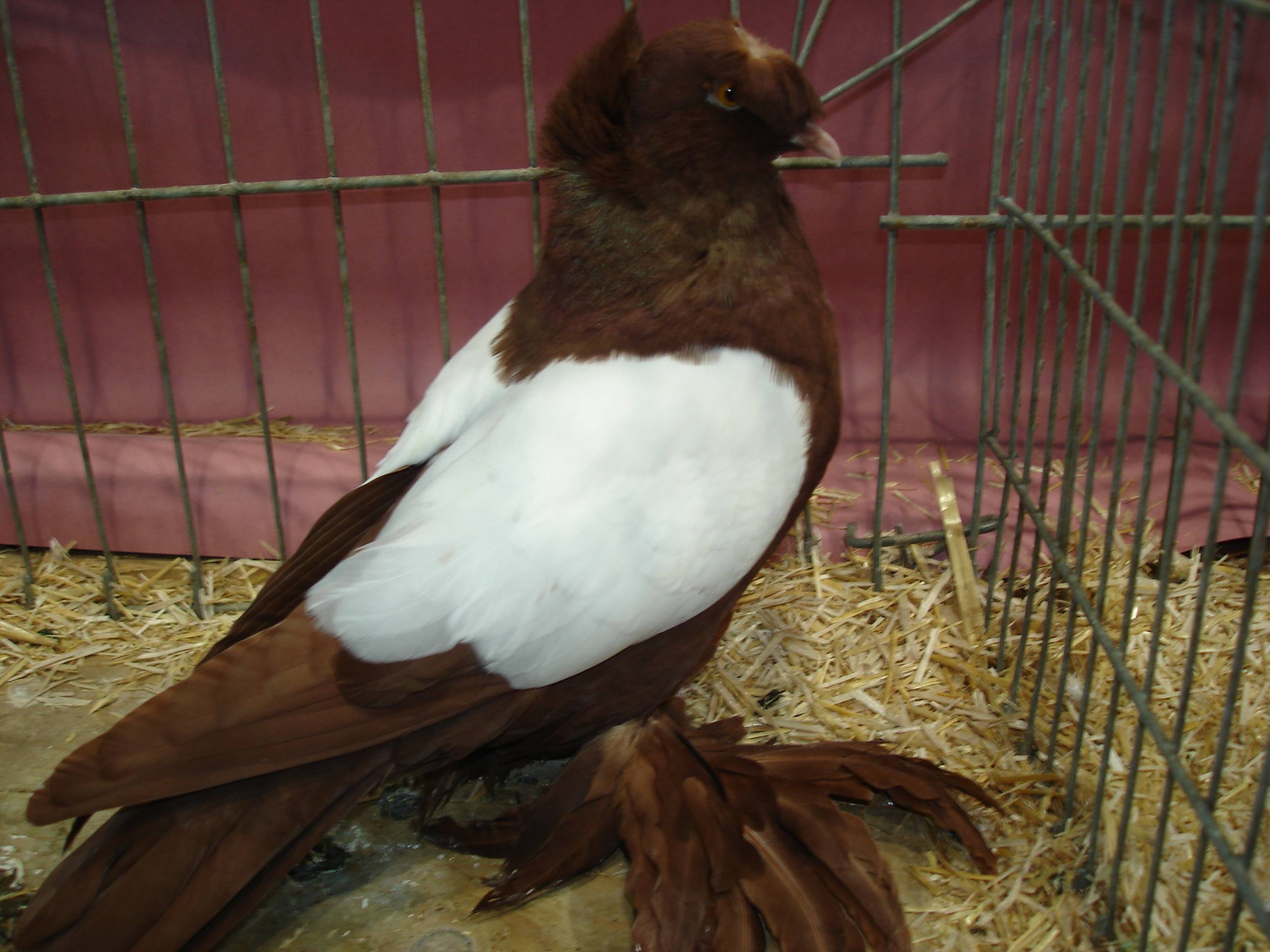
Turkot drezdeńsk
- Dutch Beauty Homer (NL/033)
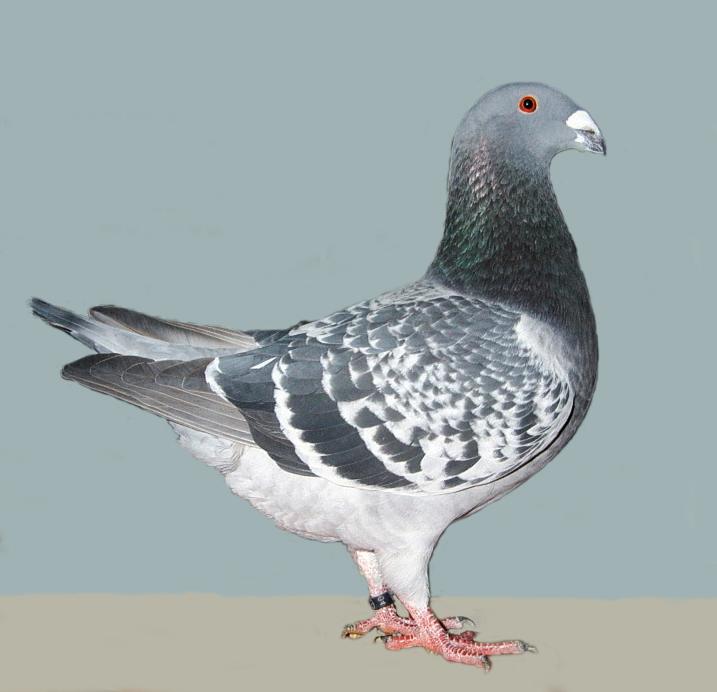
Dutch Beauty Homer
- Dutch Cropper (NL/302)
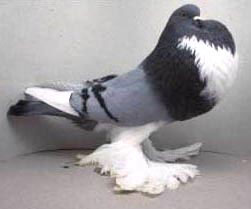
Dutch Cropper
- Dutch Curled Cropper (NL/352)
- Dutch Helmet (NL/825)
- Dutch Highflyer (NL/824)
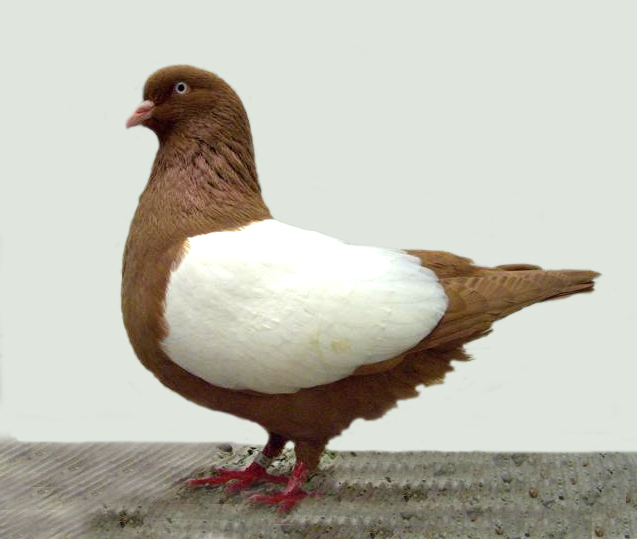
Shield marked Dutch Highflier

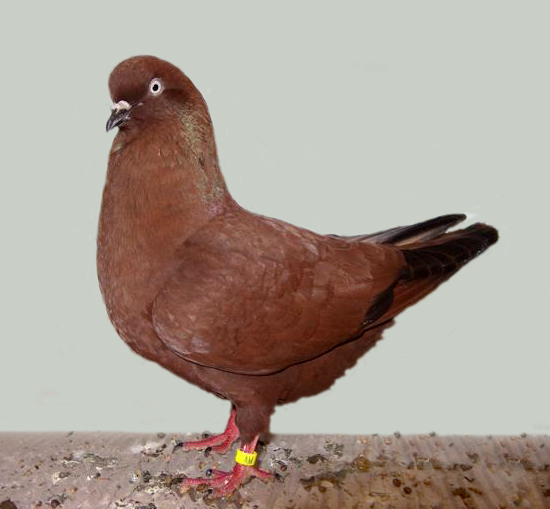
Red Bronzed Dutch Highflier

== E ==
- East Prussian Tumbler (D/819)
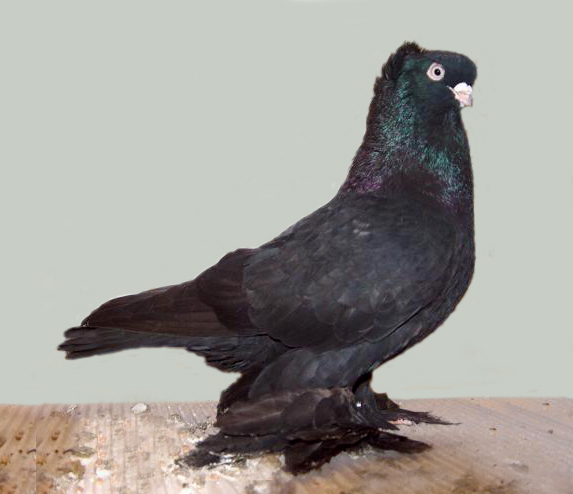
Black East Prussian Tumbler

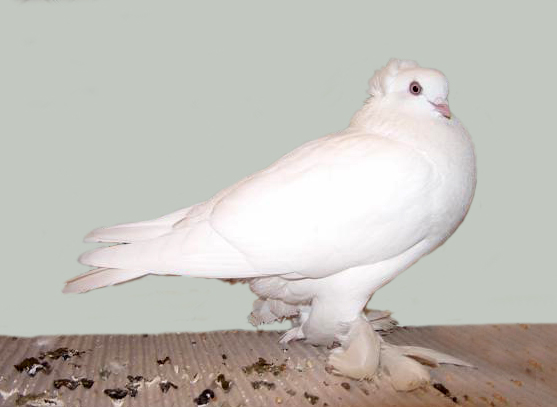
White East Prussian Tumbler
- Echterding Colour Pigeon (D/443)
- Egyptian Frill
- Egyptian Swift pigeon (GB/043)
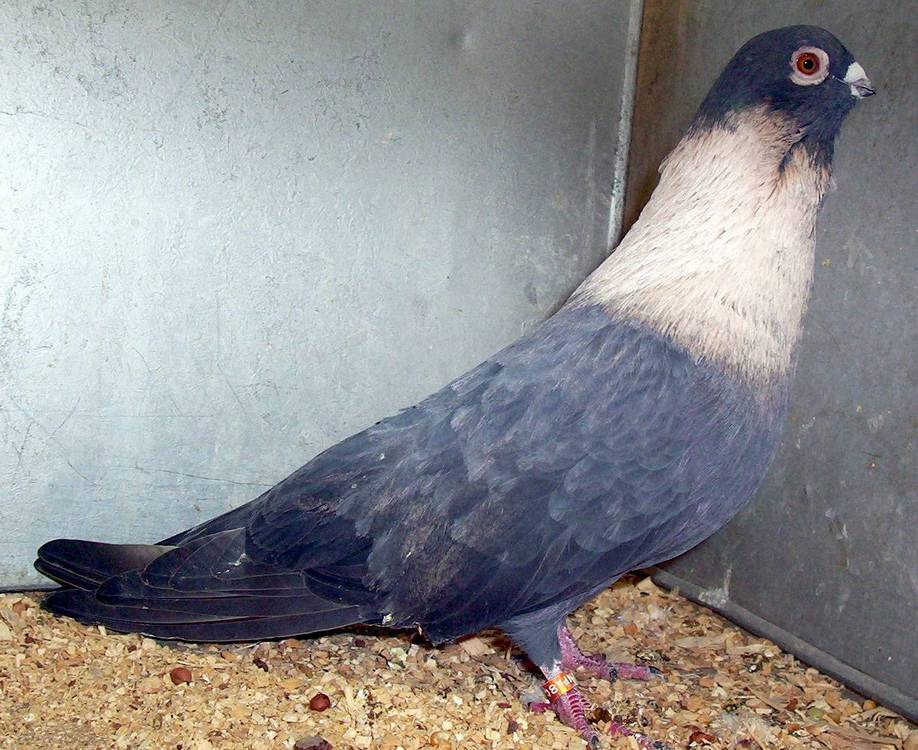
Egyptian Swift
- Egyptian Tumbler
- Eichbühl (CH/484)
- Eisk Double-crested Tumbler (RUS^{(D)}/870)
- Elbing White-head Tumbler (D/908)
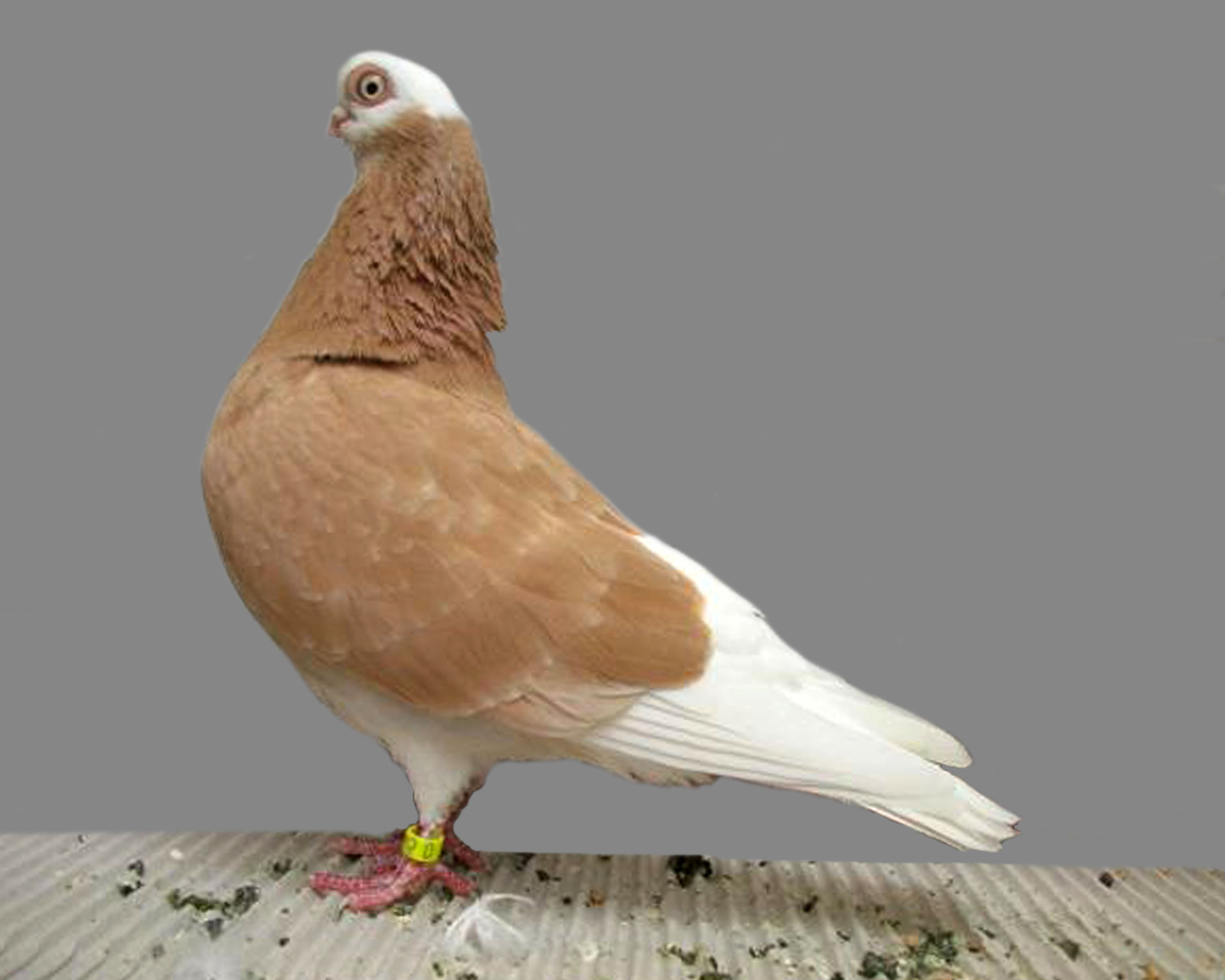
Yellow Elbing Whitehead

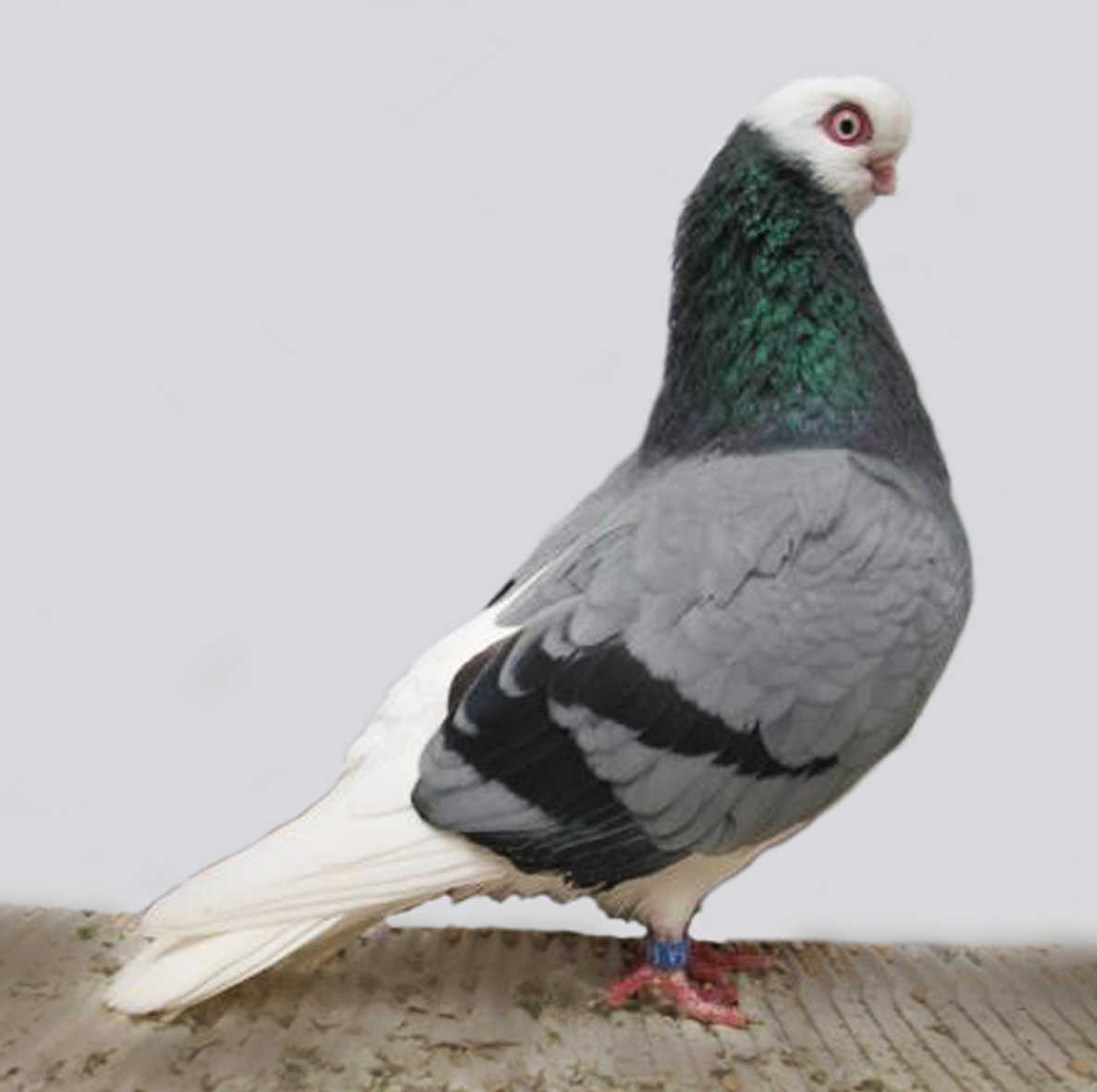
Blue bar Elbing Whitehead
- Elster Cropper (D/305)
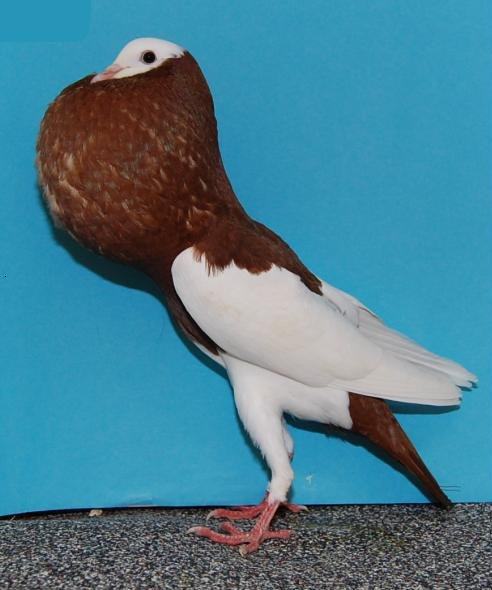
Red Elsterkröpfer
- Elster Purzler (= Old German Magpie Tumbler (D/828))
- English Barb (= Barb (GB/102))
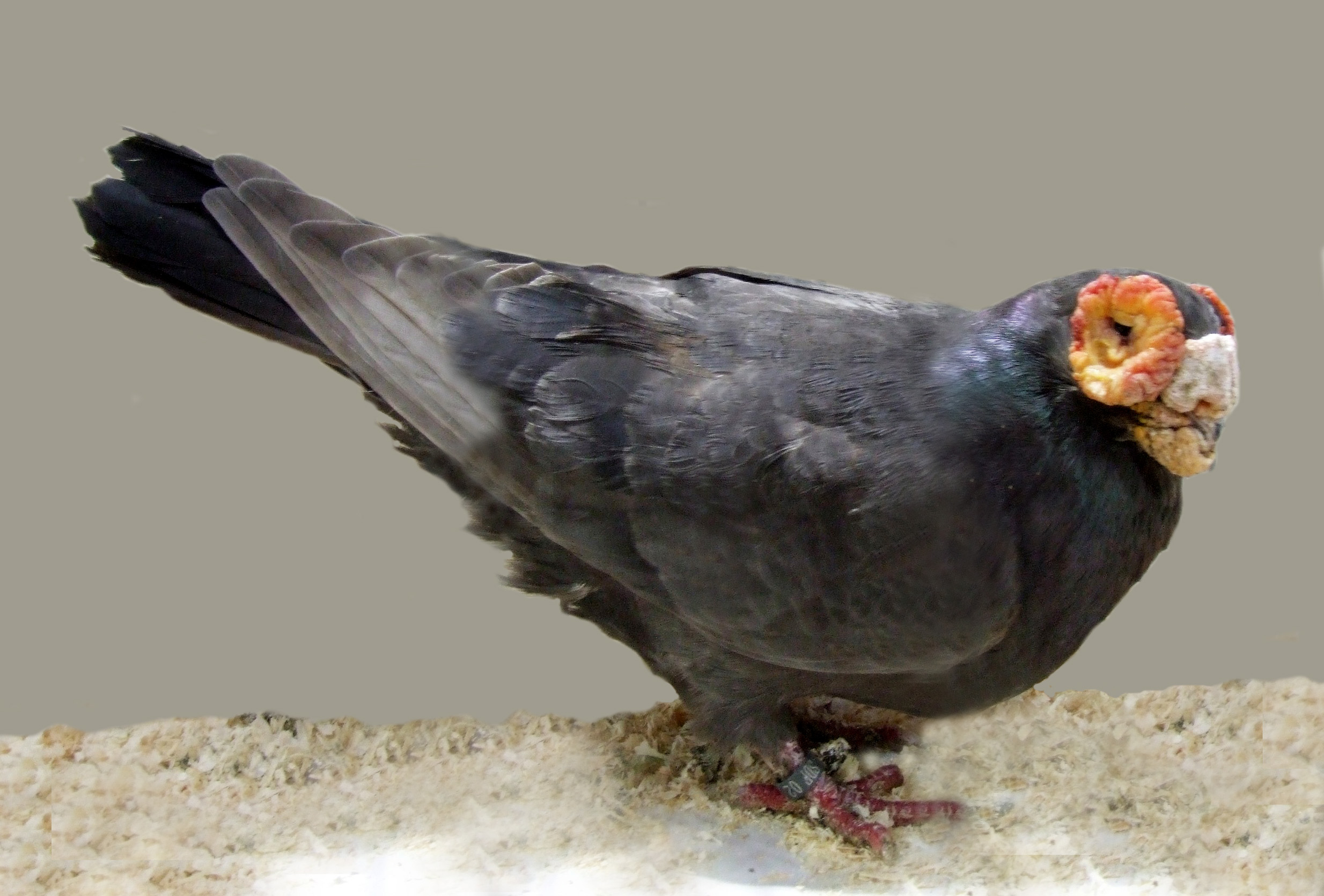
Black Barb
- English Carrier (= Carrier (GB/101))
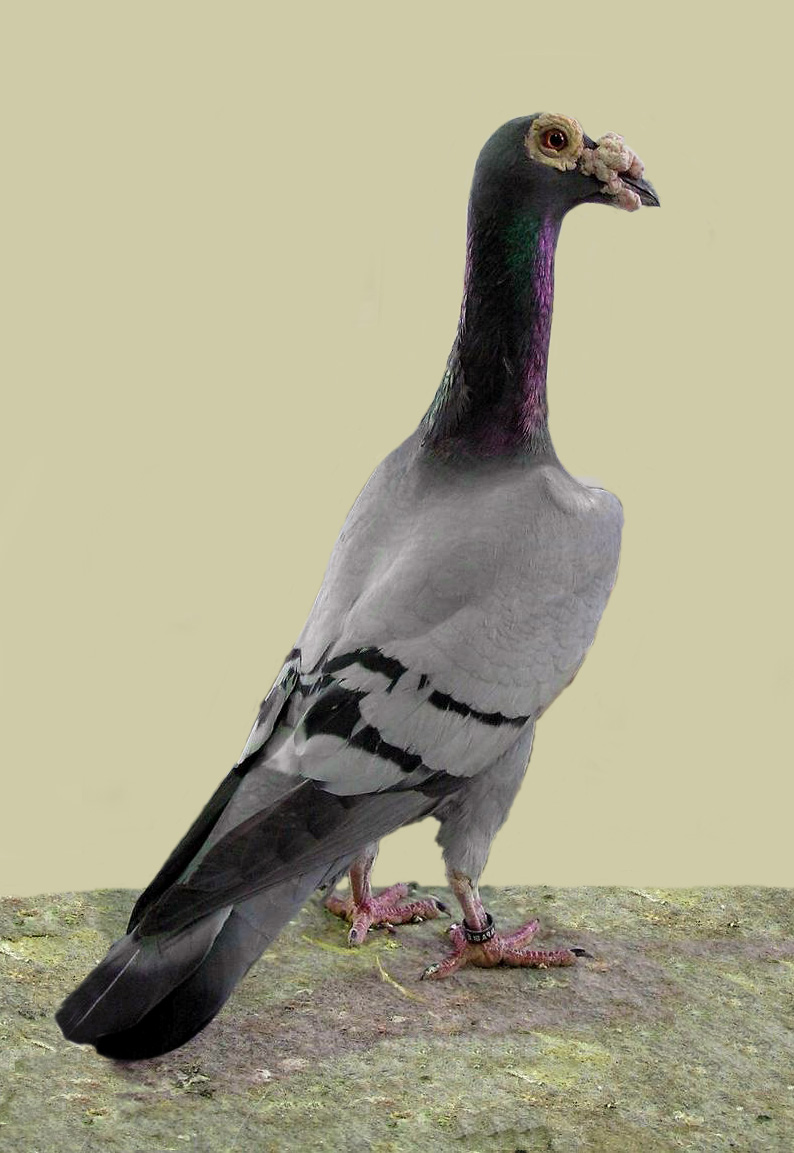
  Blue bar English Carrier
- English Exhibition Homer (= Exhibition Homer (GB/028))
- English Fantail (= Garden Fantail (GB/608))
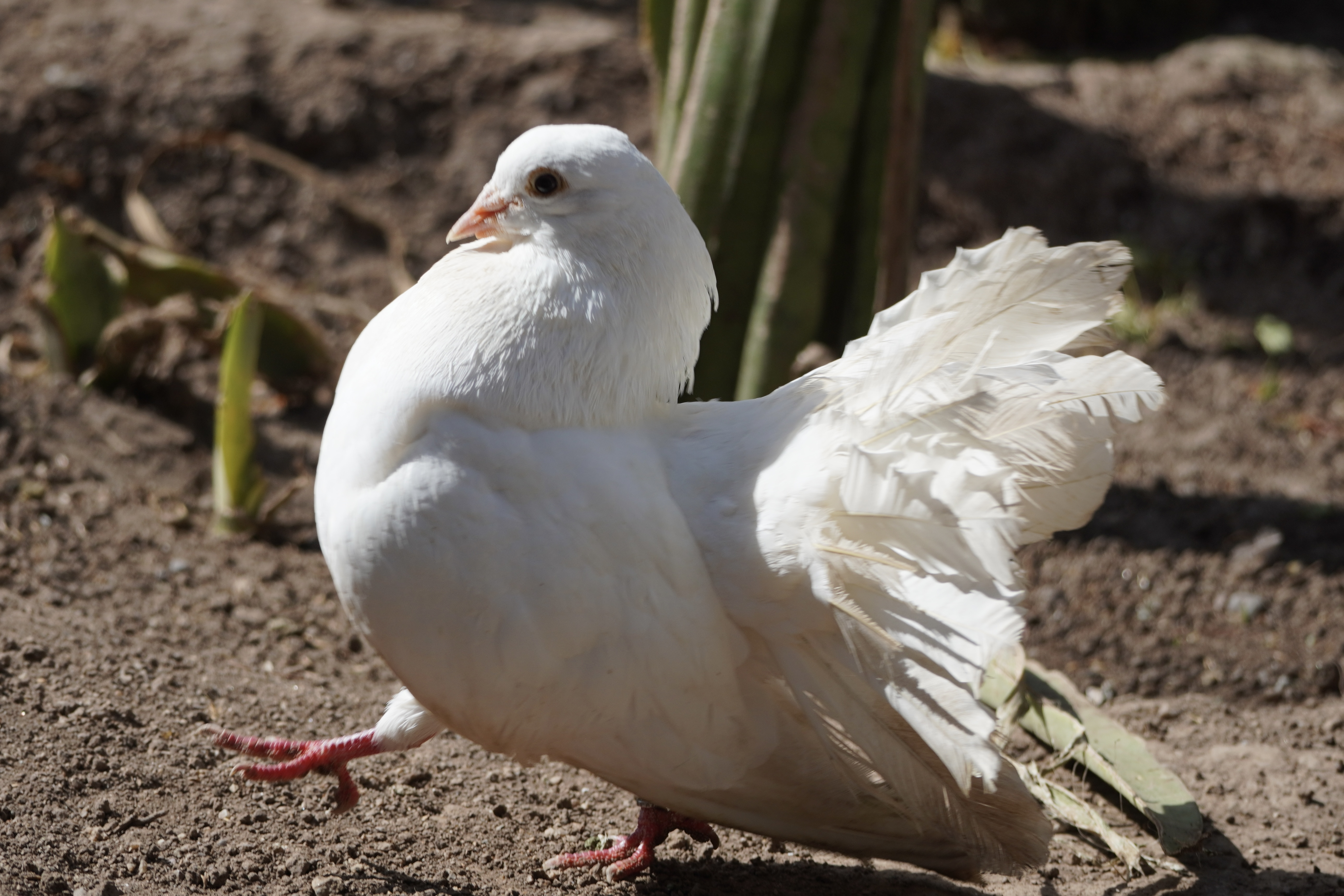
English Fantail
- English Long-faced Tumbler (clean-legged (GB/830) and muffed (GB/831))
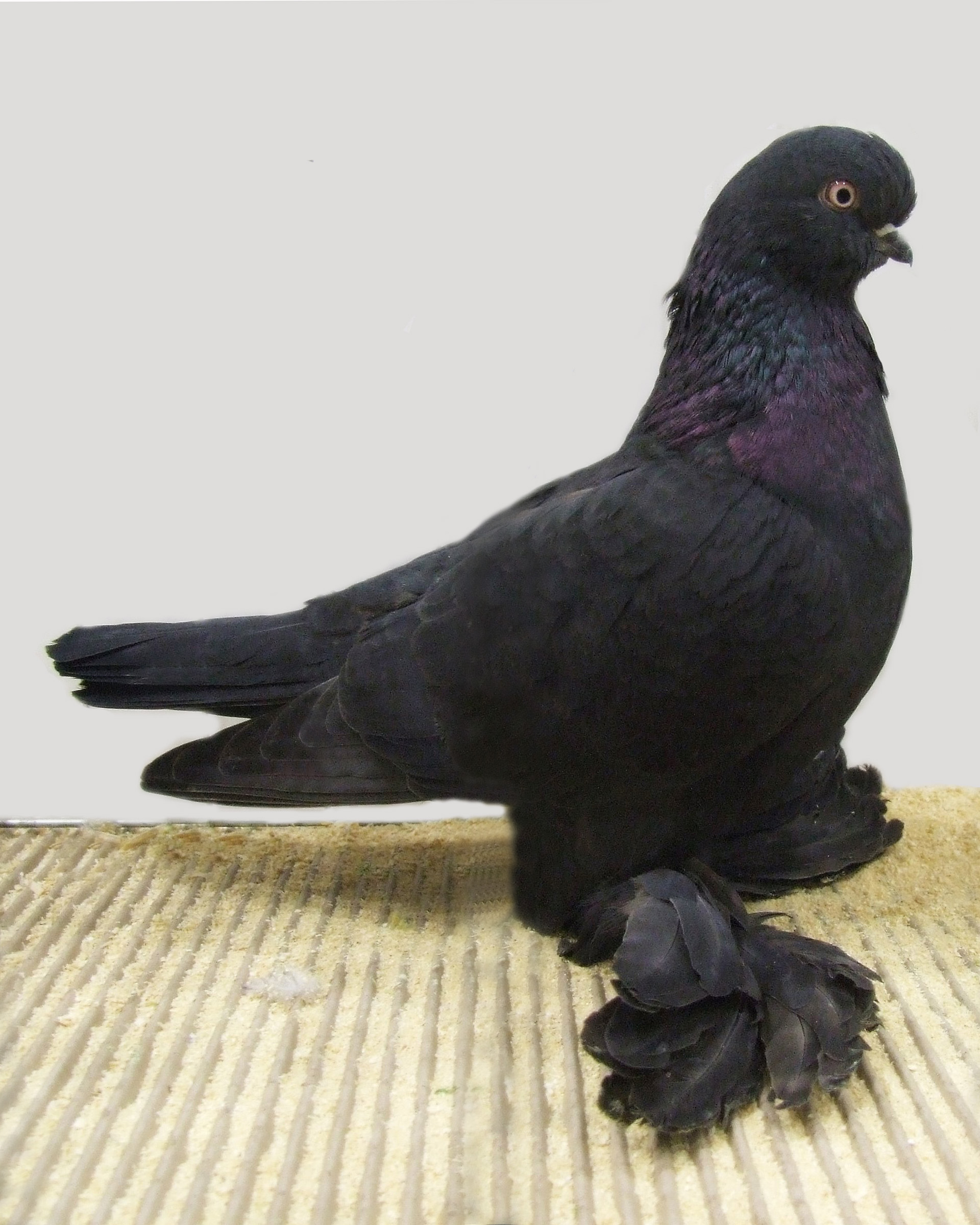
English Long-faced Muffed Black Tumbler

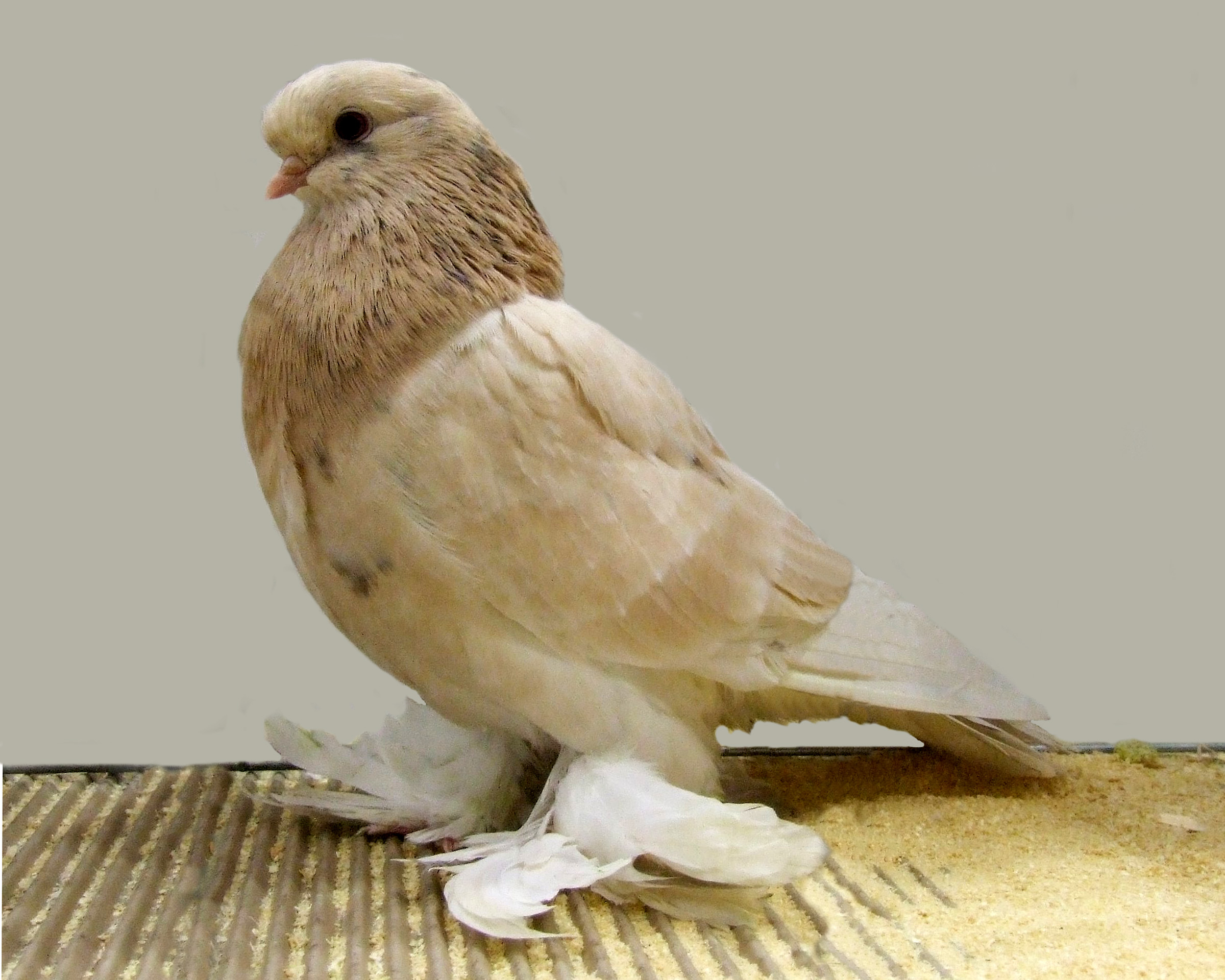
English Long-faced Muffed Yellow Tumbler

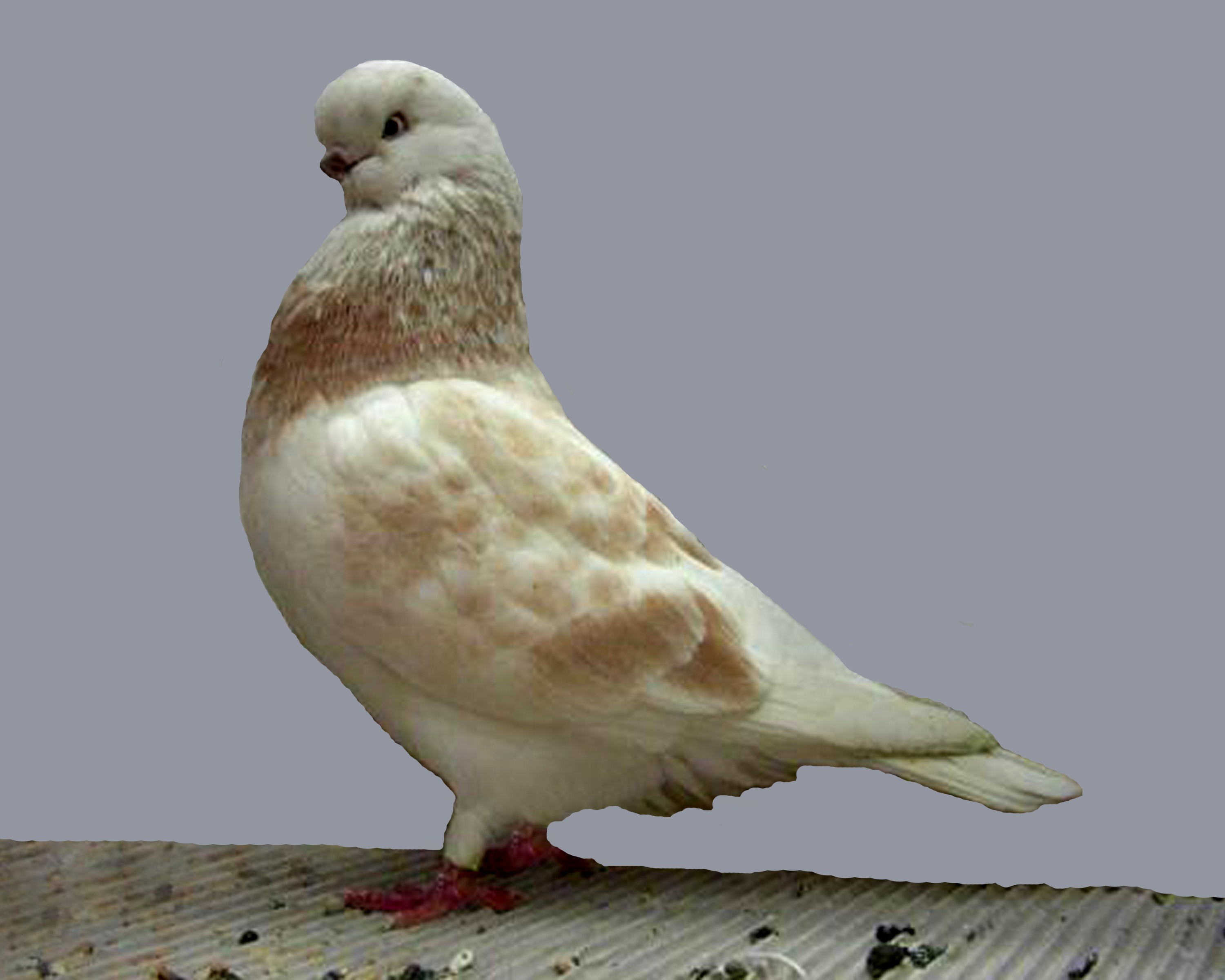
English Long-faced Clean Legged Tumbler

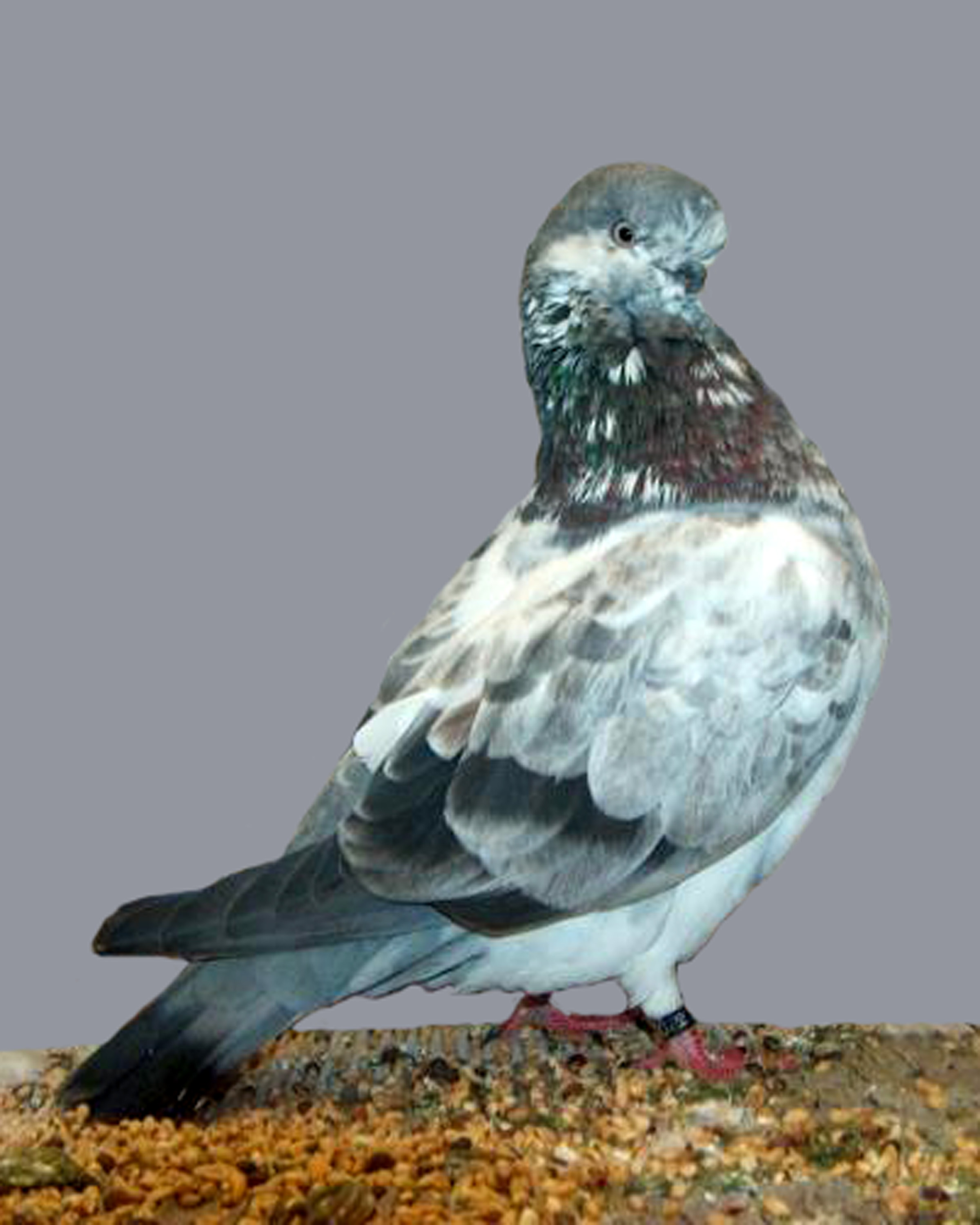
English Long-Faced Clean Legged Blue Grizzle Tumbler
- English Magpie pigeon (GB/807)
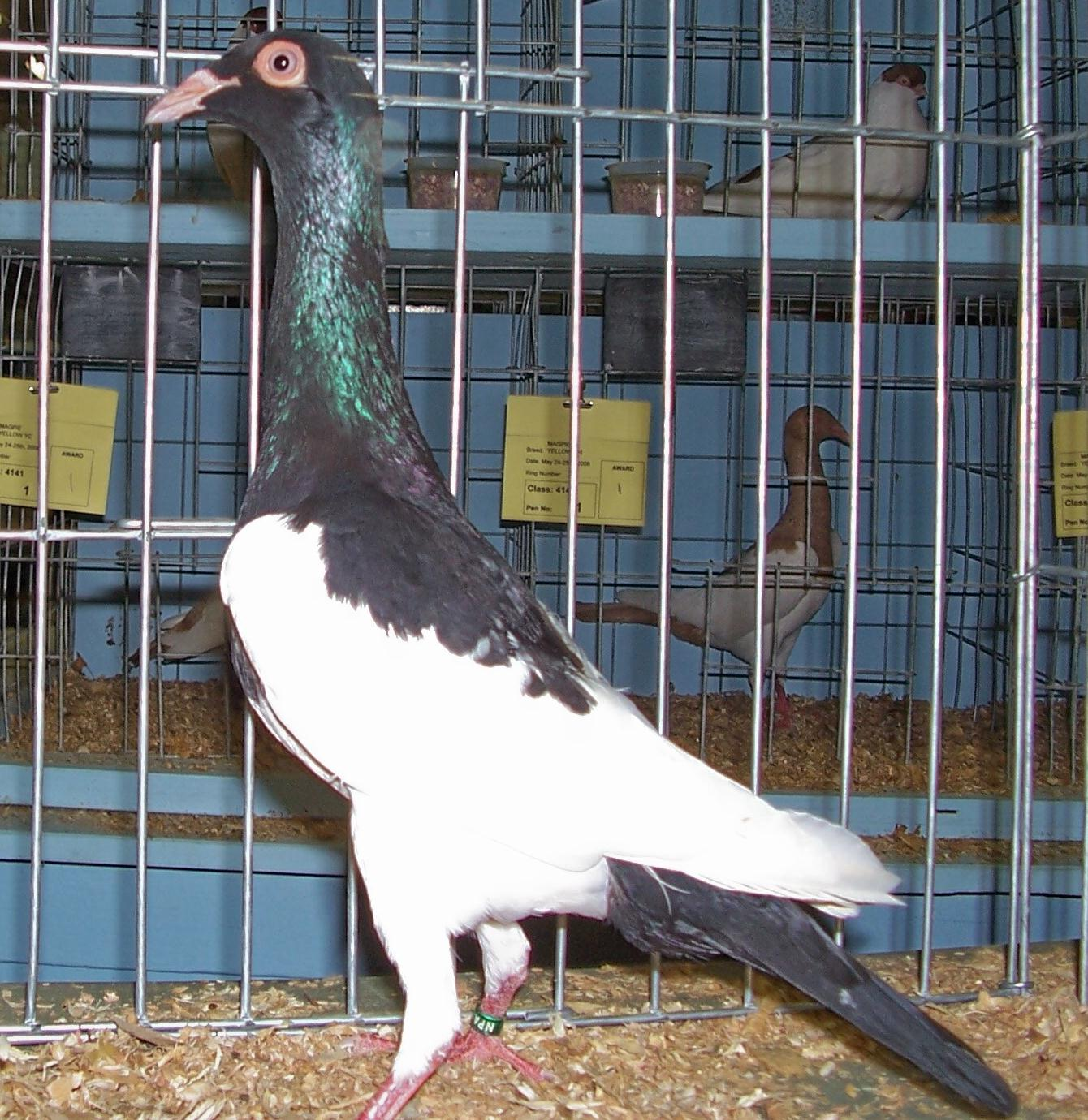
English Magpie
- English Nun (= Nun (GB/896))
- English Owl pigeon (GB/712)
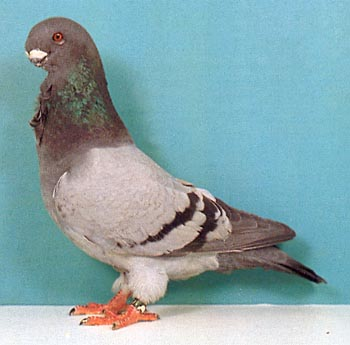
Blue bar English Owl
- English Pouter (GB/310)
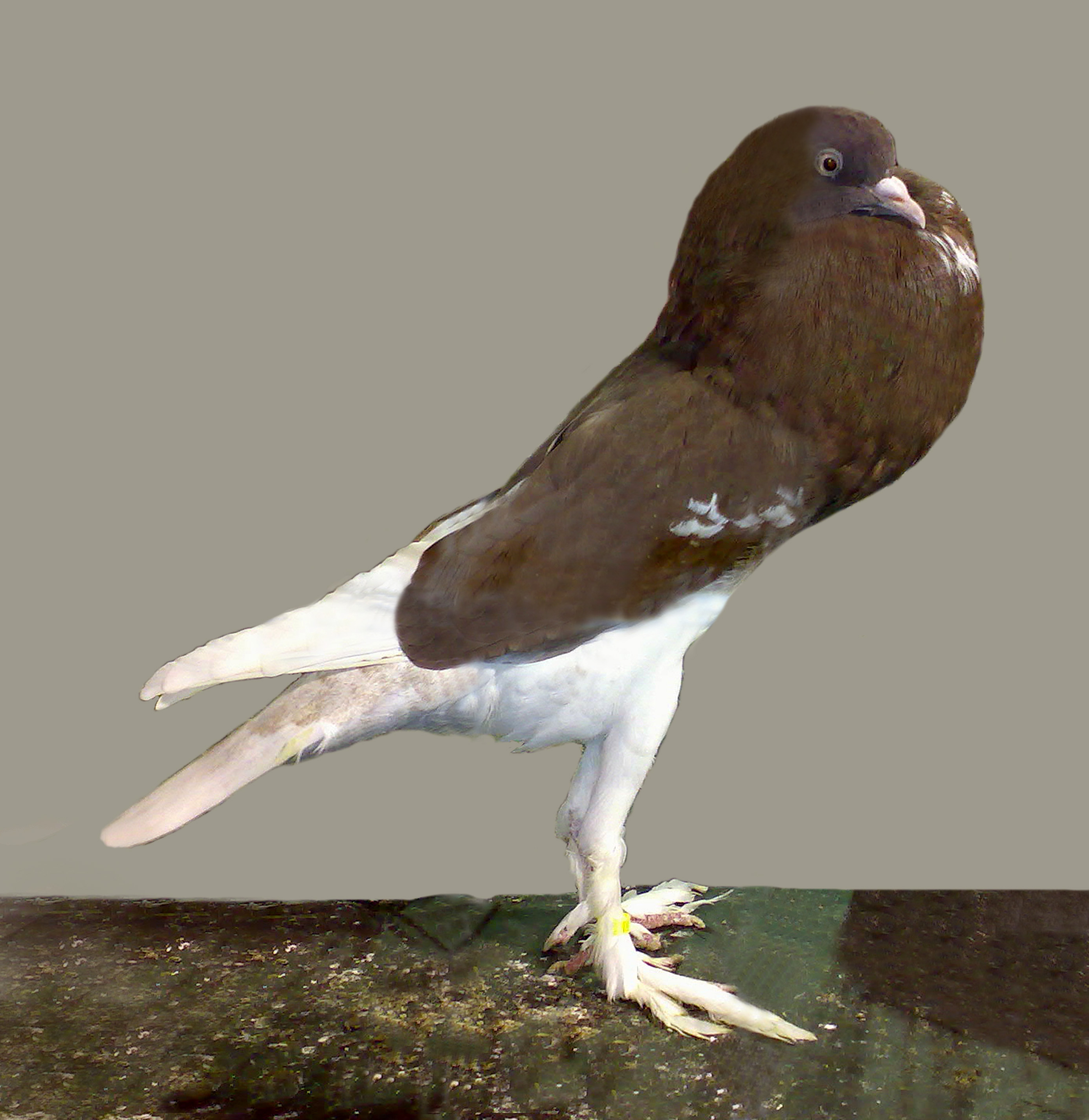
English Pouter
- English Short-faced Tumbler (GB/832)
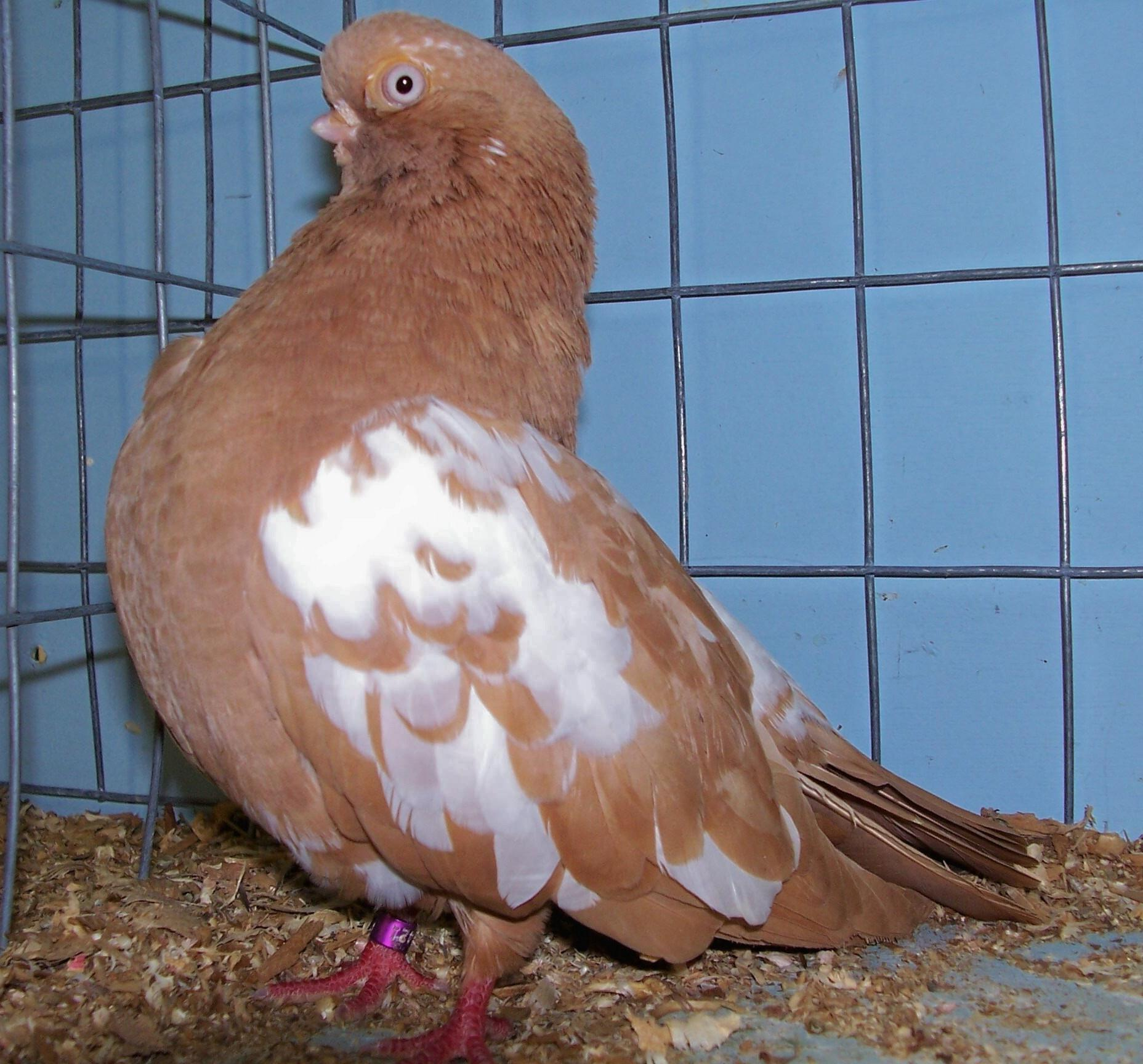
English Short Faced
- English Show Homer (= Show Homer (GB/027))
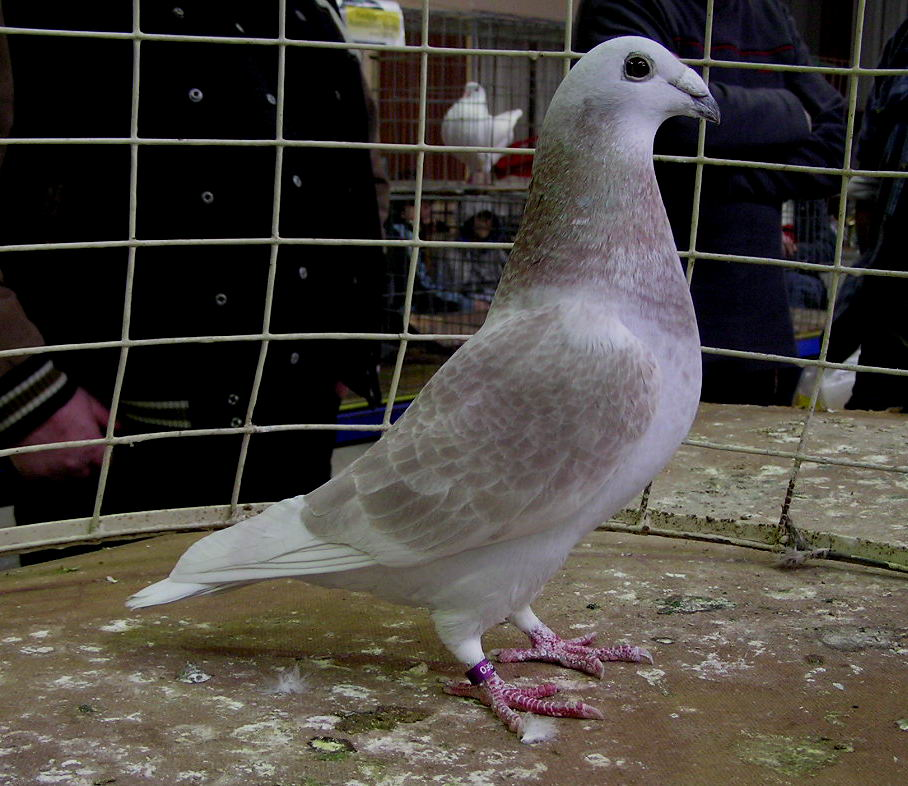
British Show Homer Red Check
- English Show Tippler (GB/829) →
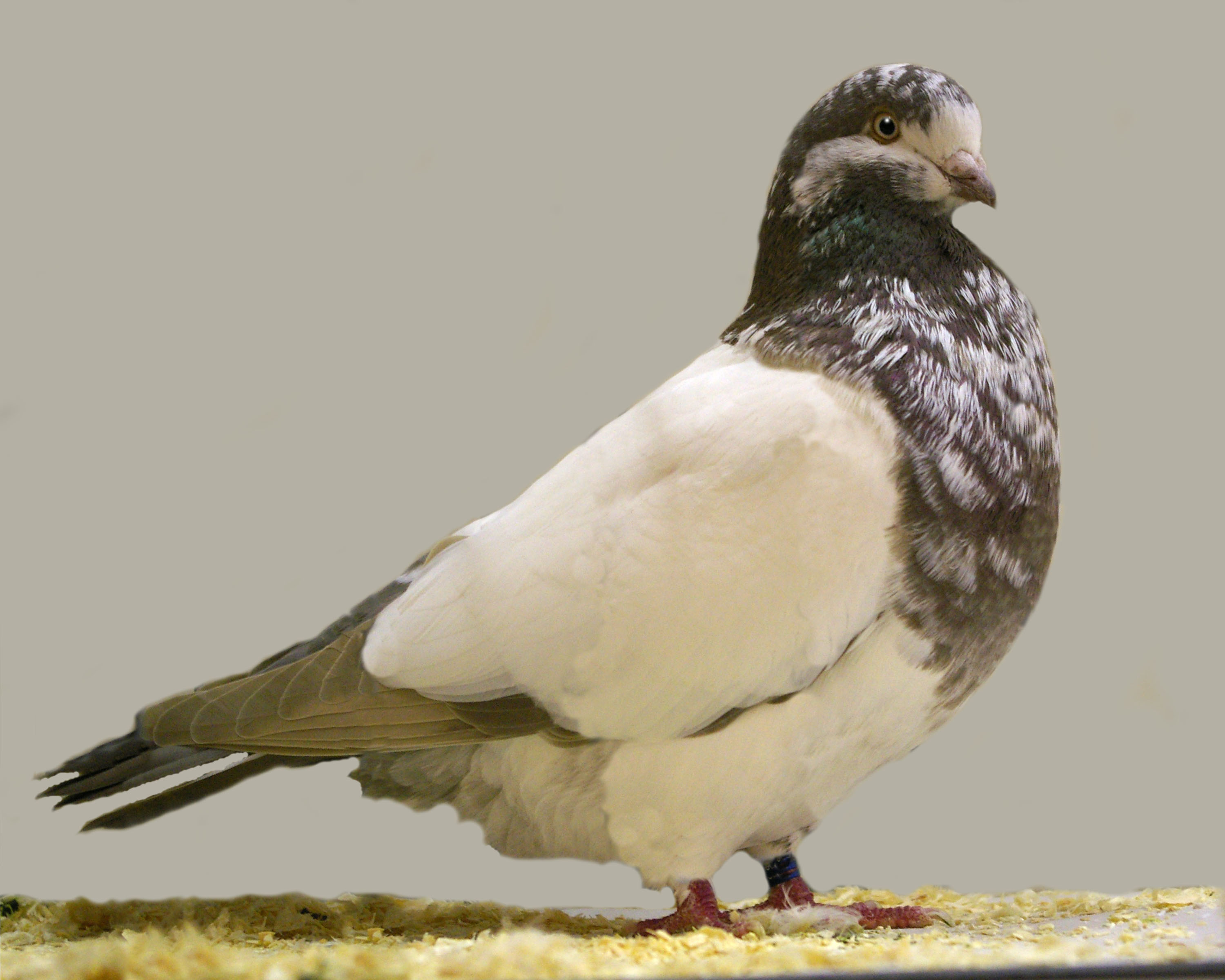
English/Scottish Tippler

Tippler

- English Trumpeter (ESKT/508)
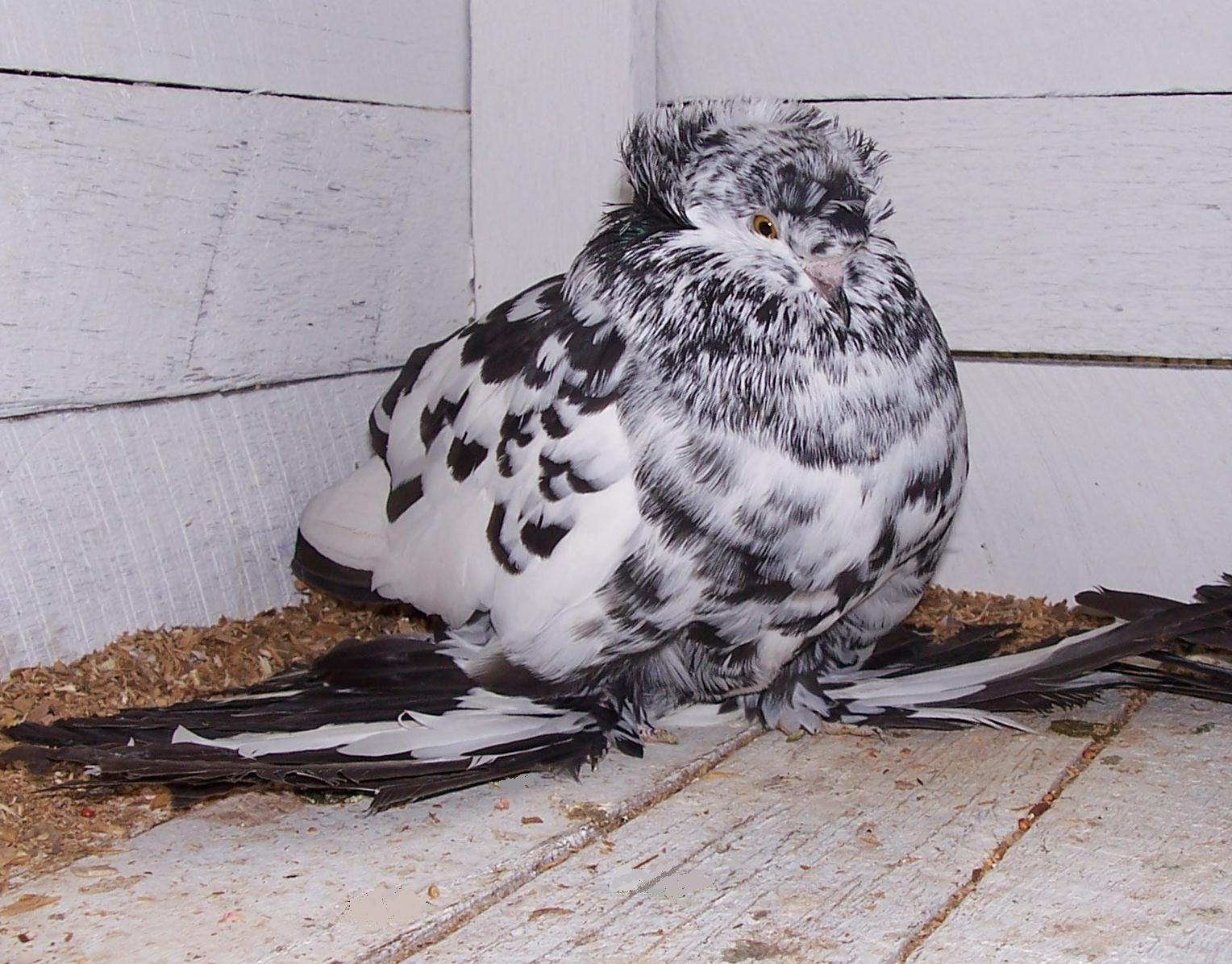
English Trumpeter
- Erlau Tumbler (H/860)
- Escampadissa Tumbler (E/923)
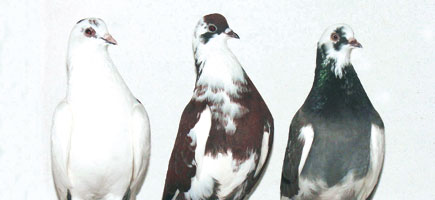
Escampadissa Tumbler
- Exhibition Flying Tippler (GB/919) → Tippler
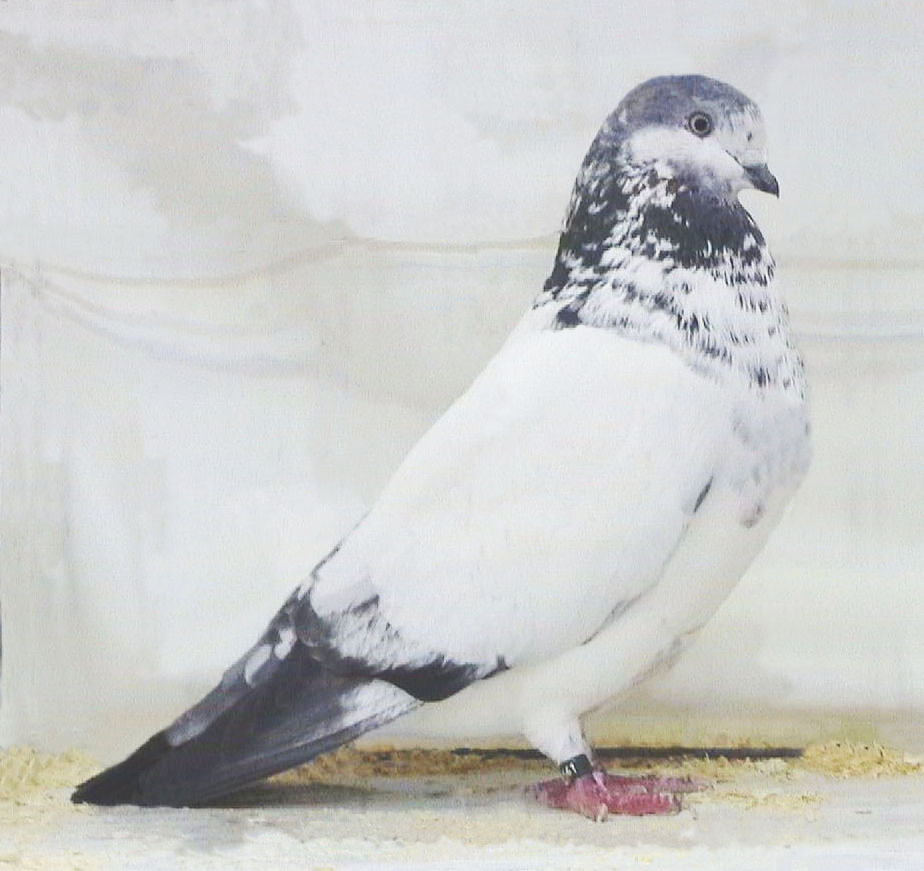
Grizzled Tippler

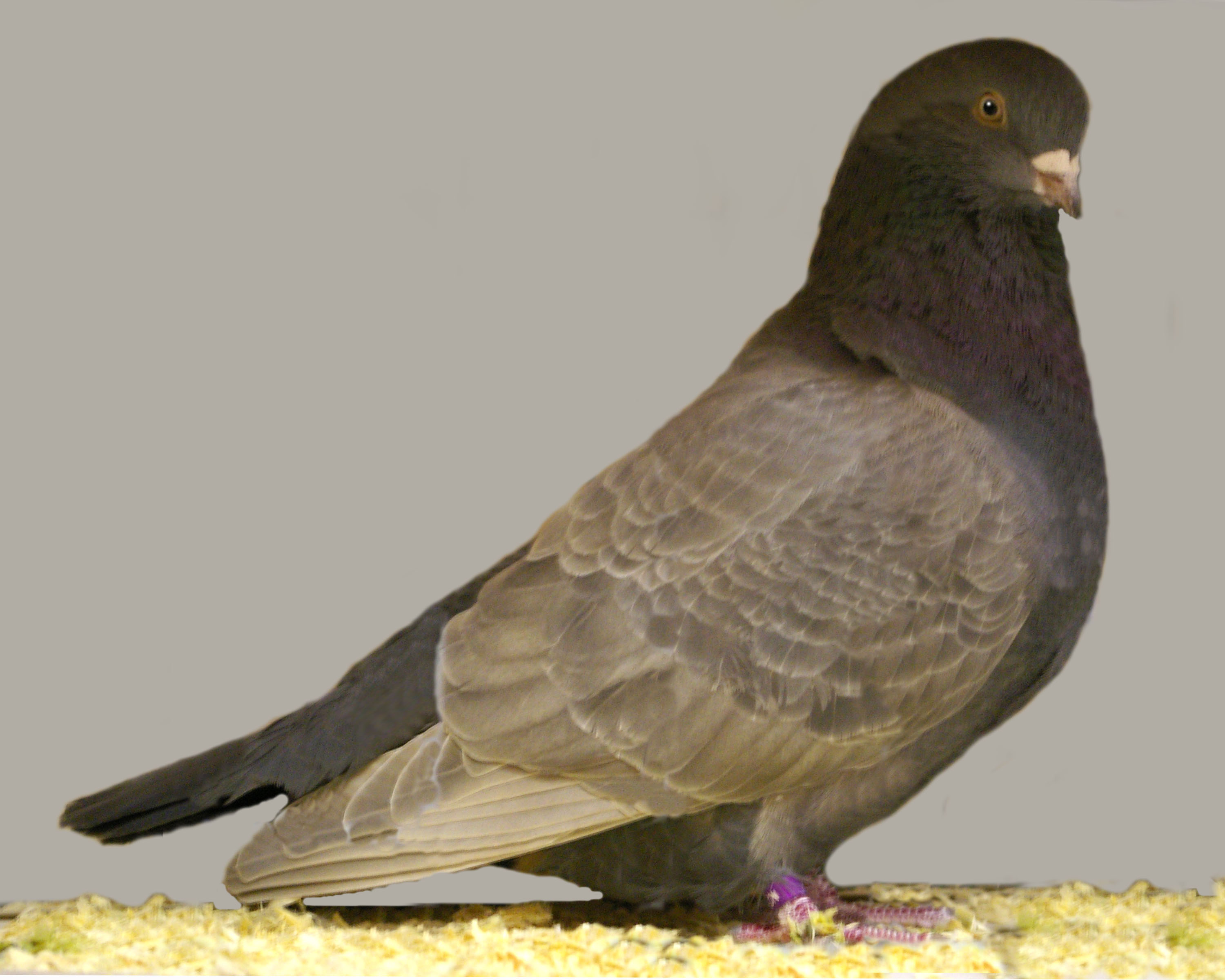
Dun Tippler
- Exhibition Homer (GB/028)
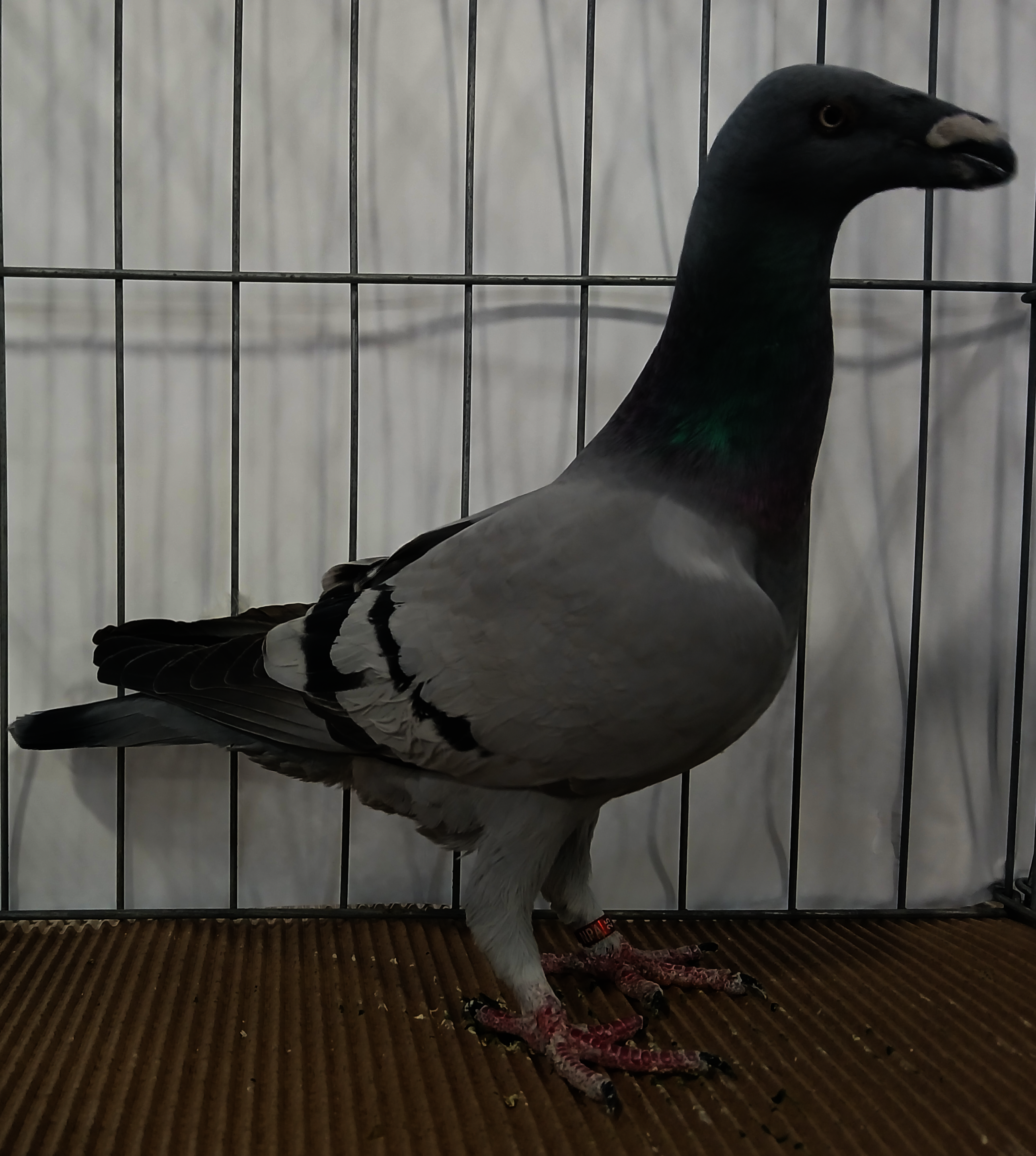
Exhibition Homer

== F ==
- Fantail (GB/606)
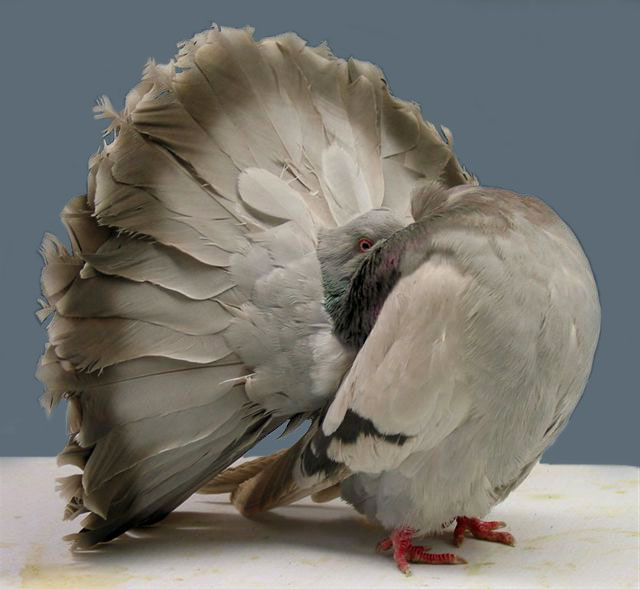
Fantail Blue Bar

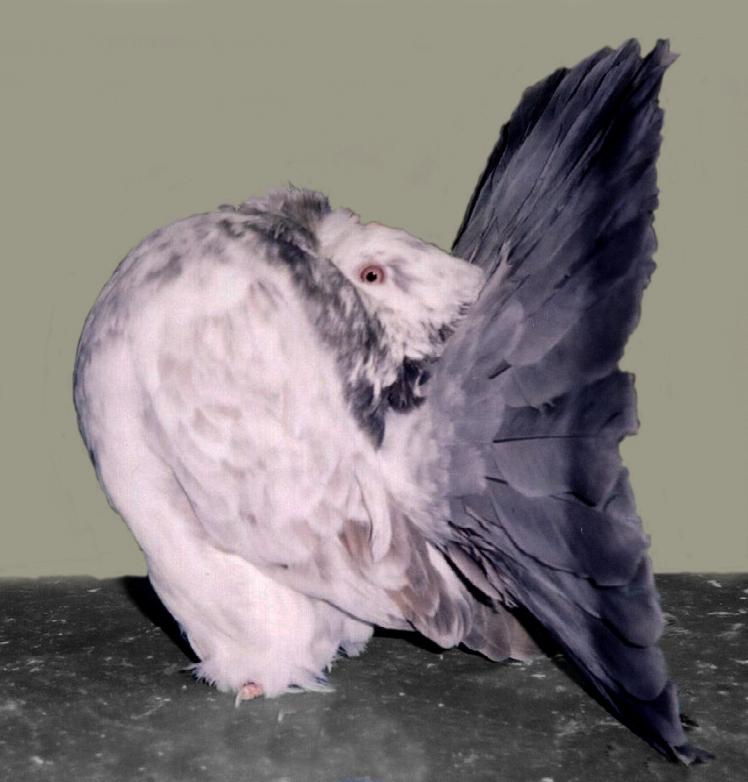
Fantail Blue Grizzle

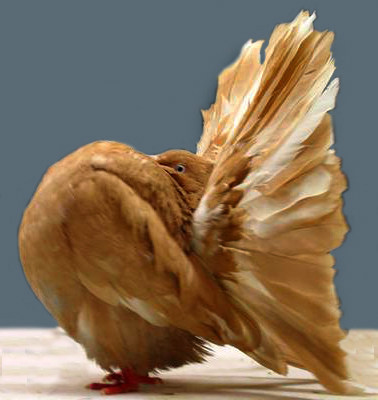
Fantail Yellow

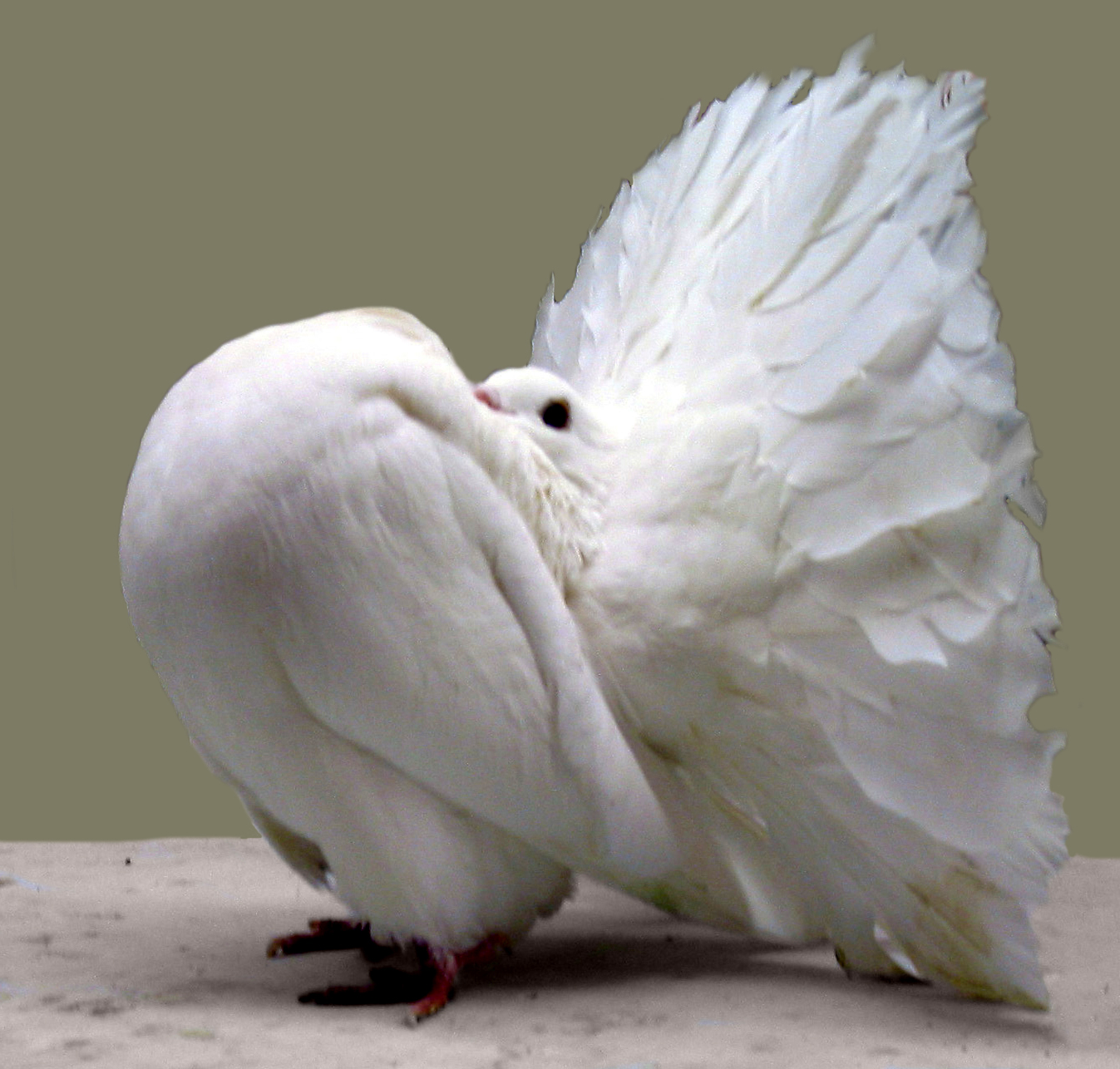
Fantail White

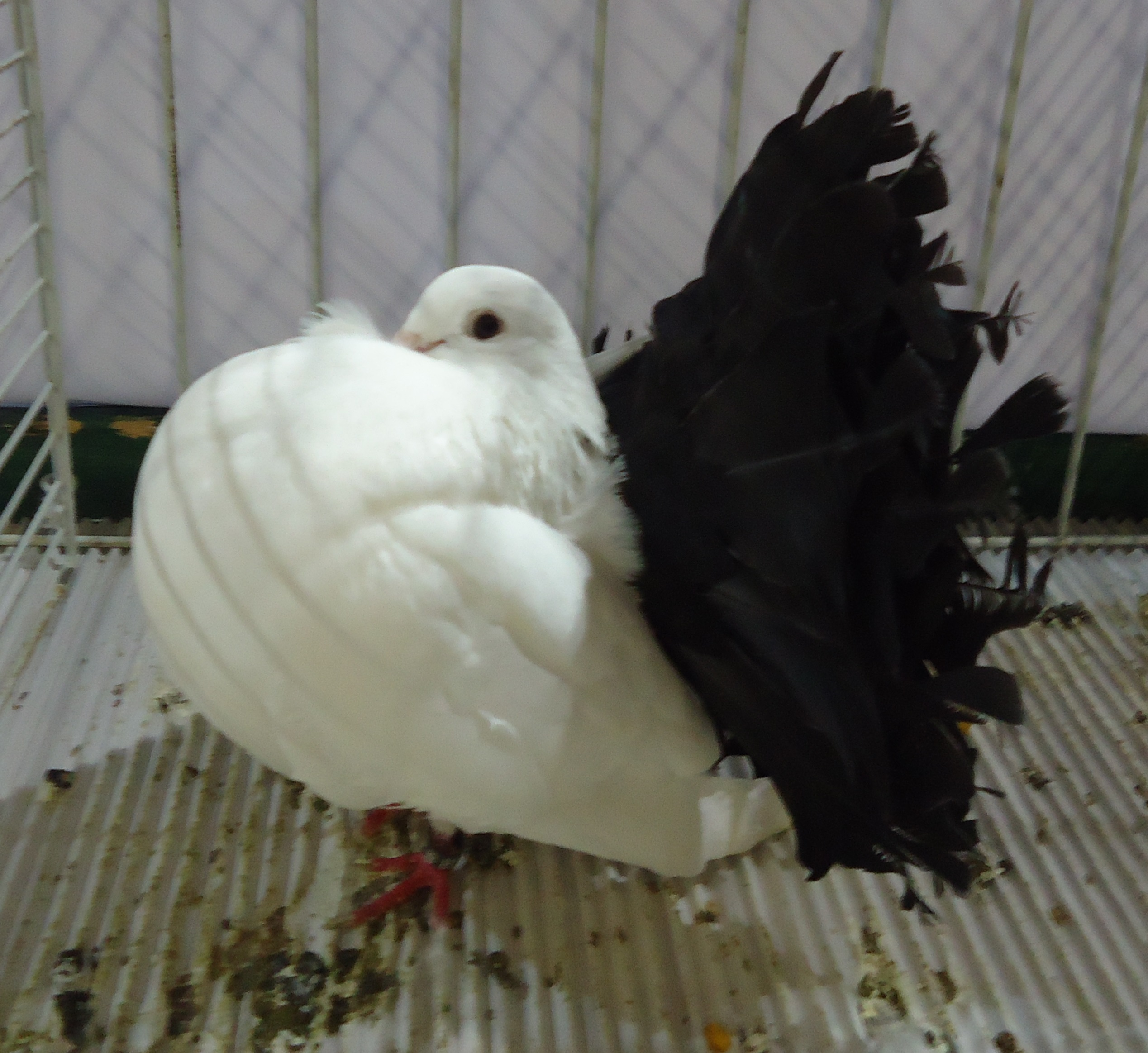
Fantail Black Tail
- Fat Shan Blue
- Félegyháza Tumbler (H/858)
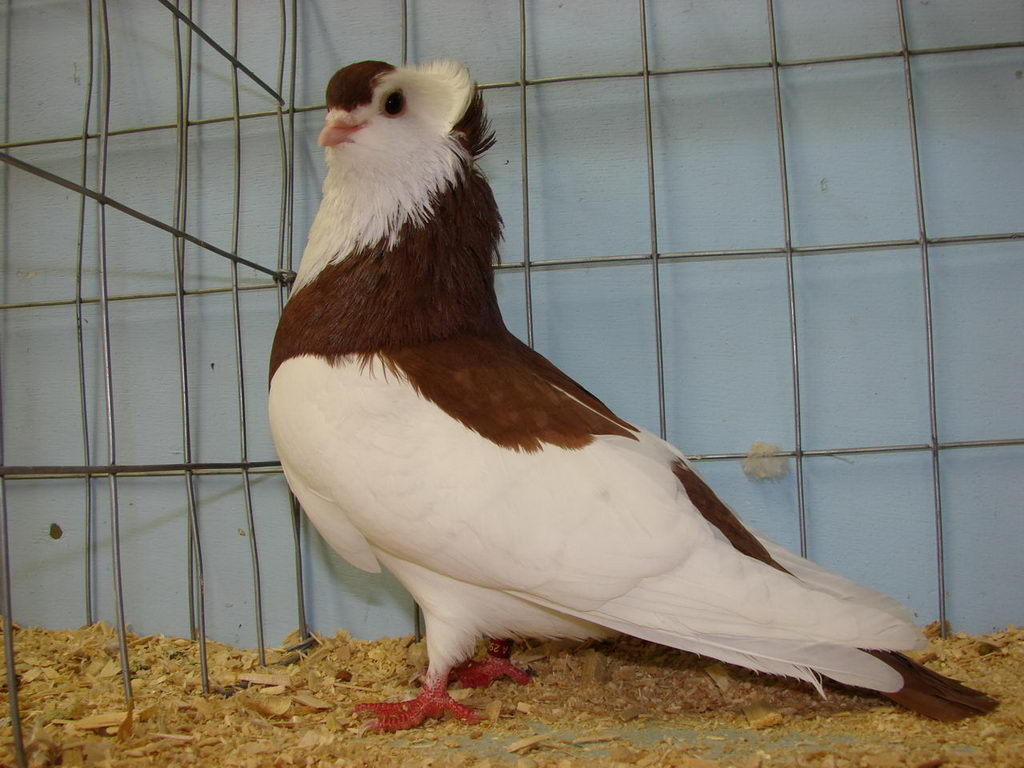
Red Felegahazer Tumbler
- Field Pigeon (D/444) (= Franconian Field Pigeon)
- Field Pigeon, clean-legged (D/406)
- Figurita (E/7) = Valencian Figurita
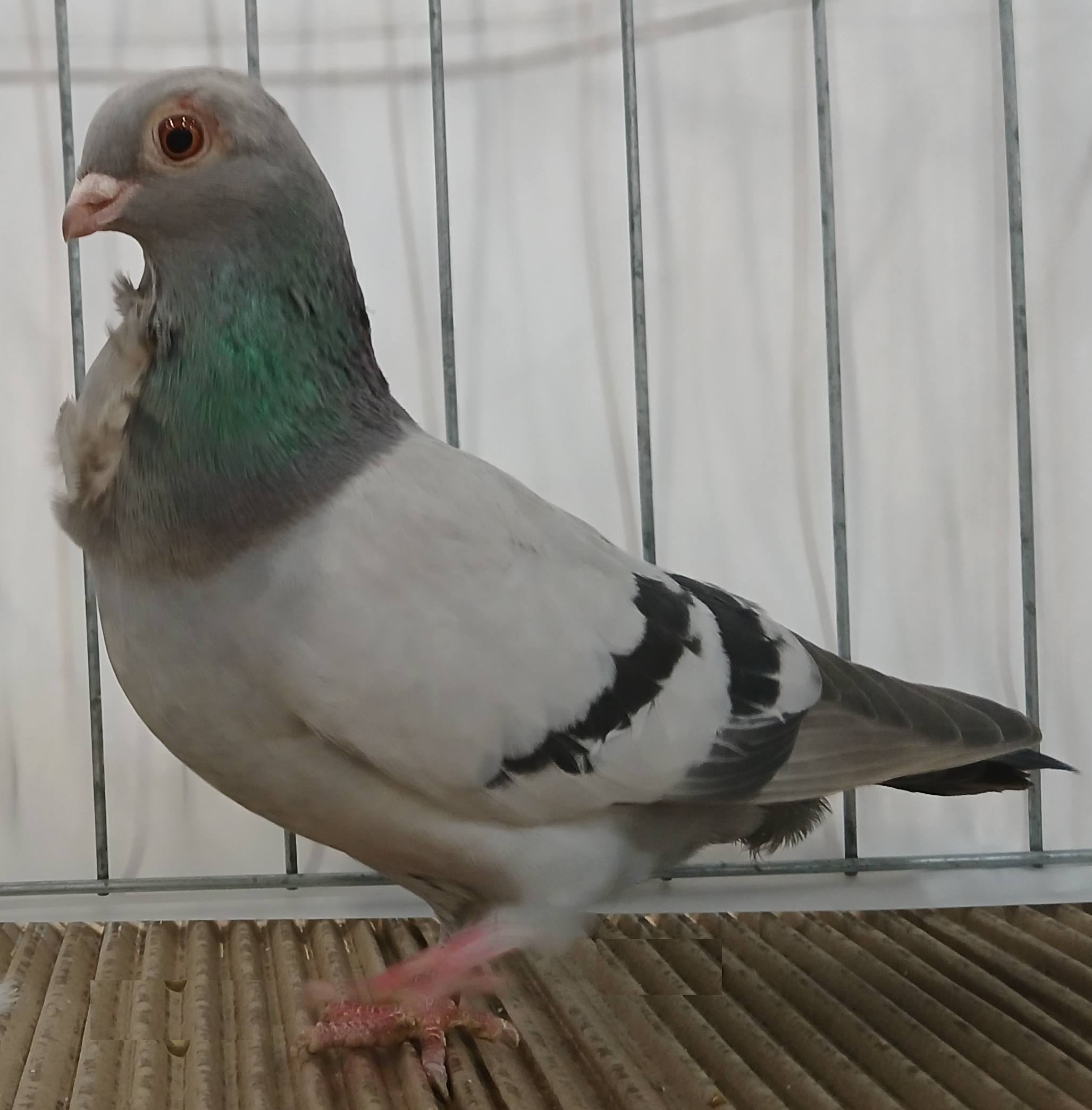
Figurita blue bar
- Fish Eye Roller
- Flanders Smerle (B/702)
- Florentine (I/201)
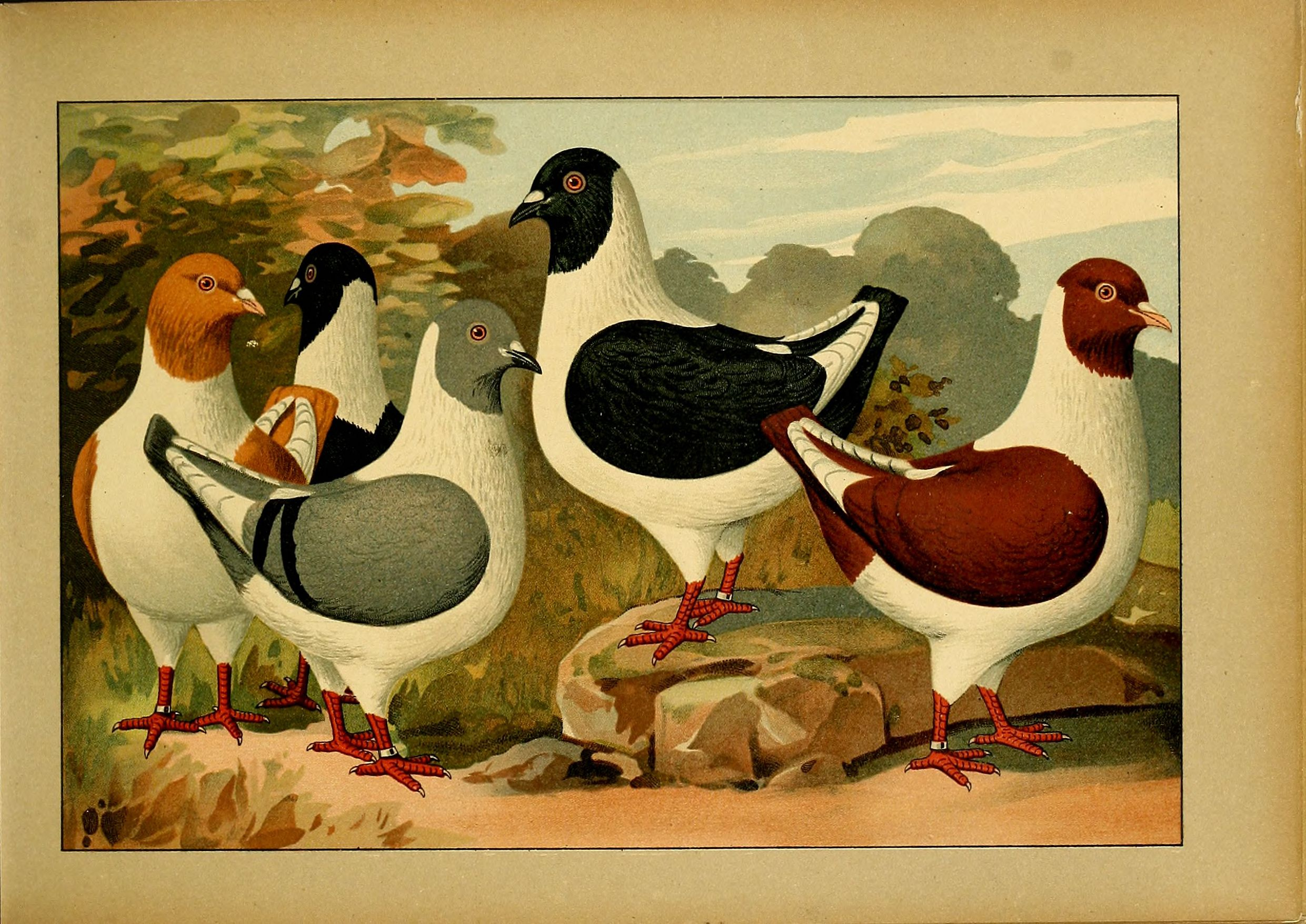
Schachtzabel_1906_Tafel_05 Florentine
- Flying Oriental Roller (=Oriental Roller)
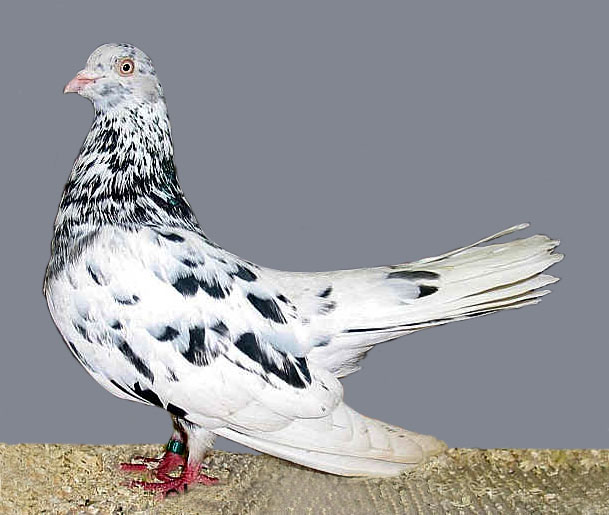
Grizzle Oriental Roller
- Flying Performing Roller
- Flying Saddle Homer
- Flying Tippler
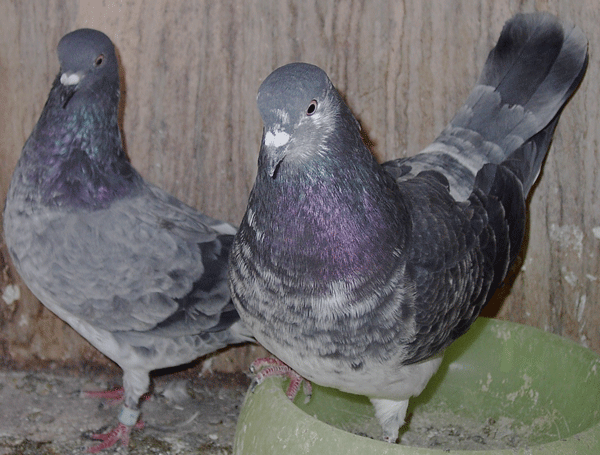
Flying Tipplers
- Fork-tailed
- Franconian Bagdad (D/106)
- Franconian Field Pigeon (= Field Pigeon (D/444))
- Franconian Magpie pigeon (D/445)
- Franconian Toy Self
- Franconian Trumpeter (D/512)
- Franconian Velvet Shield (D/449)
- French Bagdad (B/107)
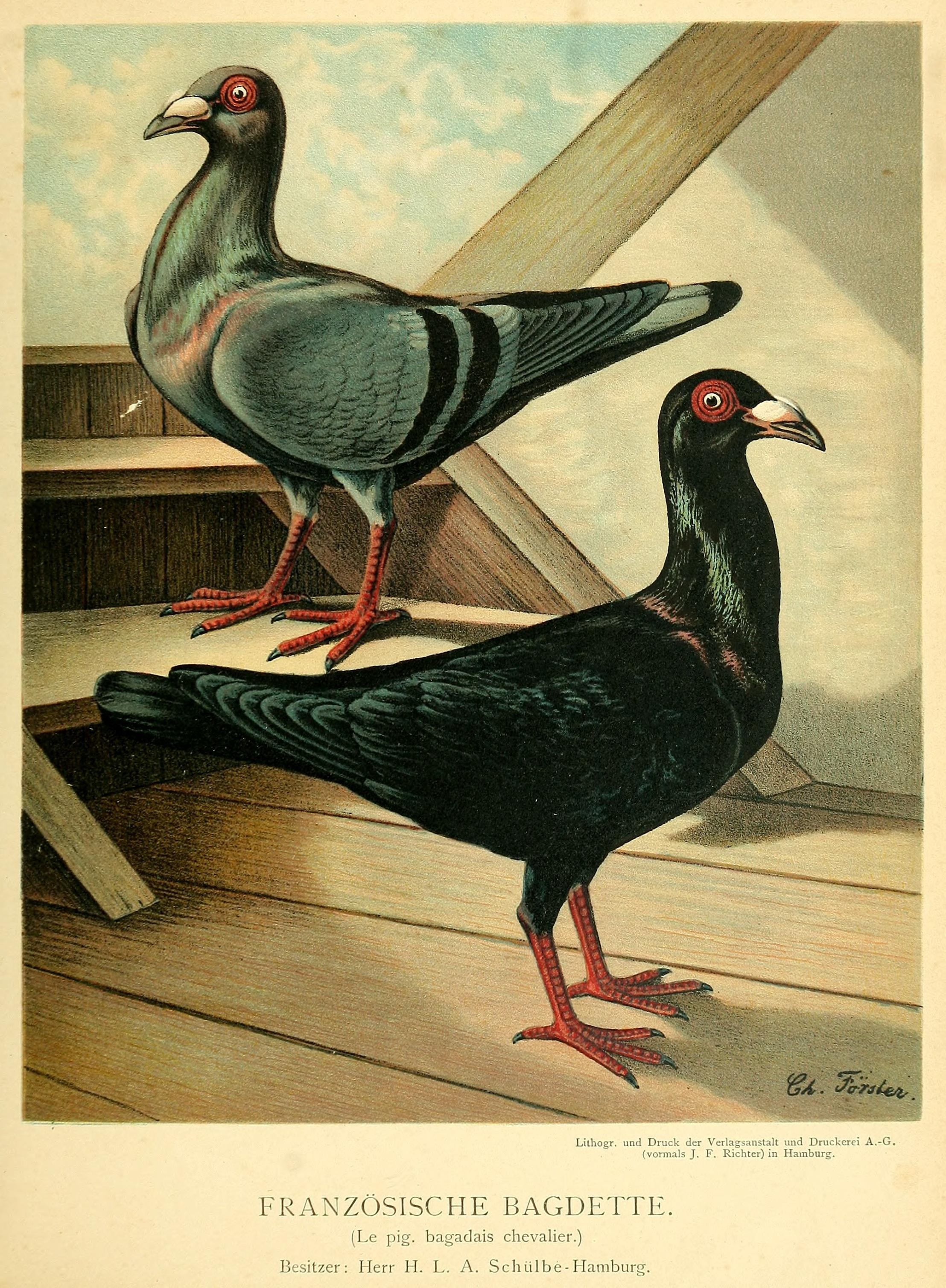
Illustrirtes_Mustertauben-Buch Plate 29
- French Highflyer (F/884)
- French Krymka Tumbler (F/971)
- French Mondain (F/006)
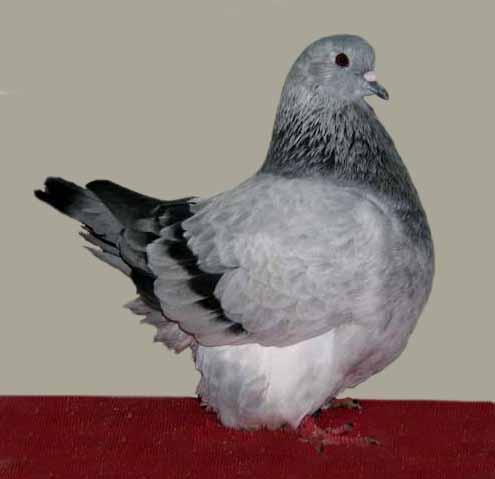
Blue grizzled French Mondain
- French Owl pigeon (F/717)
- French Pouter (B/307)
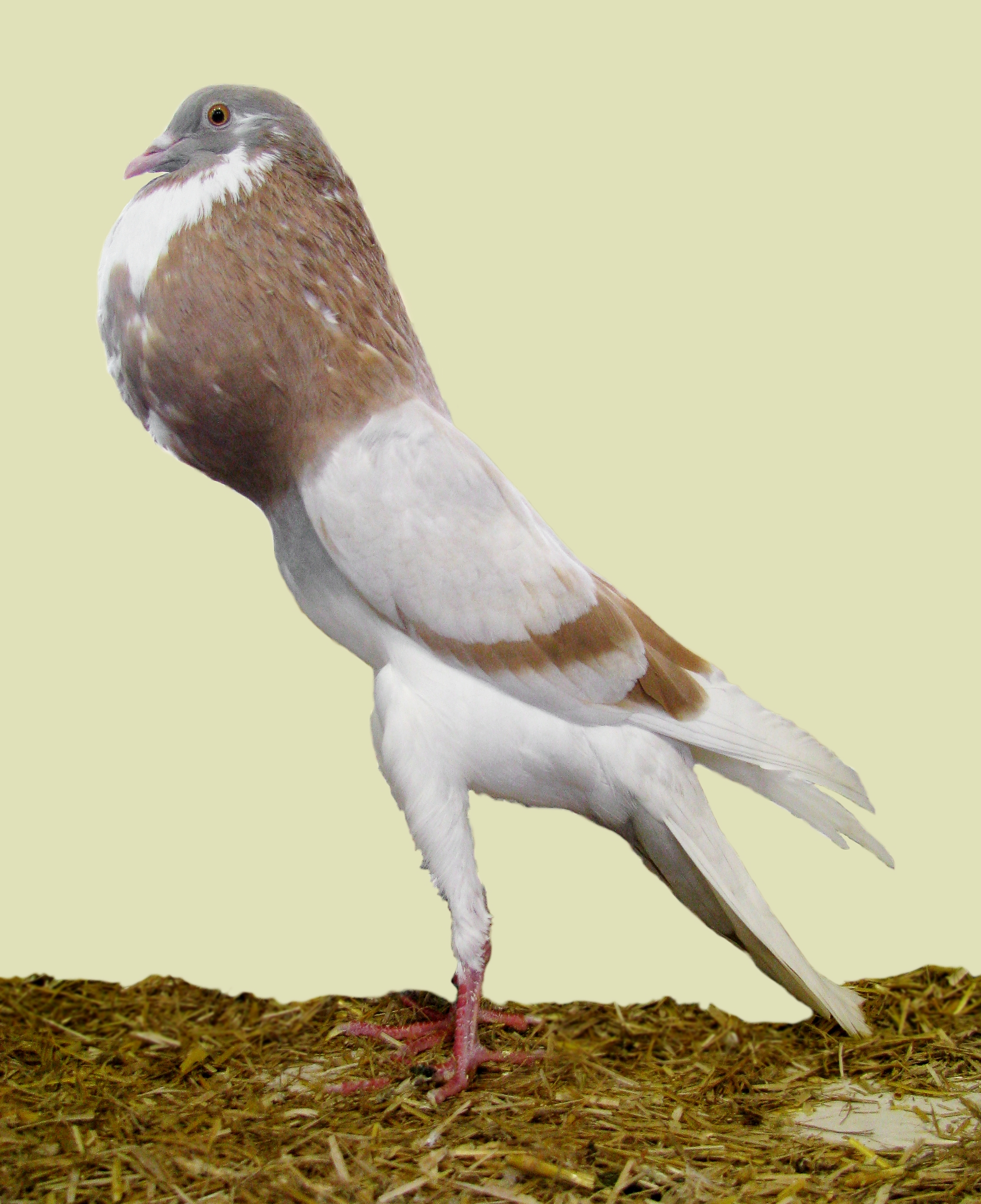
Cream bar French Pouter

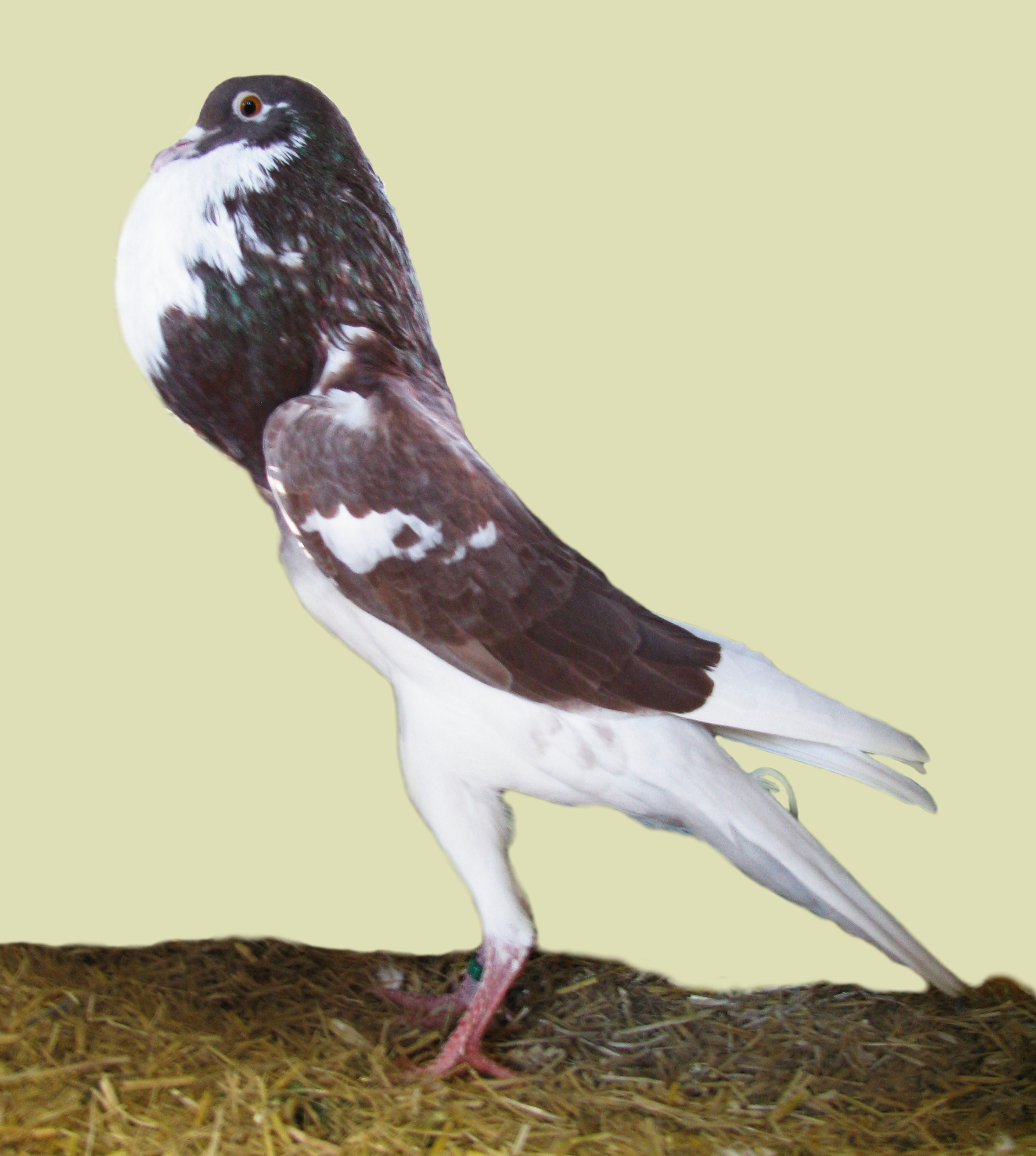
Red French Pouter
- French Sottobanca (F/020)
- French Tumbler (F/883)
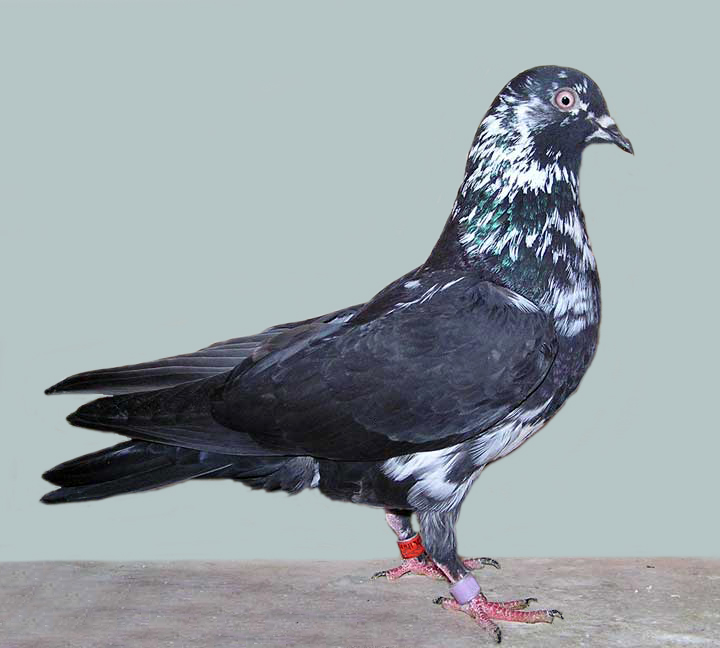
Black grizzled French Tumbler
- Frillback (D/601)
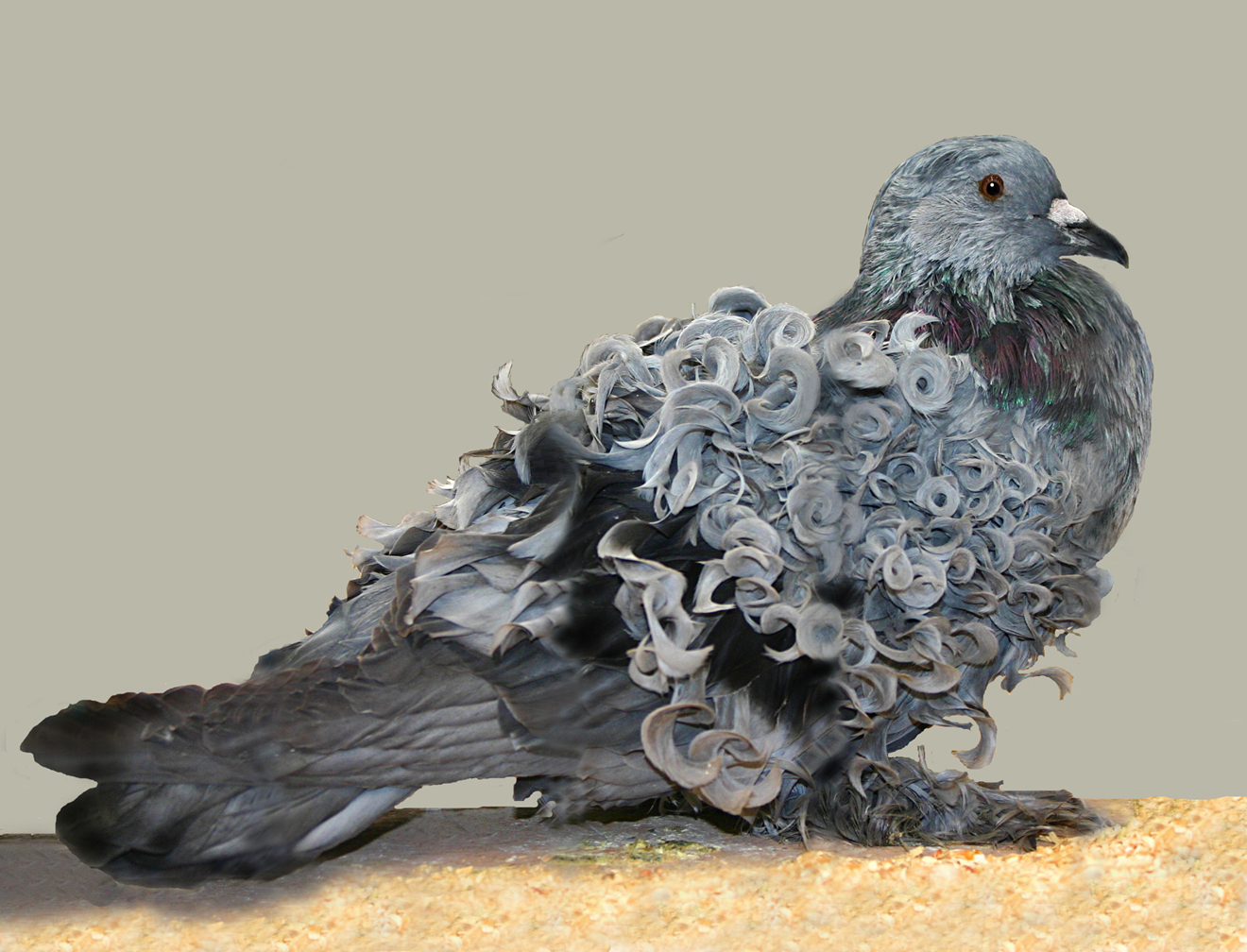
Frillback

== G ==
- Gaditano Pouter (= Gaditano Cropper (E/337))
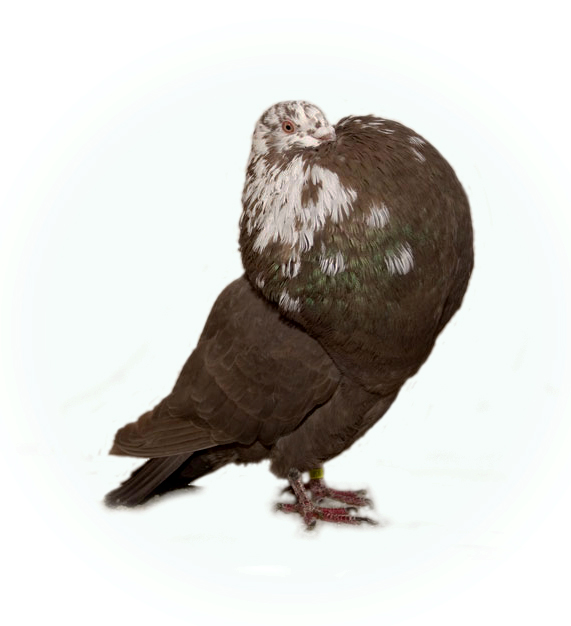
Gaditano Cropper
- Galatz Roller (RO/974)
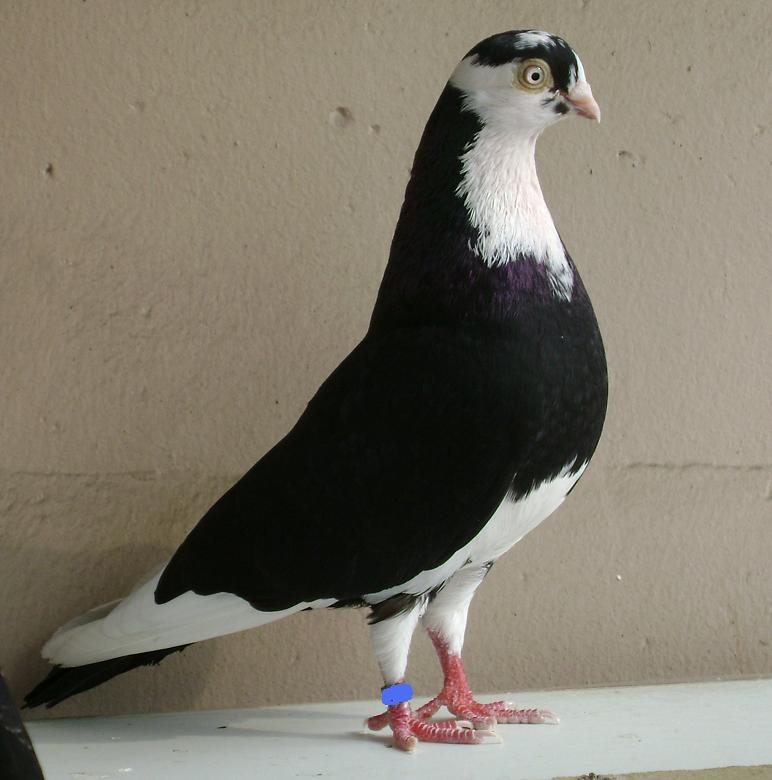
Galaţi Roller
- Garden Fantail (GB/608) (= English Fantail)
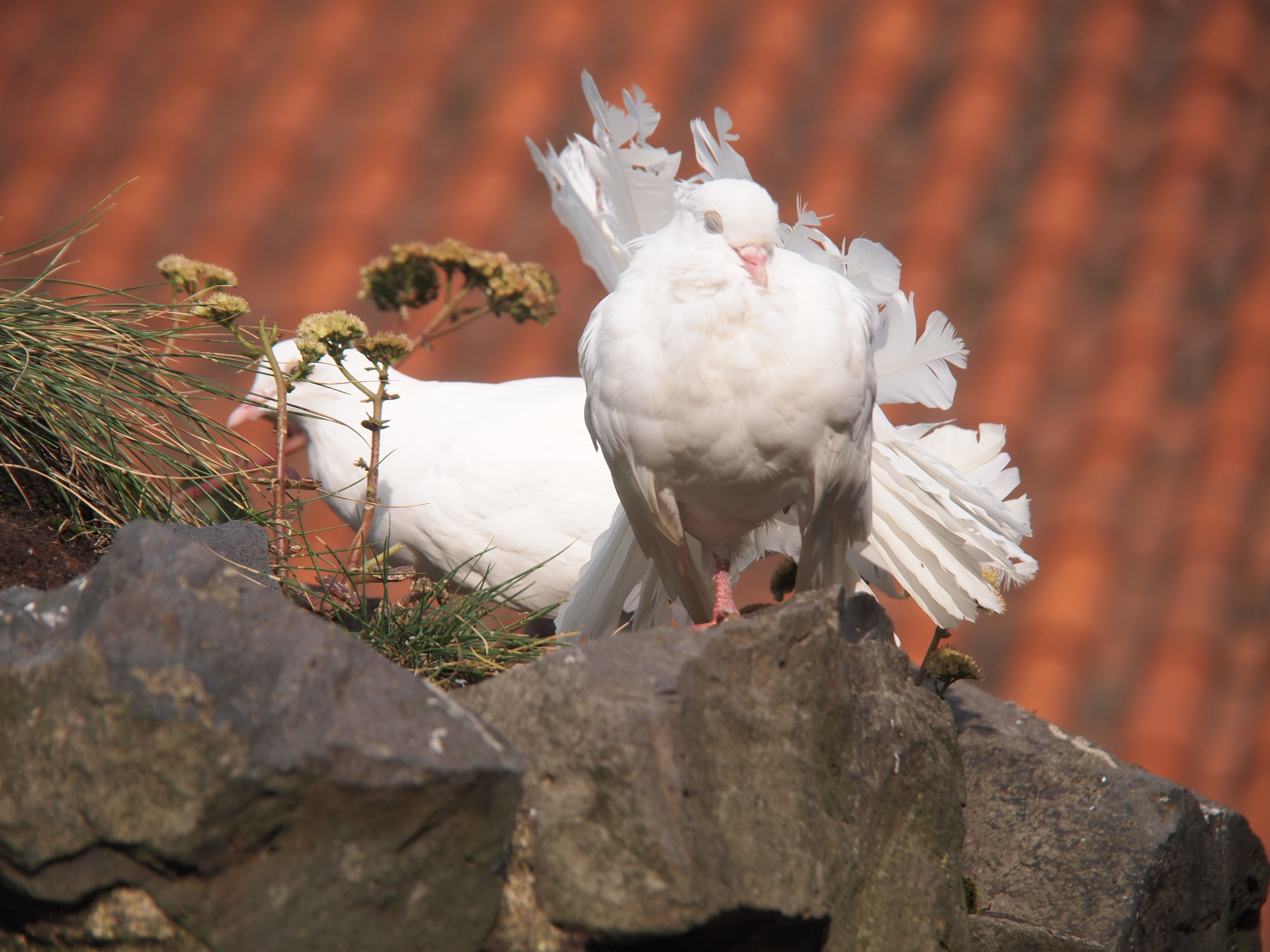
White English Garden Fantail
- Gascogne Pigeon (F/014)
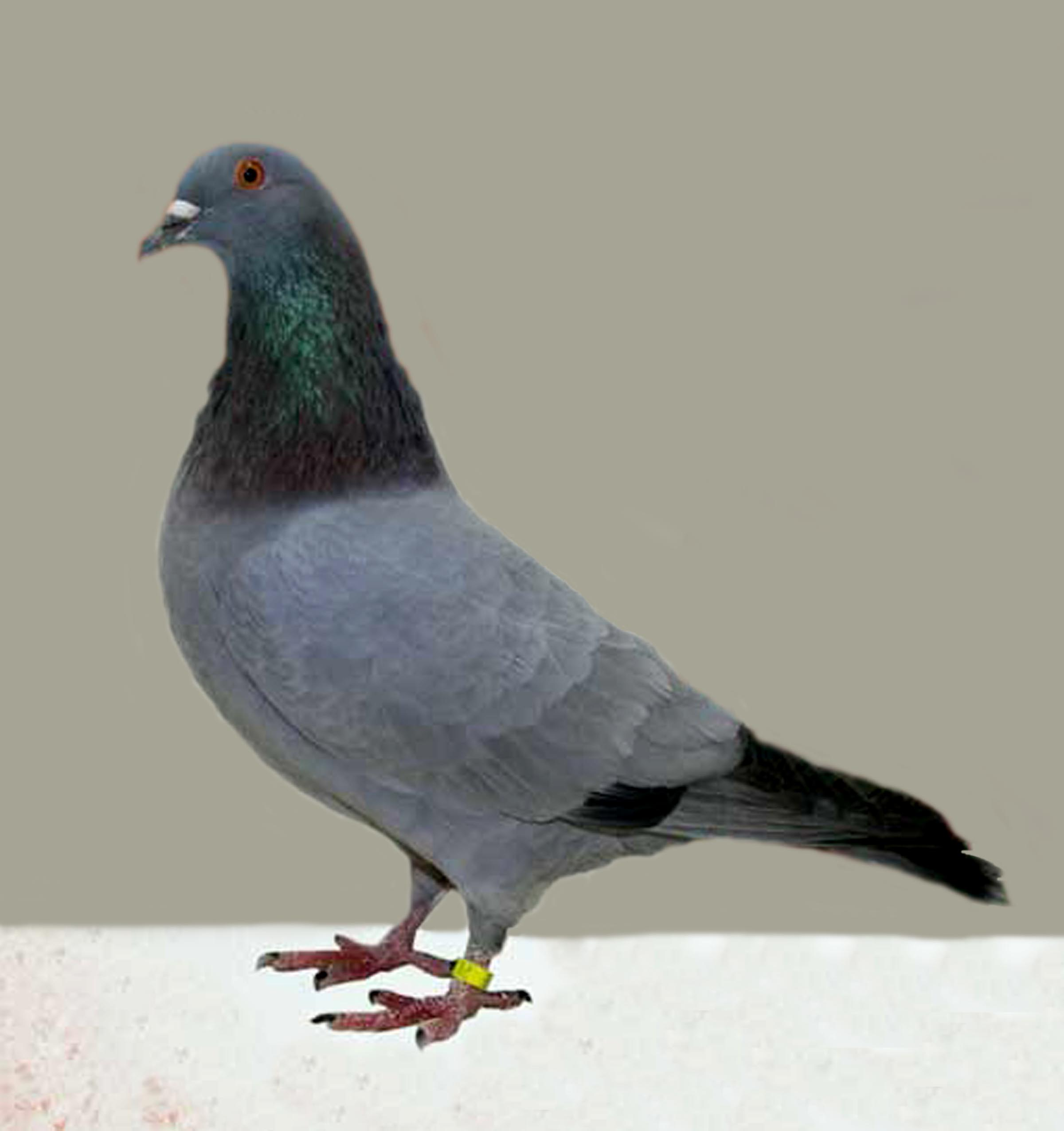
Blue barless Gascogne
- Gelderland Slenke (NL/1106)
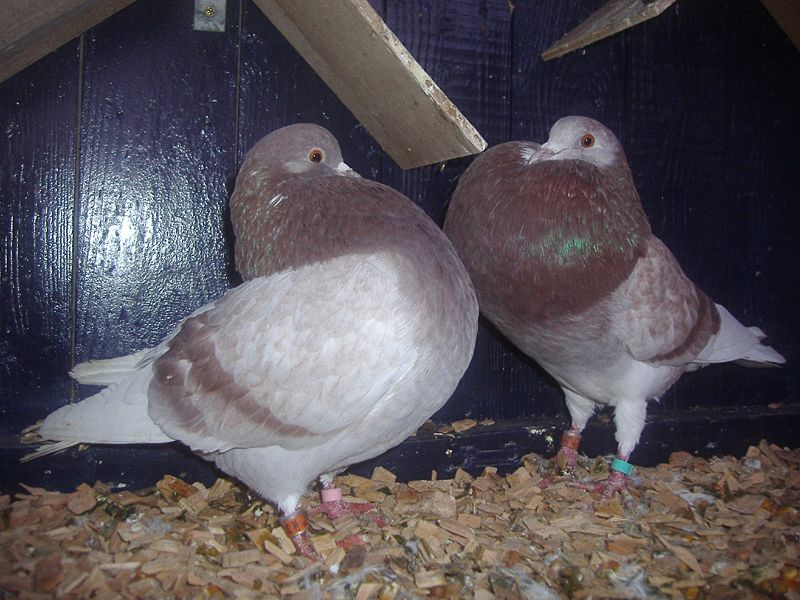
Gelderse Slenke
- Genuine Homer (GB/029)
- Georgian Black-tailed, Yellow-tailed, Red-tailed, White-tailed
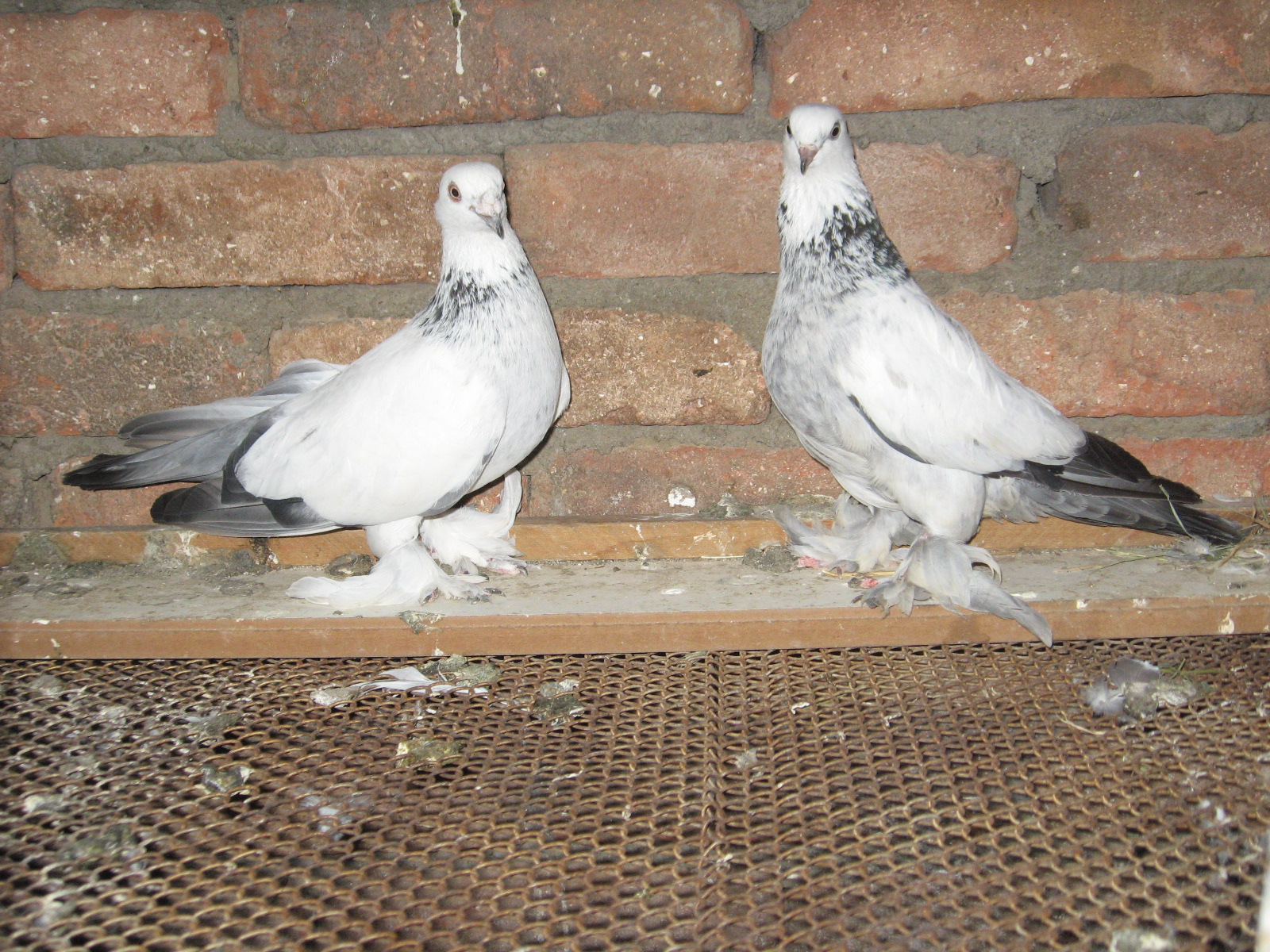
Black tailed Georgian
- Georgian Sizaghrani
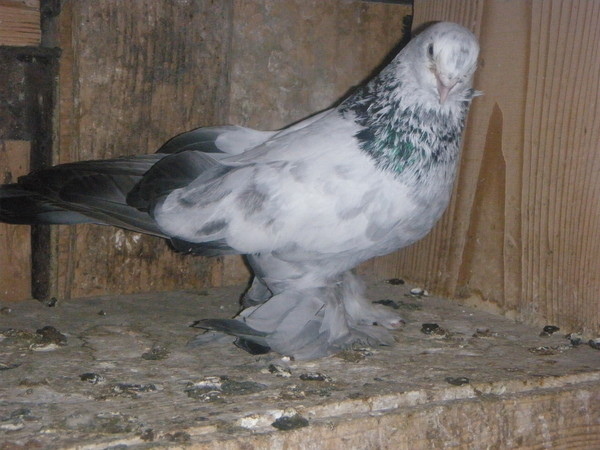
Gerogain Sizaghrani
- Georgian Kuduli
- German Barb (D/103)
- German Beak-crested Trumpeter (D/503)
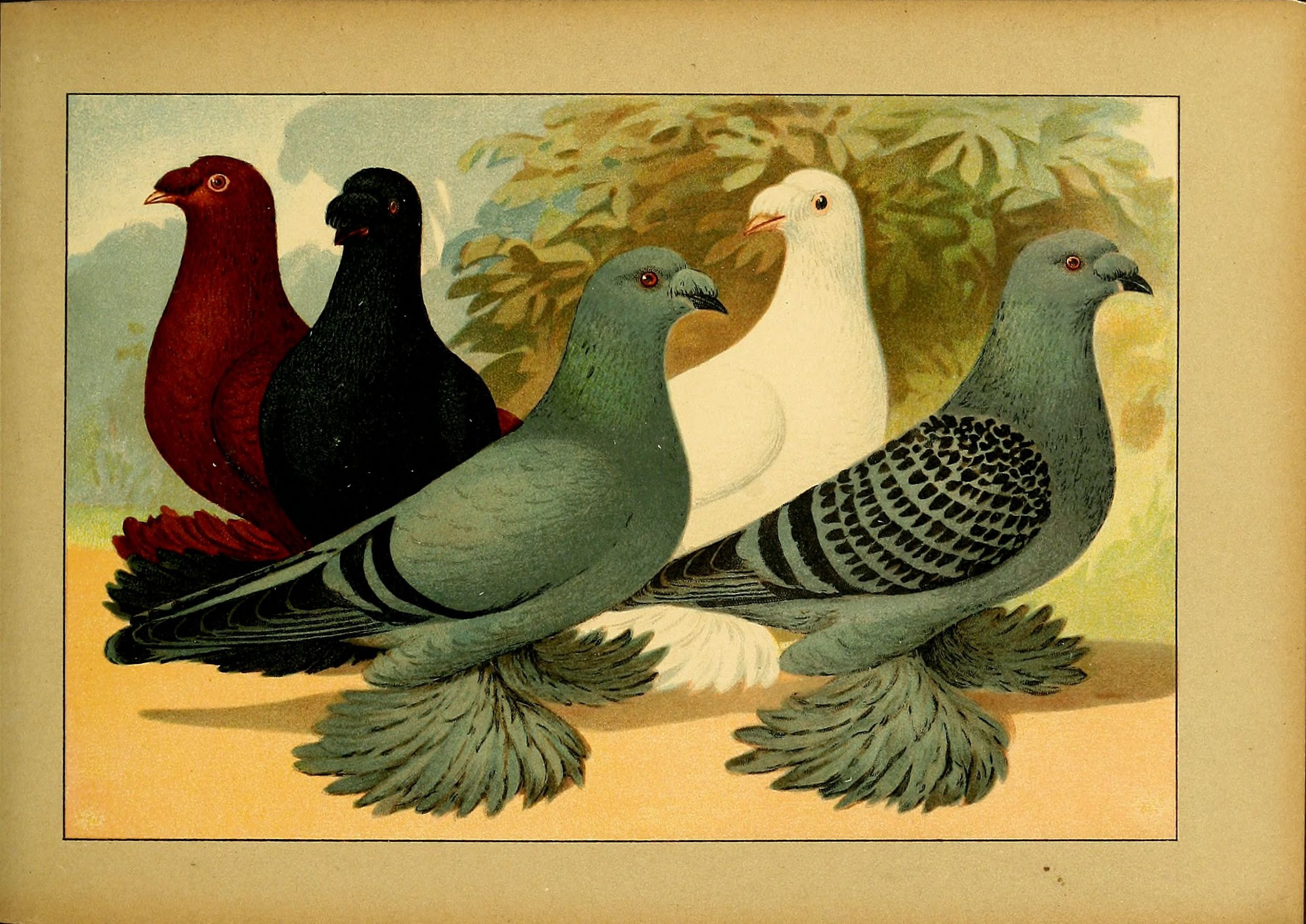
Schachtzabel 1906 Tafel 49
- German Beauty Homer (D/032)
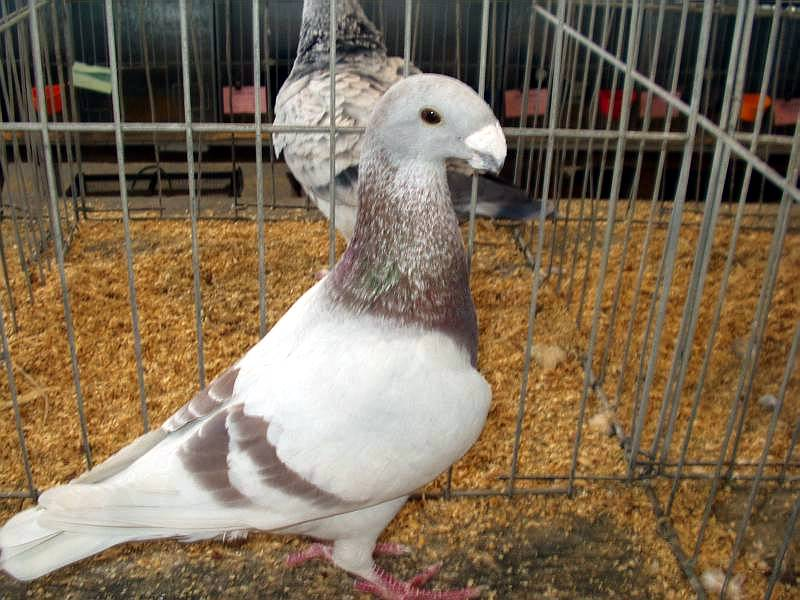
Red bar German Beauty Homer
- German Colour-tail Owl pigeon (D/709)
- German Double-crested Trumpeter (D/502)
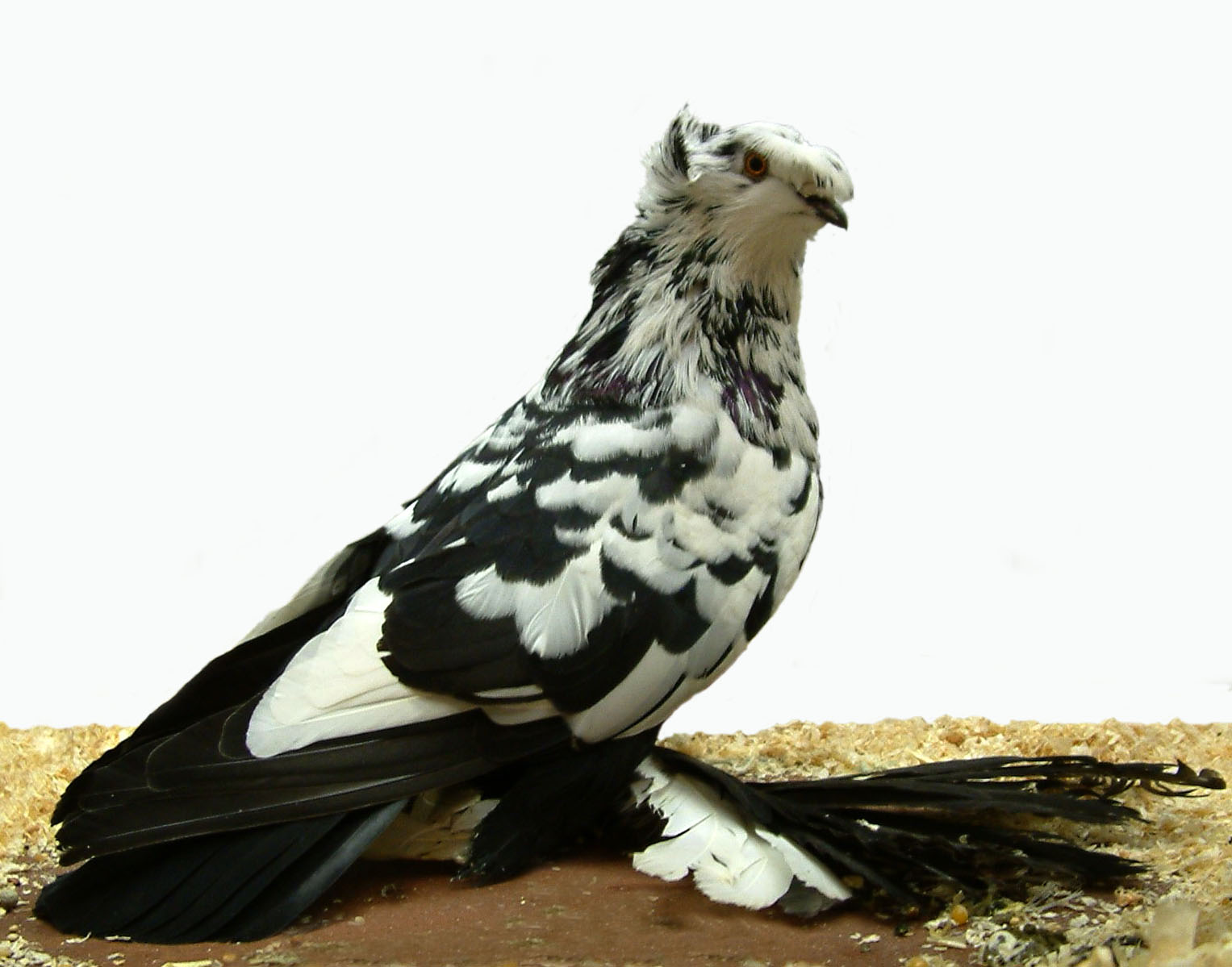
German Double Crested Trumpeter
- German Fork-tail Trumpeter (D/509)
- German Long-faced Tumbler (D/801)
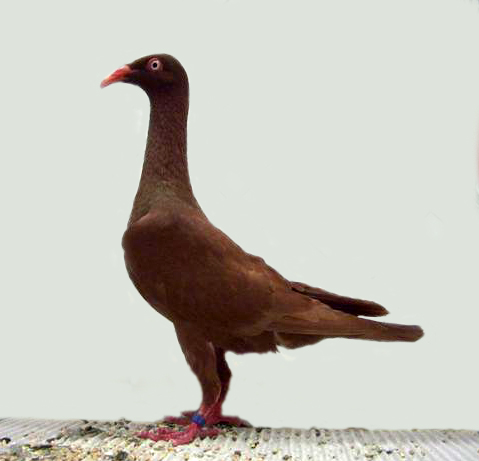
German Long Faced Tumbler
- German Modena (D/206)
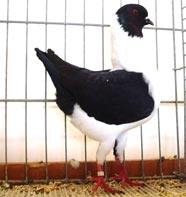
Black German Modena
- German Nun (D/897)
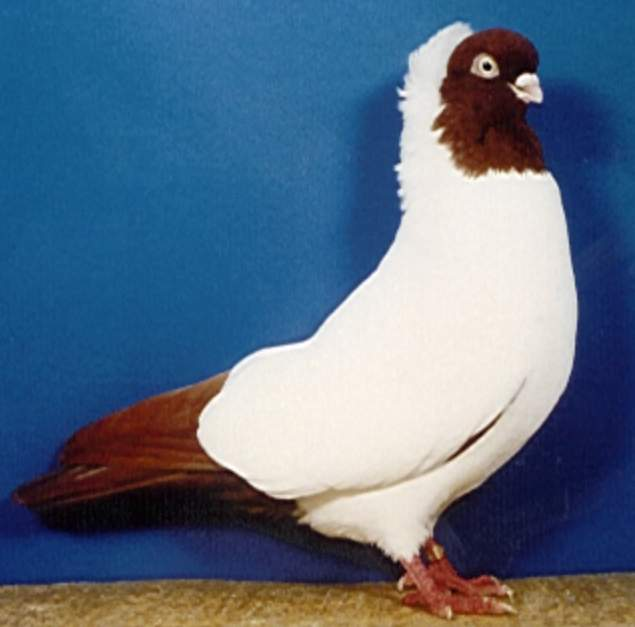
German Nun: Red
- German Shield Owl pigeon (D/708)
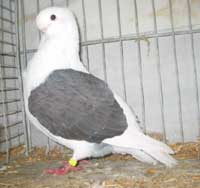
German Shield Owl
- German Show Tippler (D/840) → Tippler
- Ghent Cropper (B/309)
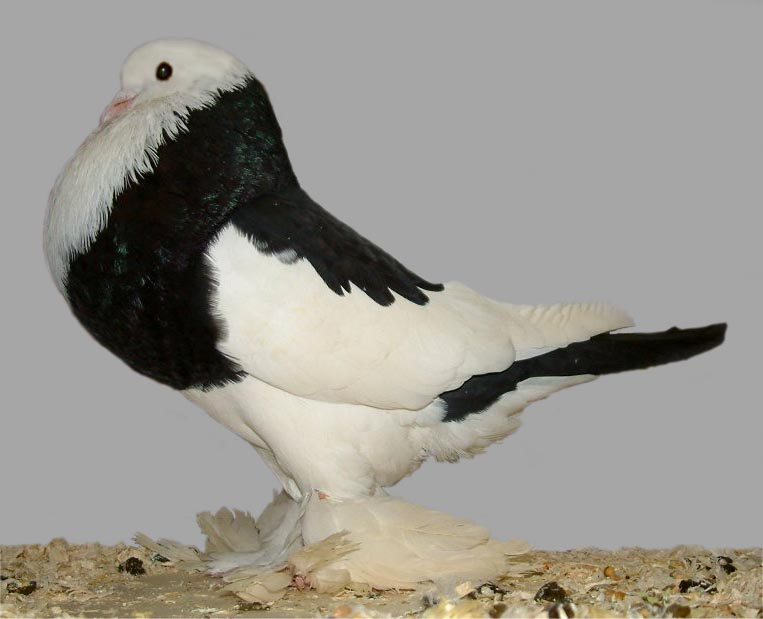
Ghent Cropper
- Ghent Owl pigeon (B/718)
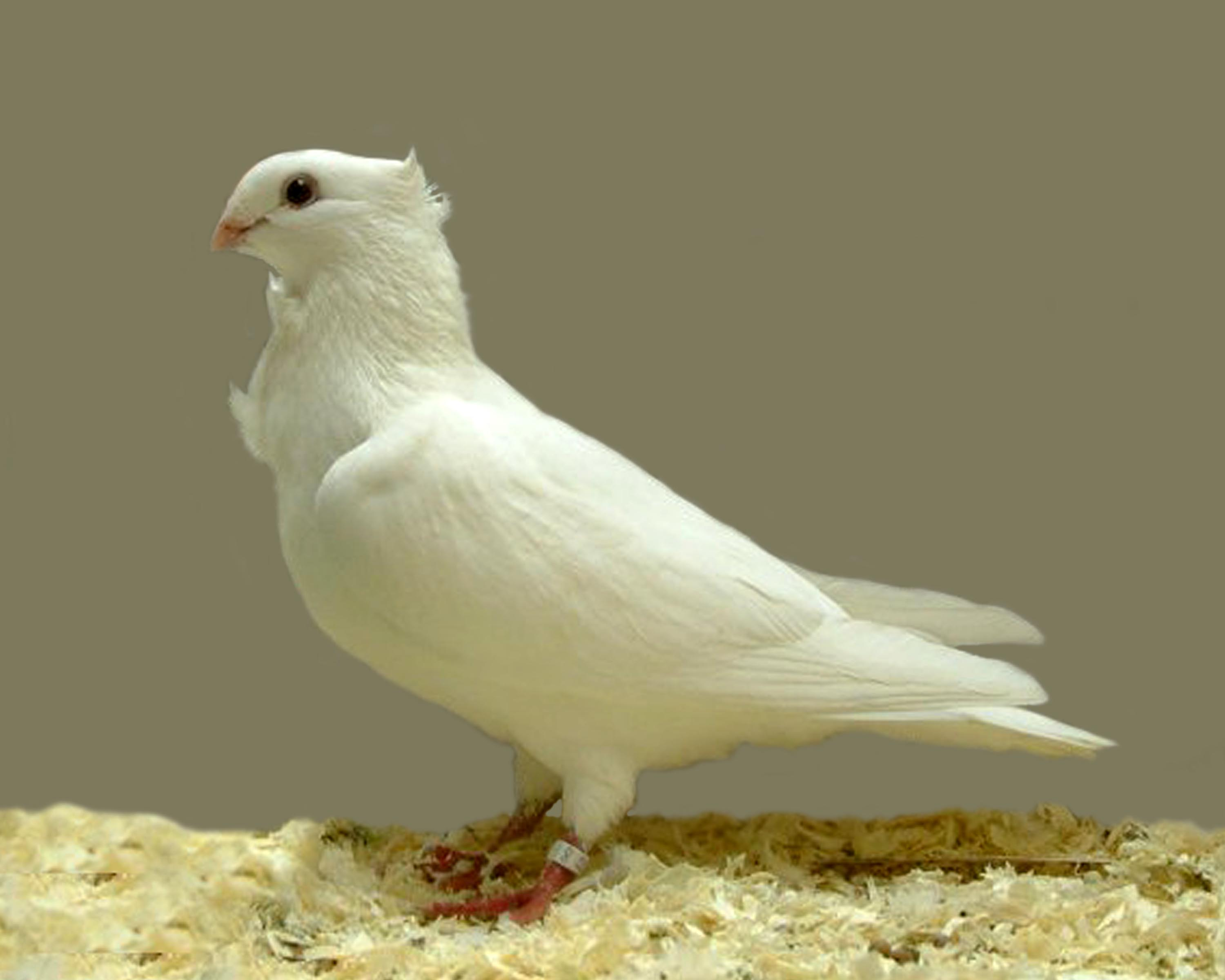
White Ghent Owl
- Giant American Crest
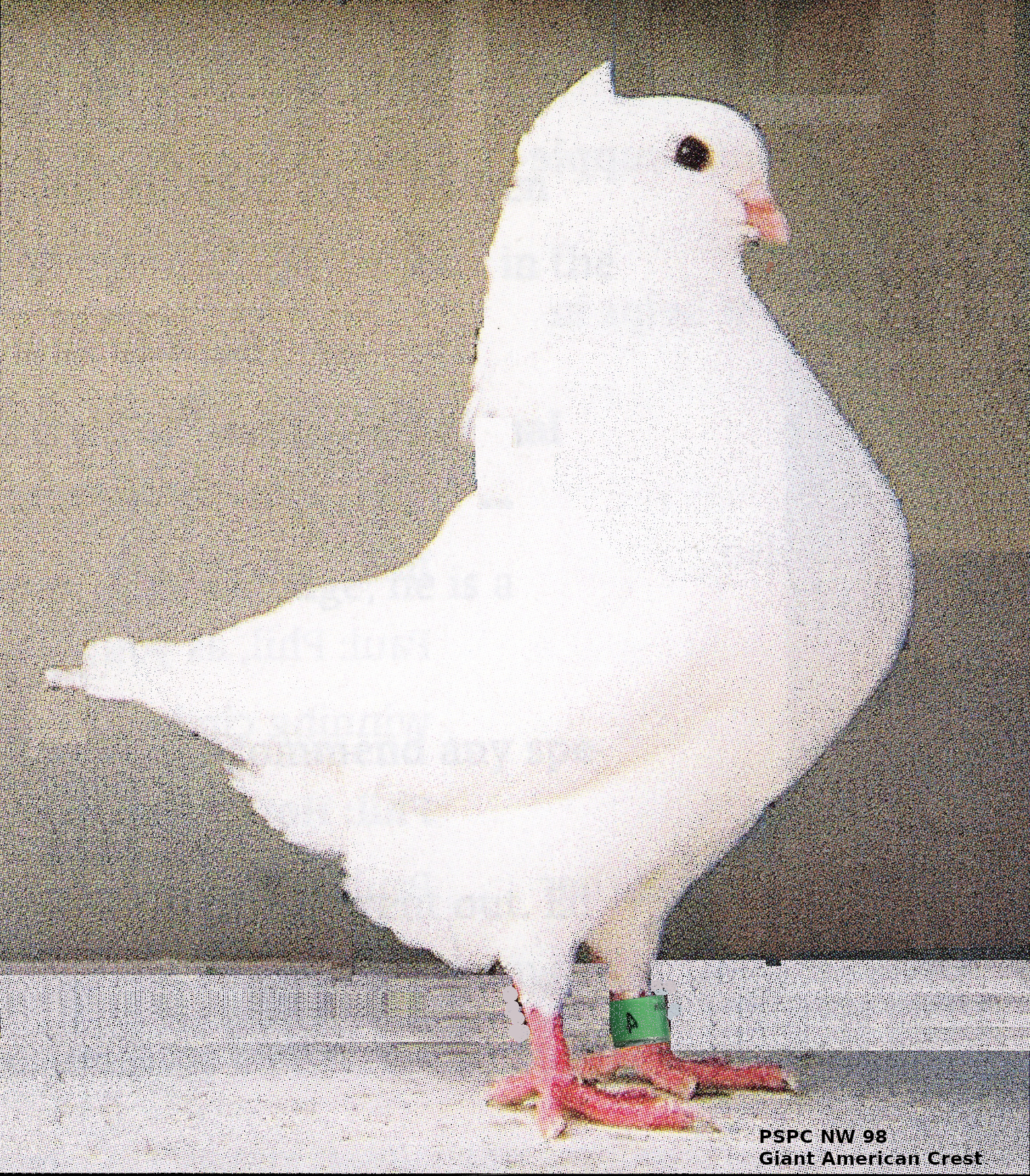
White Giant American Crest

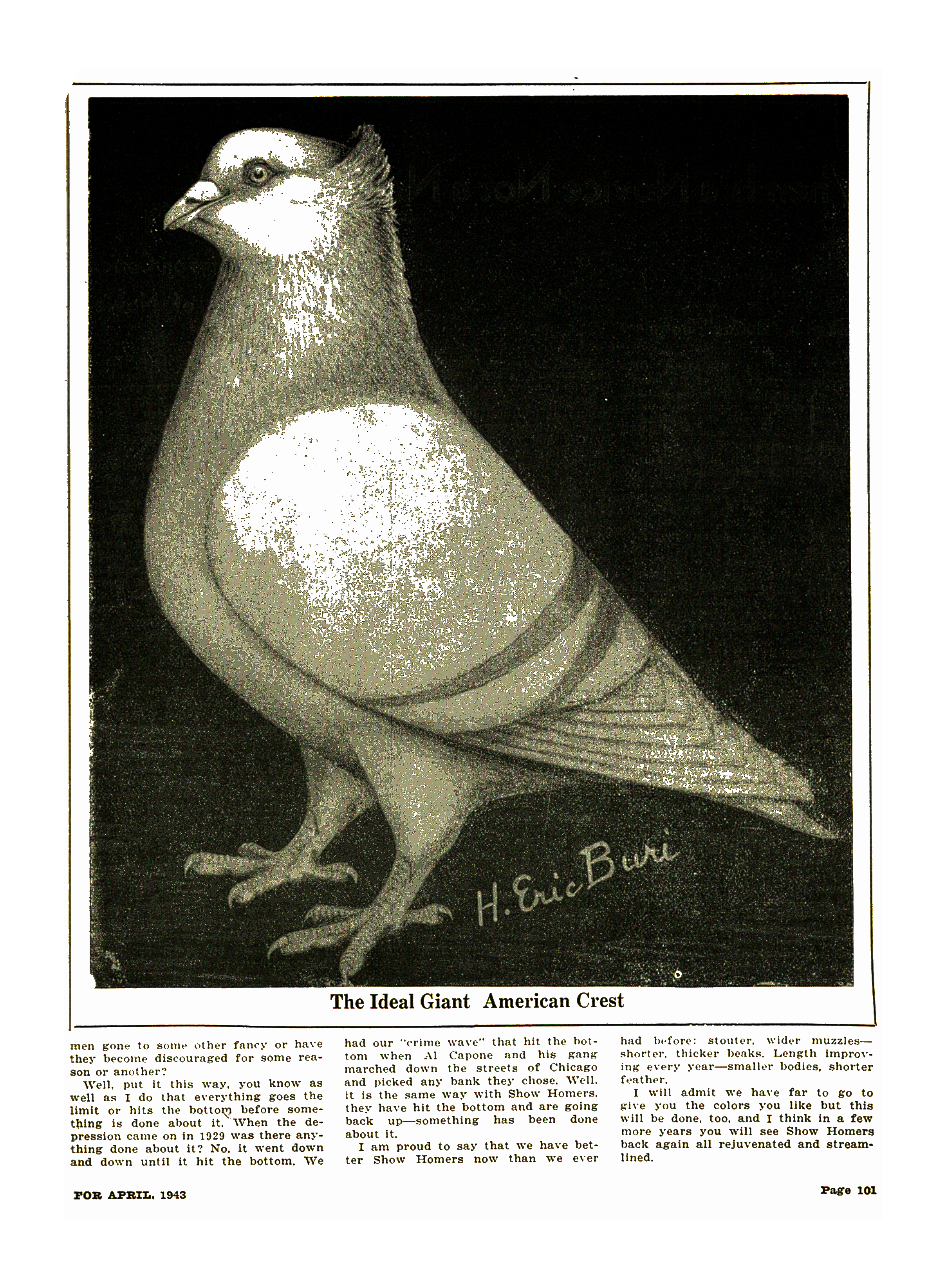
American Giant Crest
- Giant Homer (ESKT/030)[1] (= American Giant Homer)
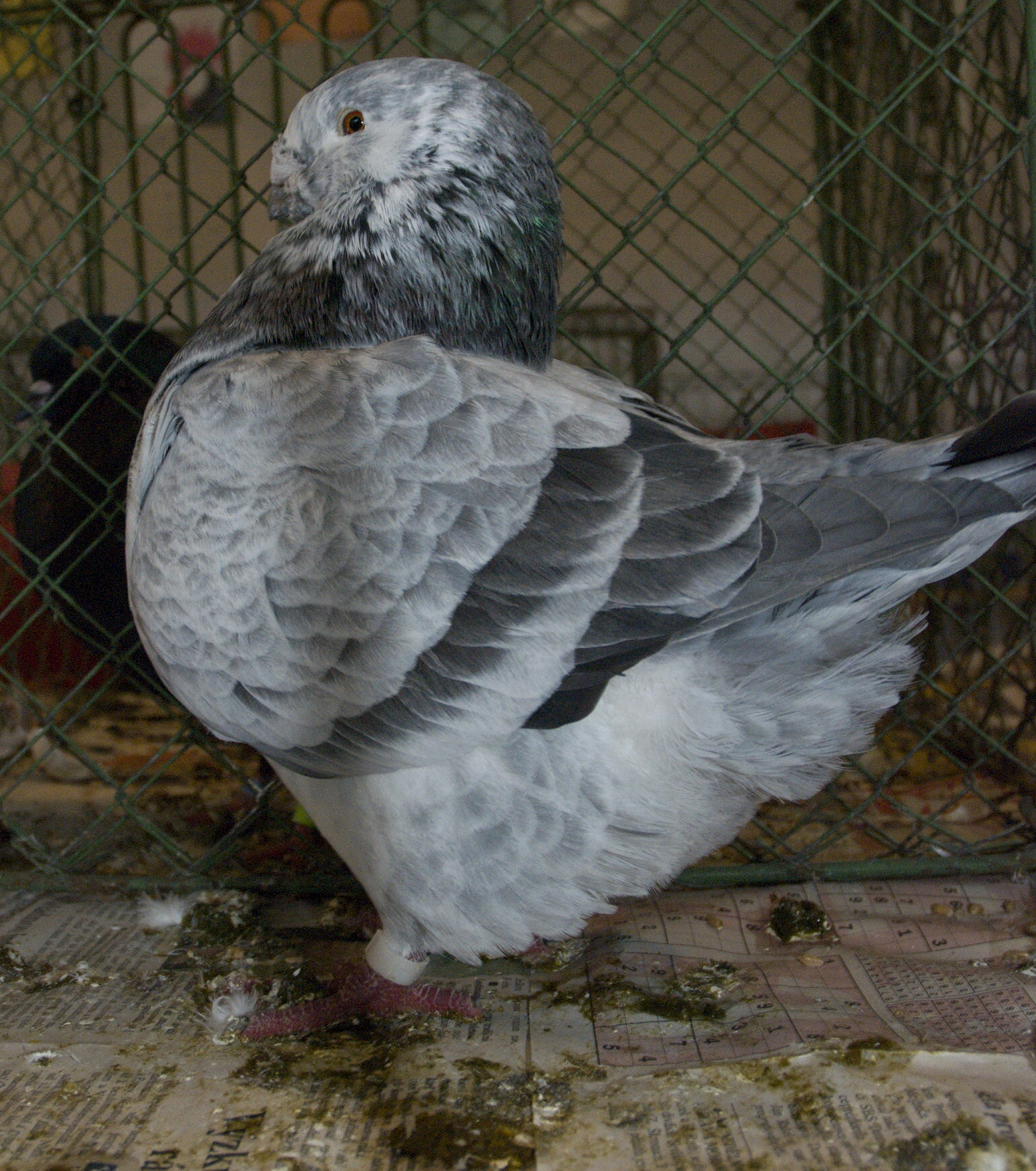
Giant Homer: Grizzle
- Giant Mallorquina Runt
- Gier (F/009)
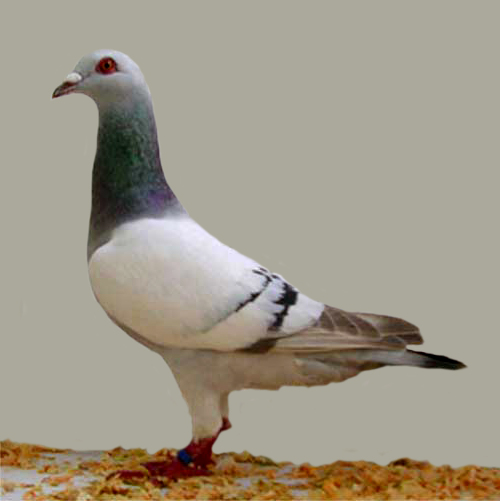
Silver bar Gier
- Gimpel (D/402) (= Archangel)
- Goeteborg Tumbler (S/878)
- Gola
- Gorguero Cropper (E/339)
- Granadino Pouter (E/343)
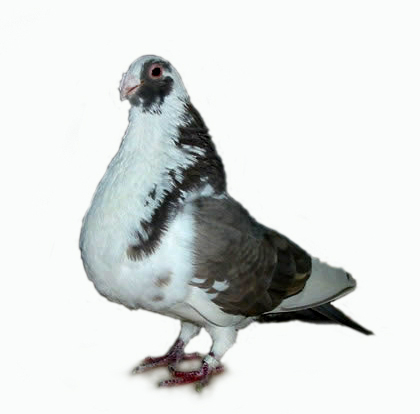
Dun Granadino Cropper
- Griwuni Tumbler (RUS^{(D)}/871)
- Groninger Slenke (NL/1105)
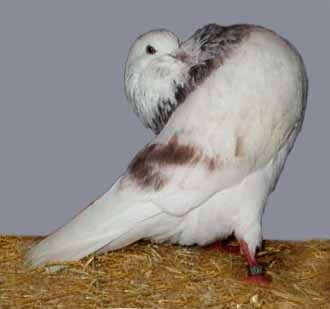
Groninger Slenke
- Gumbinnen White-head Tumbler (D/909)
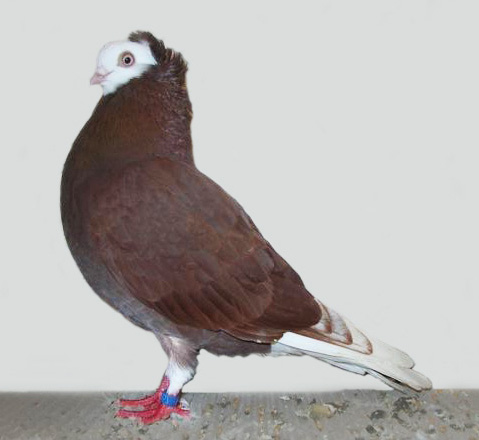
Red Gumbinnen Whitehead

== H ==
- Hague Highflyer/Hagenaar (Dutch breed) (NL/875)
- Hamburg Helmet (D/900)
- Hamburg Schimmel (D/898)
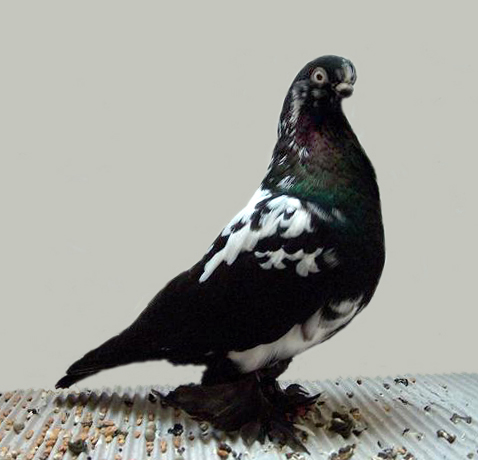
Black Hamberg Schimmel

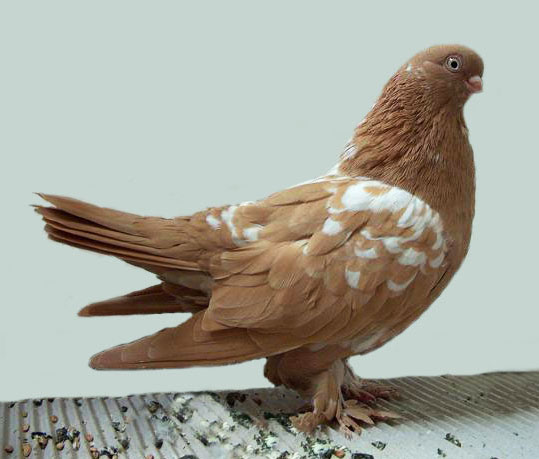
Yellow Hamberg Schimmel
- Hamburg Sticken (D/707)
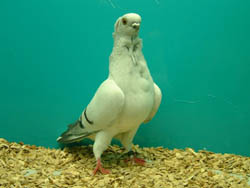
Hamburger Sticken
- Hamburg Tumbler (D/899)
- Hamedan Highflyer Saxon
- Hana Pouter (CZ/314)
- Hannover Tumbler (D/813)
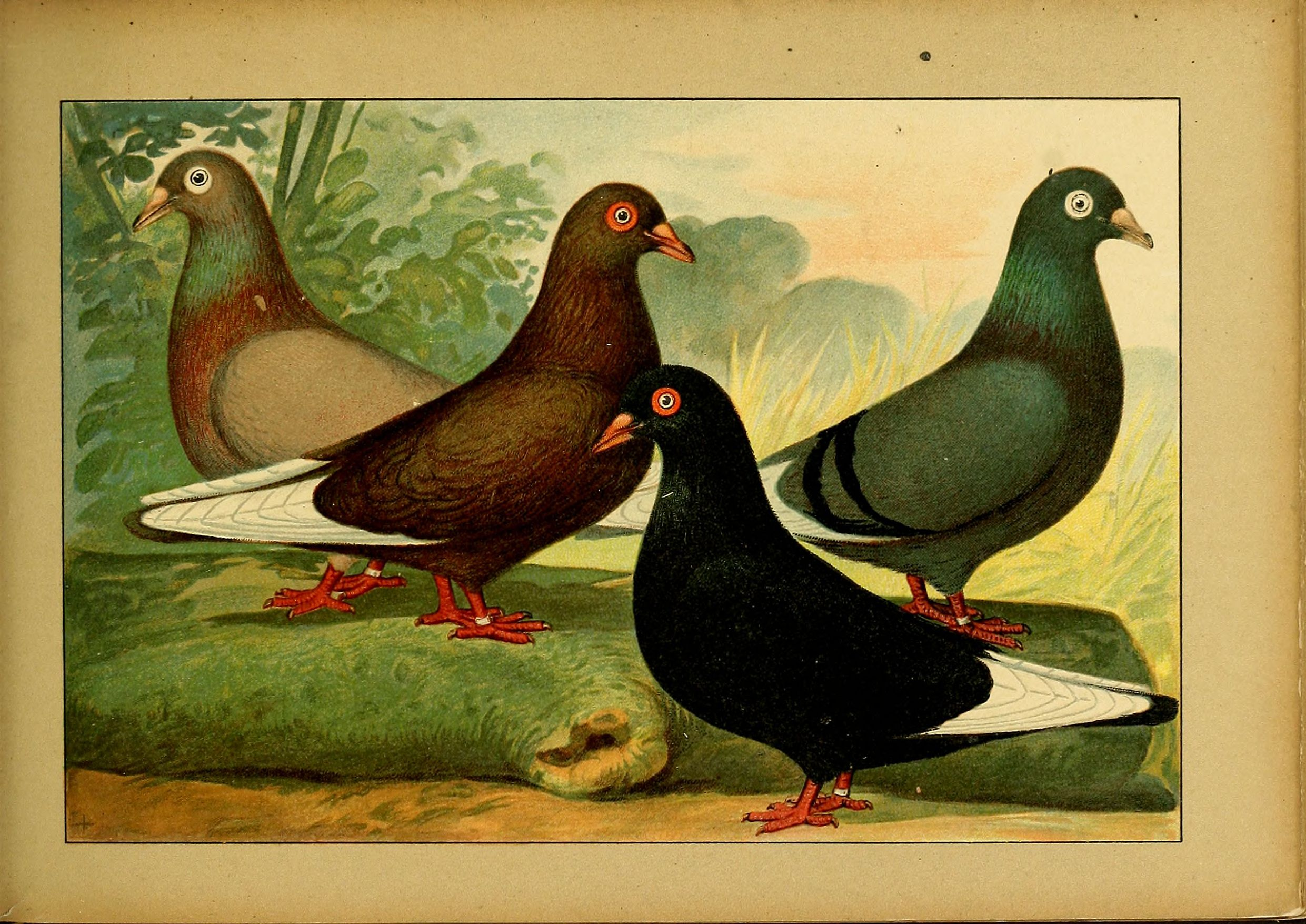
Schachtzabel 1906 Tafel 77
- Harzburg Trumpeter Pouter (D/506)
- Haskow Colour-head Tumbler (BG/991) (= Karabasch)
- Helmet Pigeons, a group of pigeon breeds
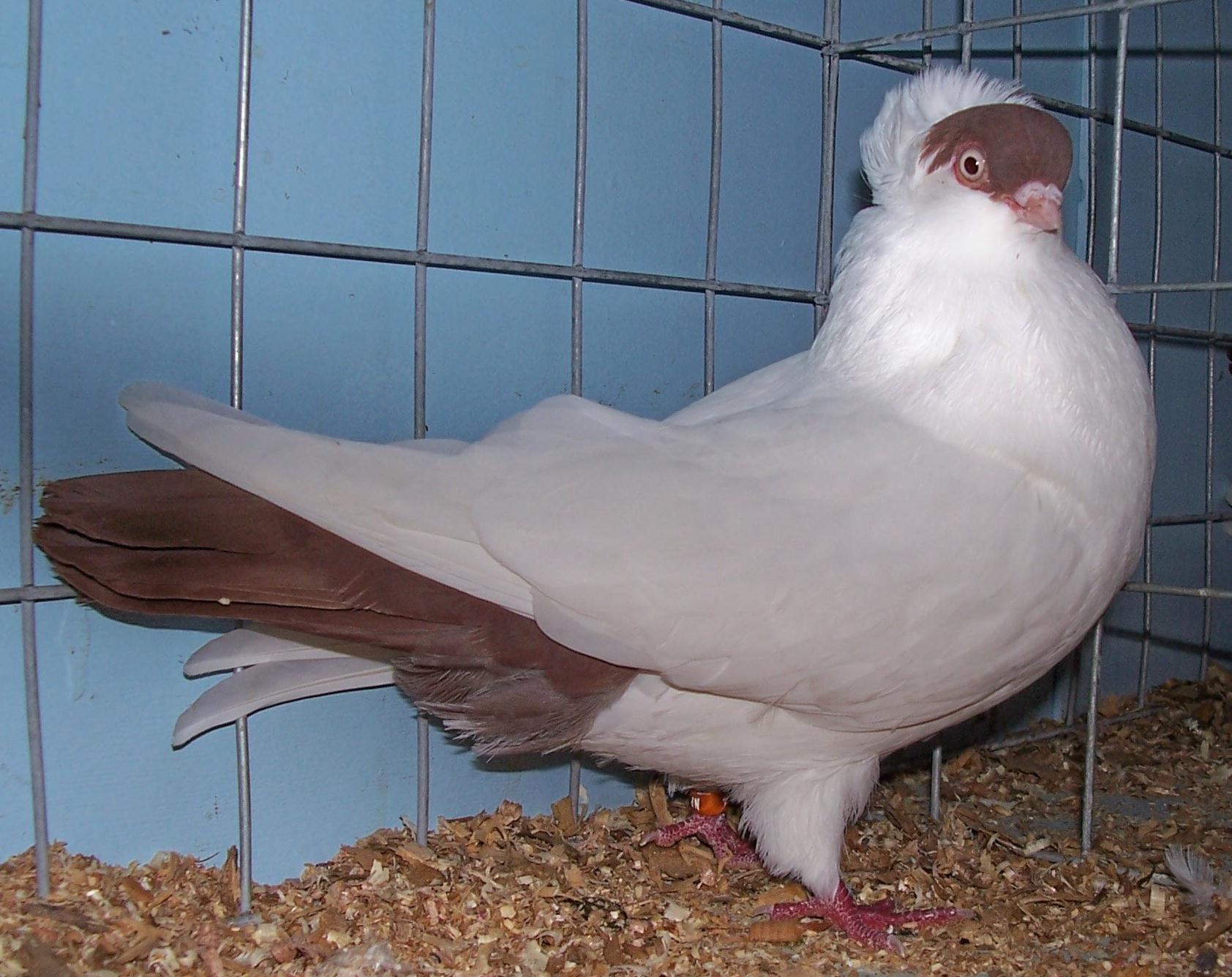
Red crested Helmet

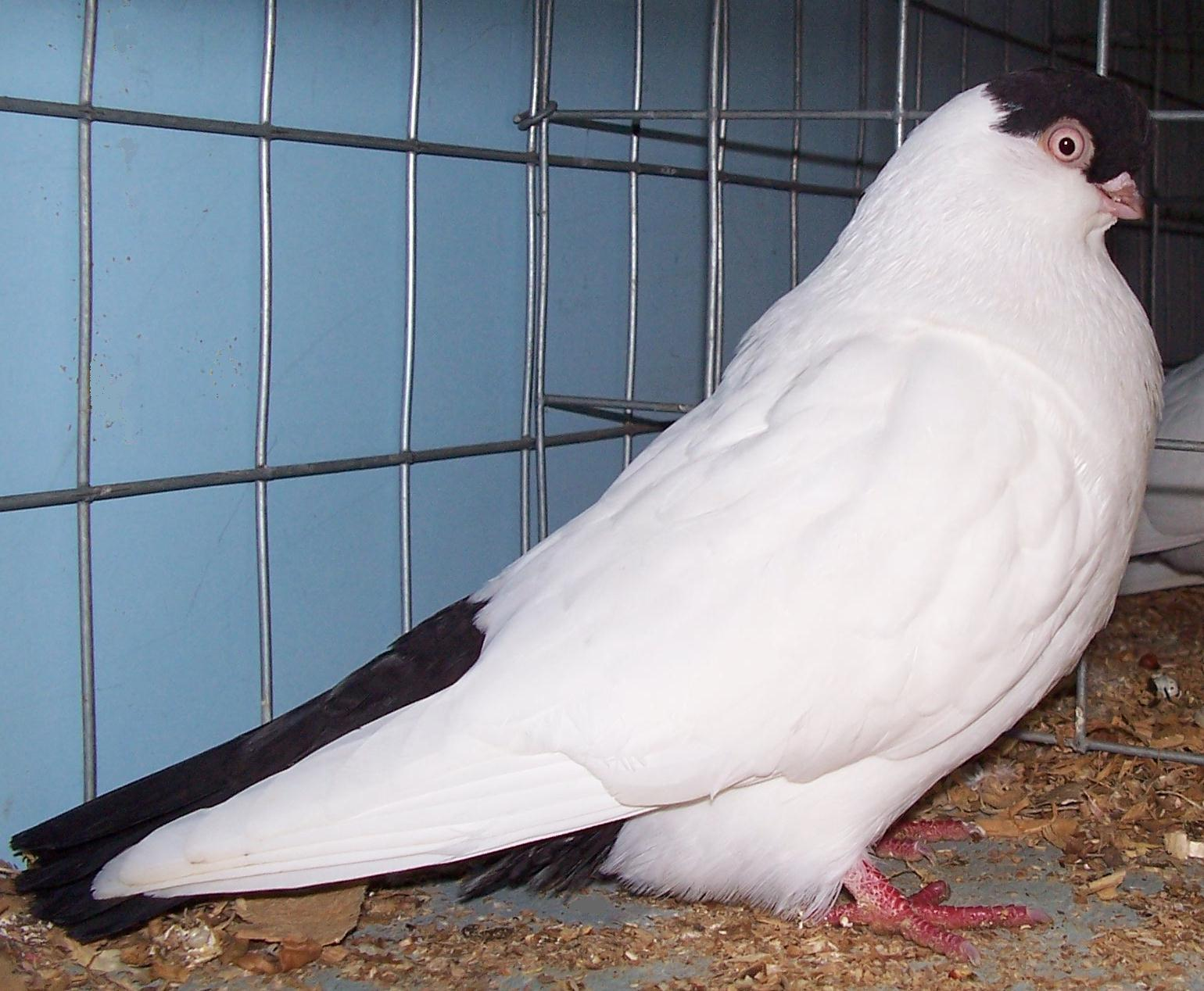
Black Helmet (plain head)
- Hessian Pouter (D/317)
- Hódmezövásárhelyer Show Crest Tumbler (H/959)
- Holle Cropper (NL/331)
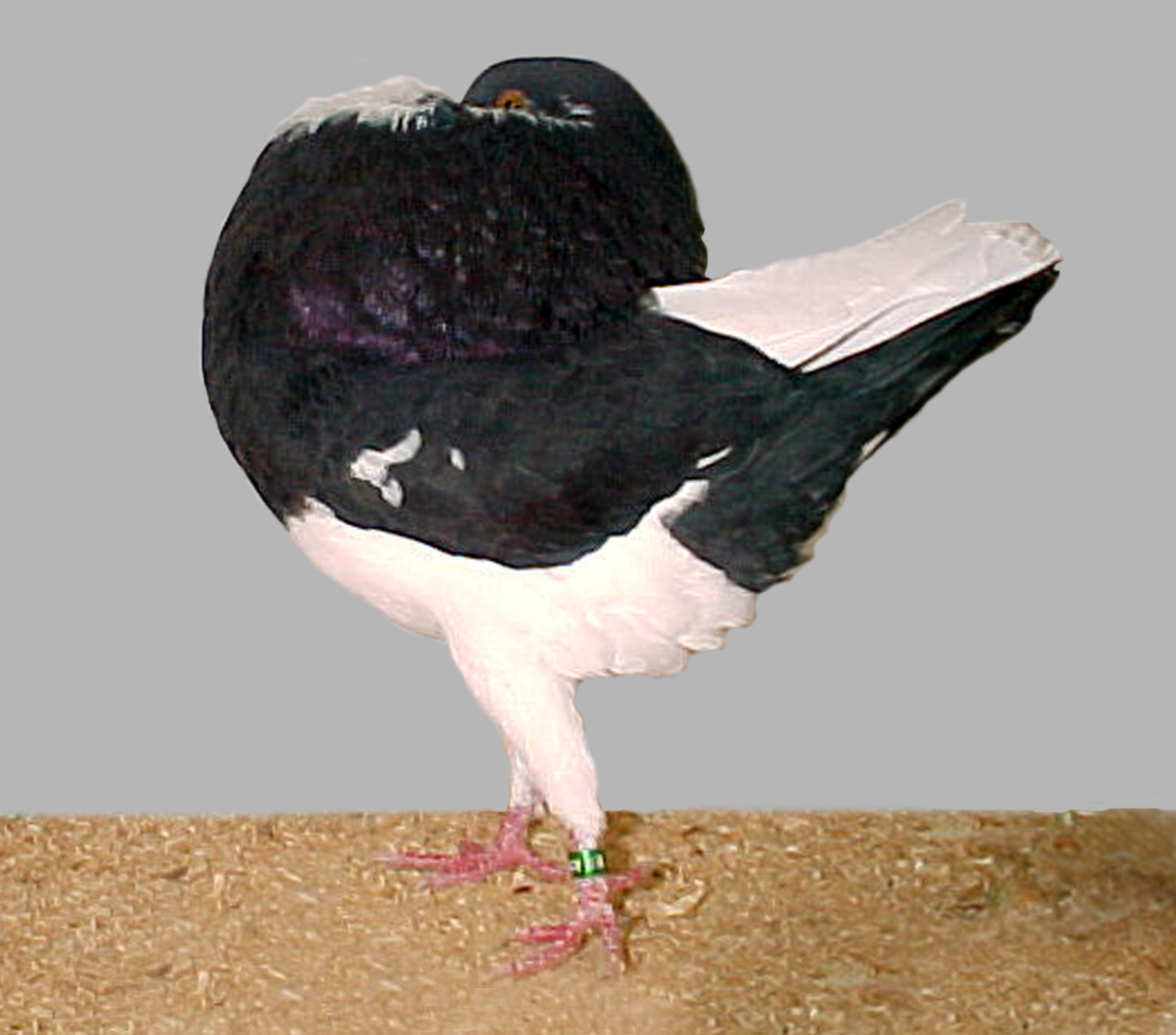
Black Holle Cropper
- Homing Pigeon
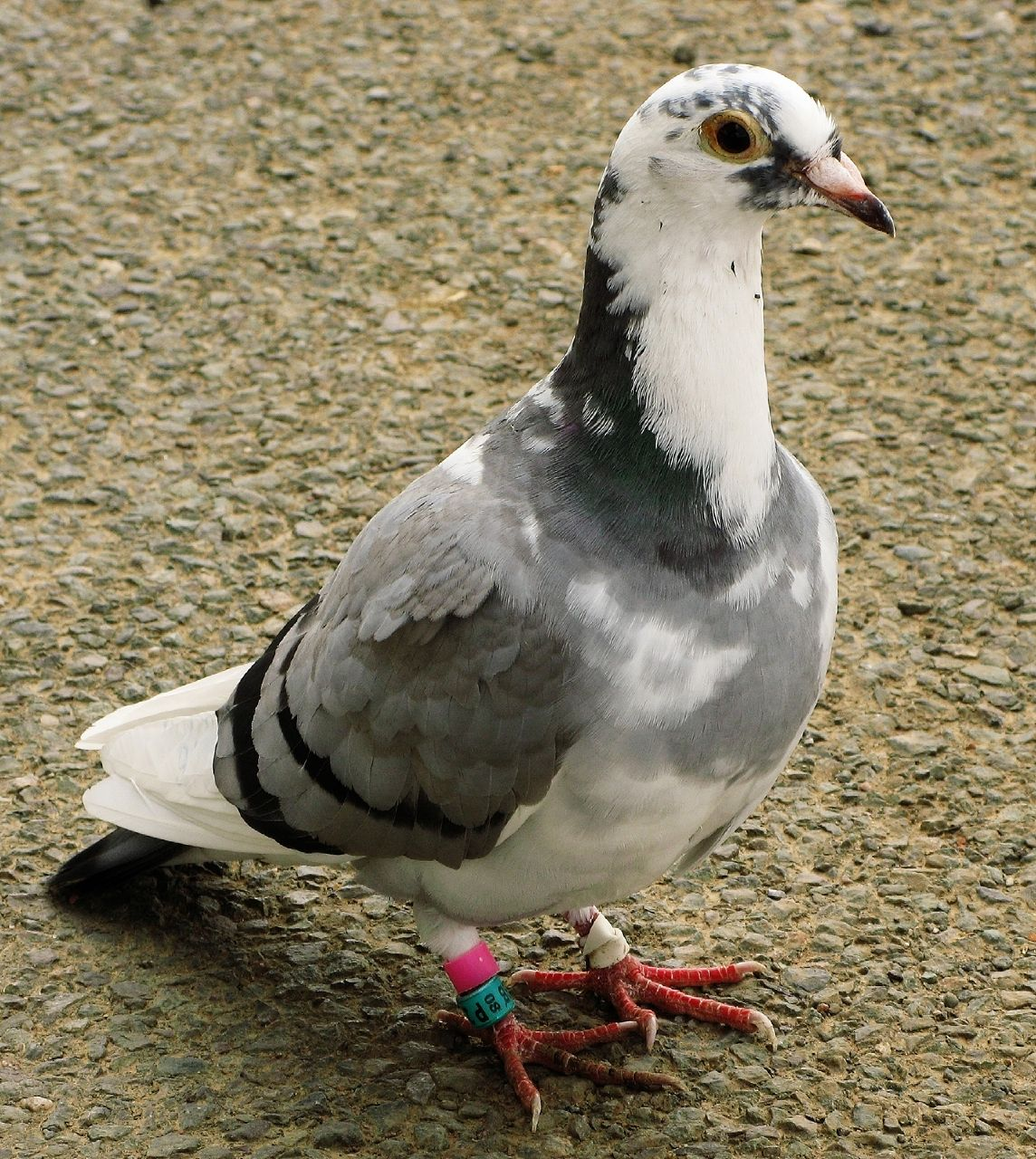
Pied Racing Homer

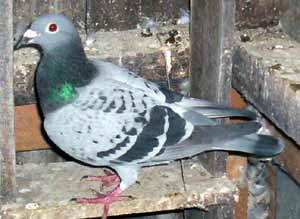
Blue check Racing Homer

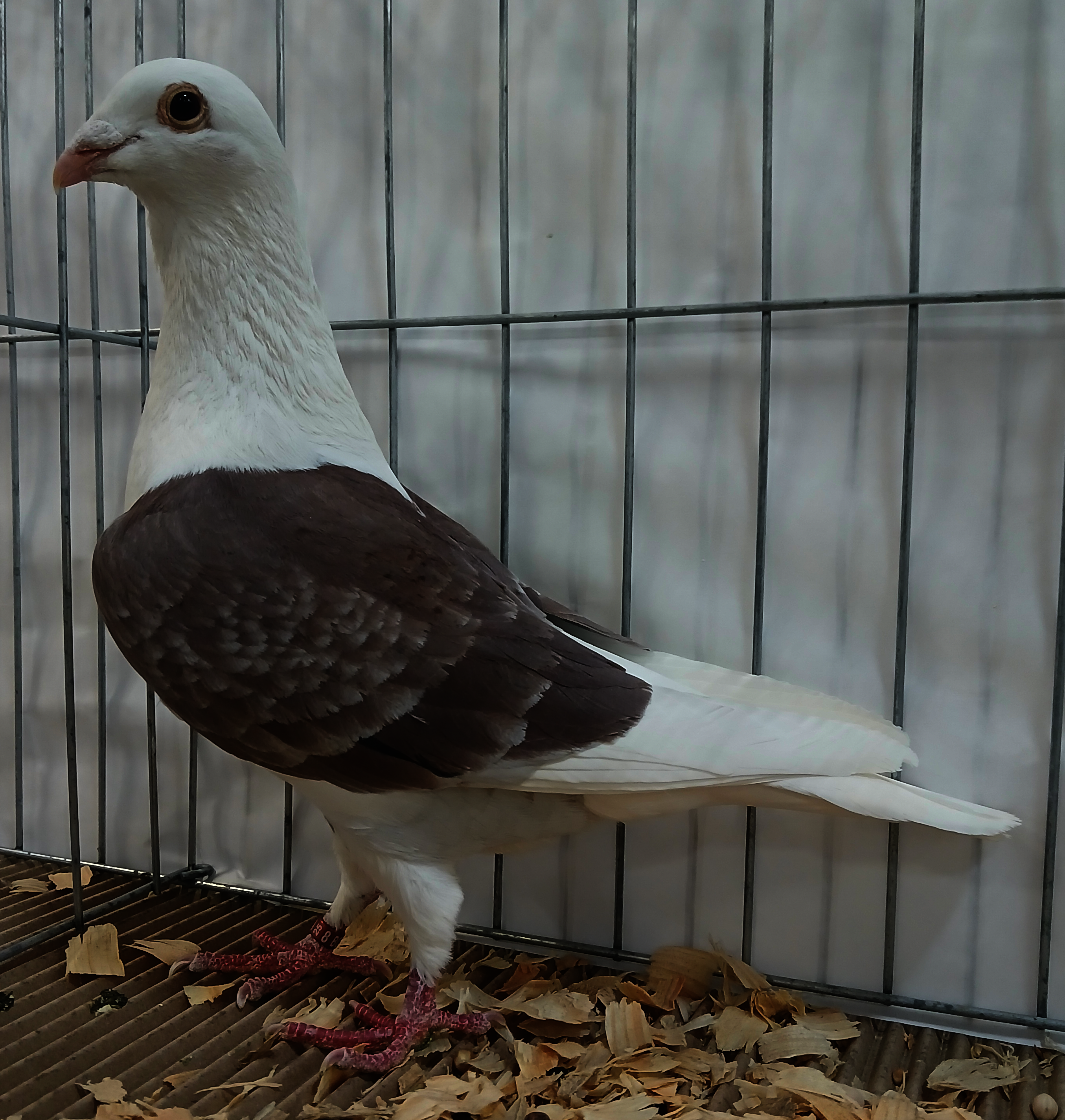
Saddle Homer
- Horseman Pouter (GB/332)
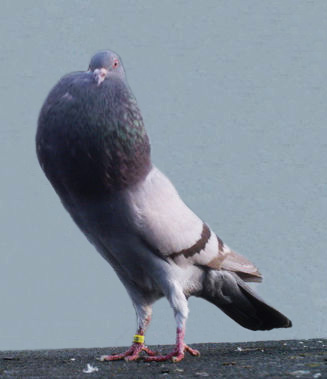
Blue bar Horseman Pouter

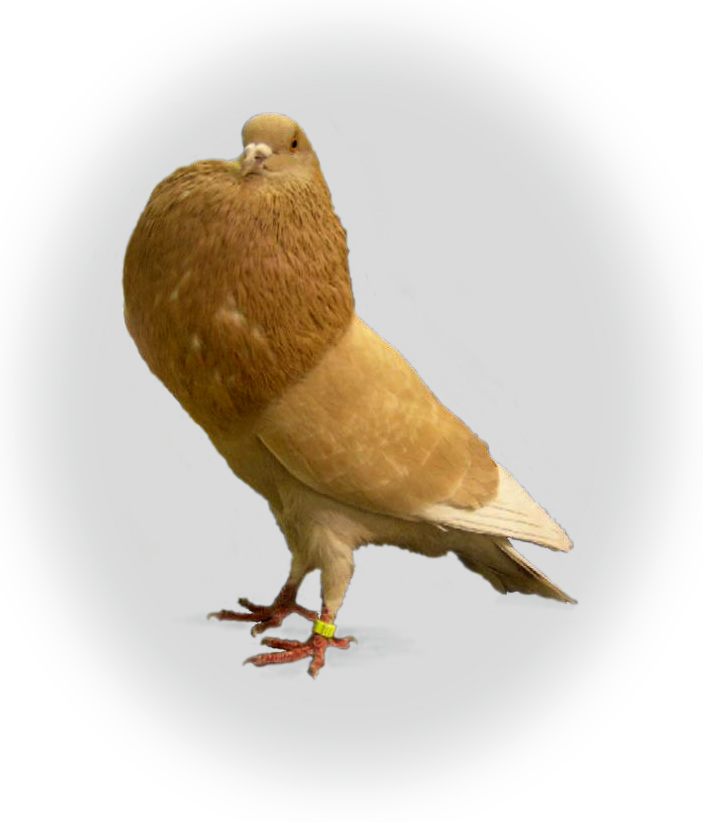
Yellow Horseman Pouter
- Hungarian (A/202)
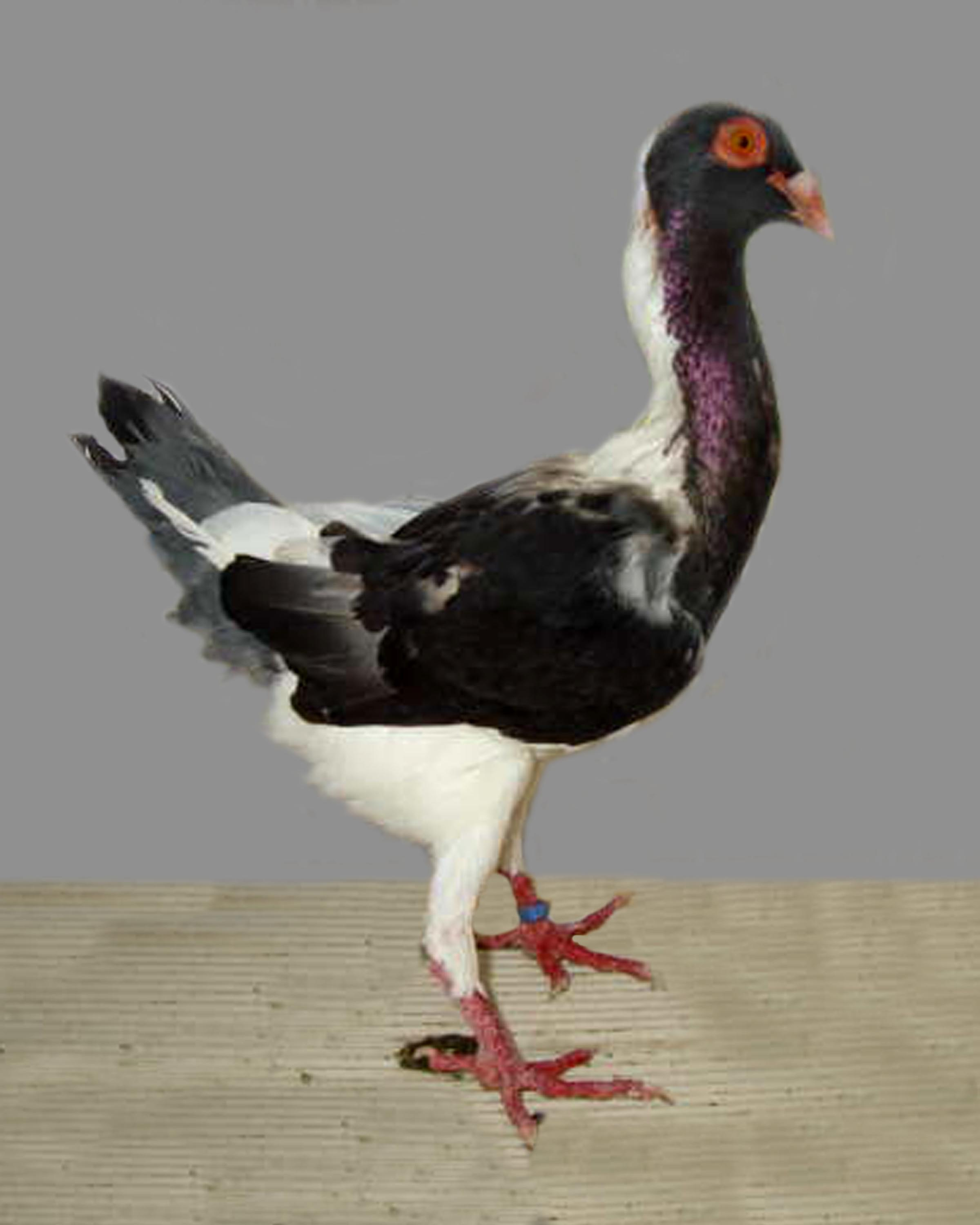
Black Hungarian
- Hungarian Beauty Homer (H/036)
- Hungarian Buga Pigeon (= Buga Pigeon (H/062))
- Hungarian Cropper (H/347)
- Hungarian Dark-storked Highflyer (H/966)
- Hungarian Egri Tumbler
- Hungarian Fantail (H/612)
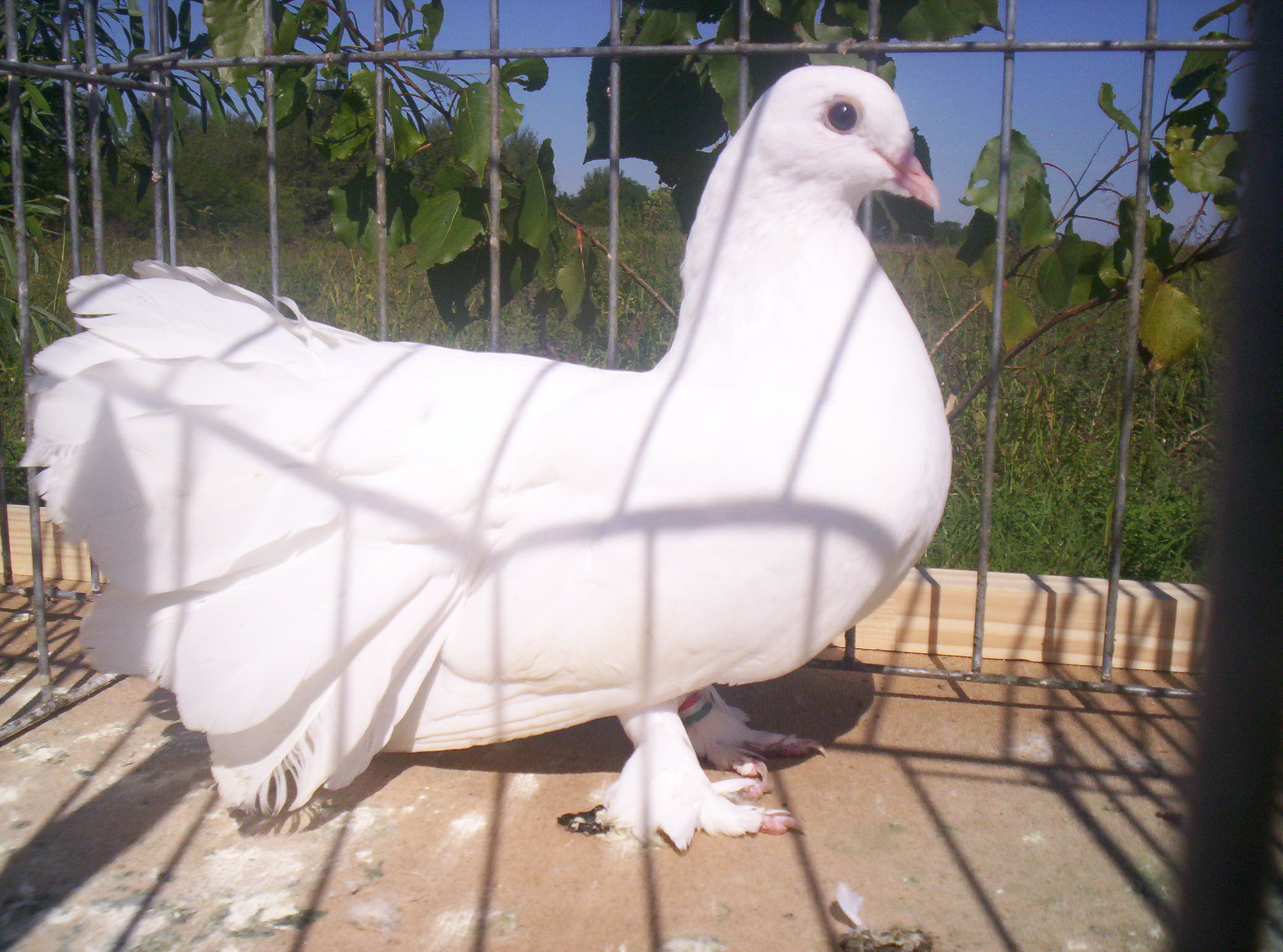
White Magyar páva (fantail)
- Hungarian Giant Pigeon (H/002)
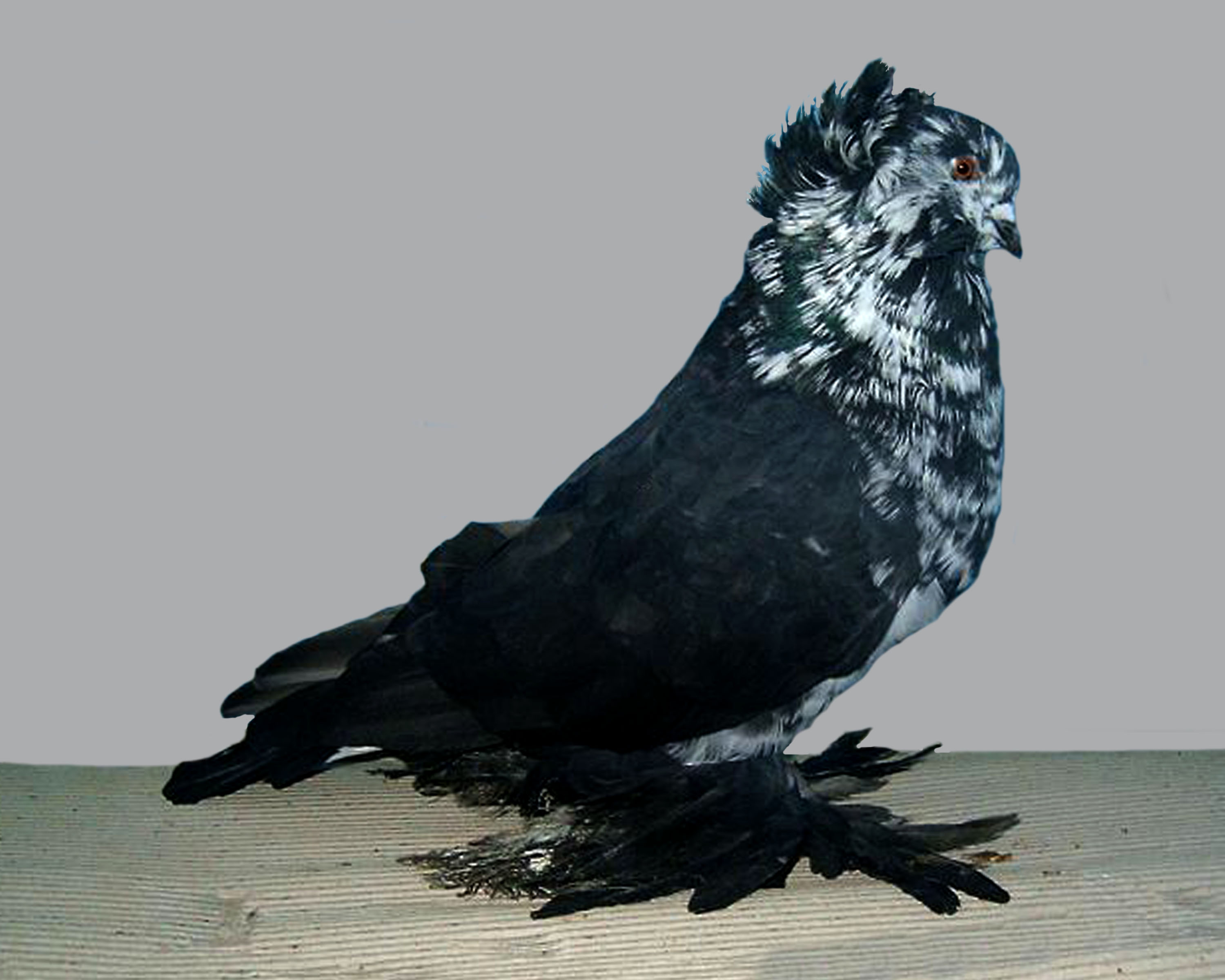
Black Hungarian Giant
- Hungarian Giant Pouter
- Hungarian Highflyer
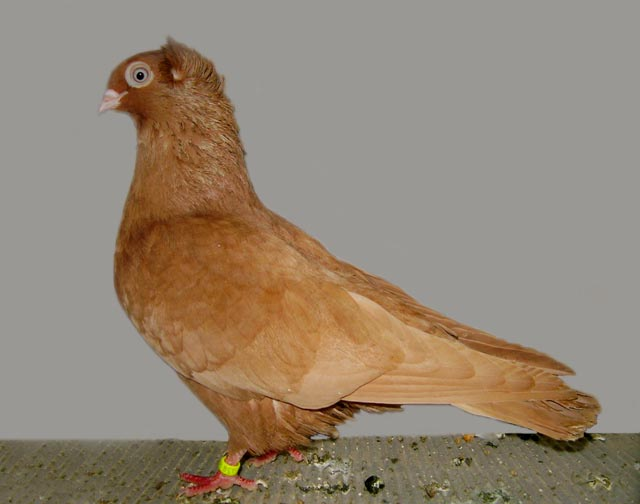
Yellow hungarian Highflyer (Szegedin)
- Hungarian Magpie Tumbler (H/958)
- Hungarian Short-beak
- Huppé Picard
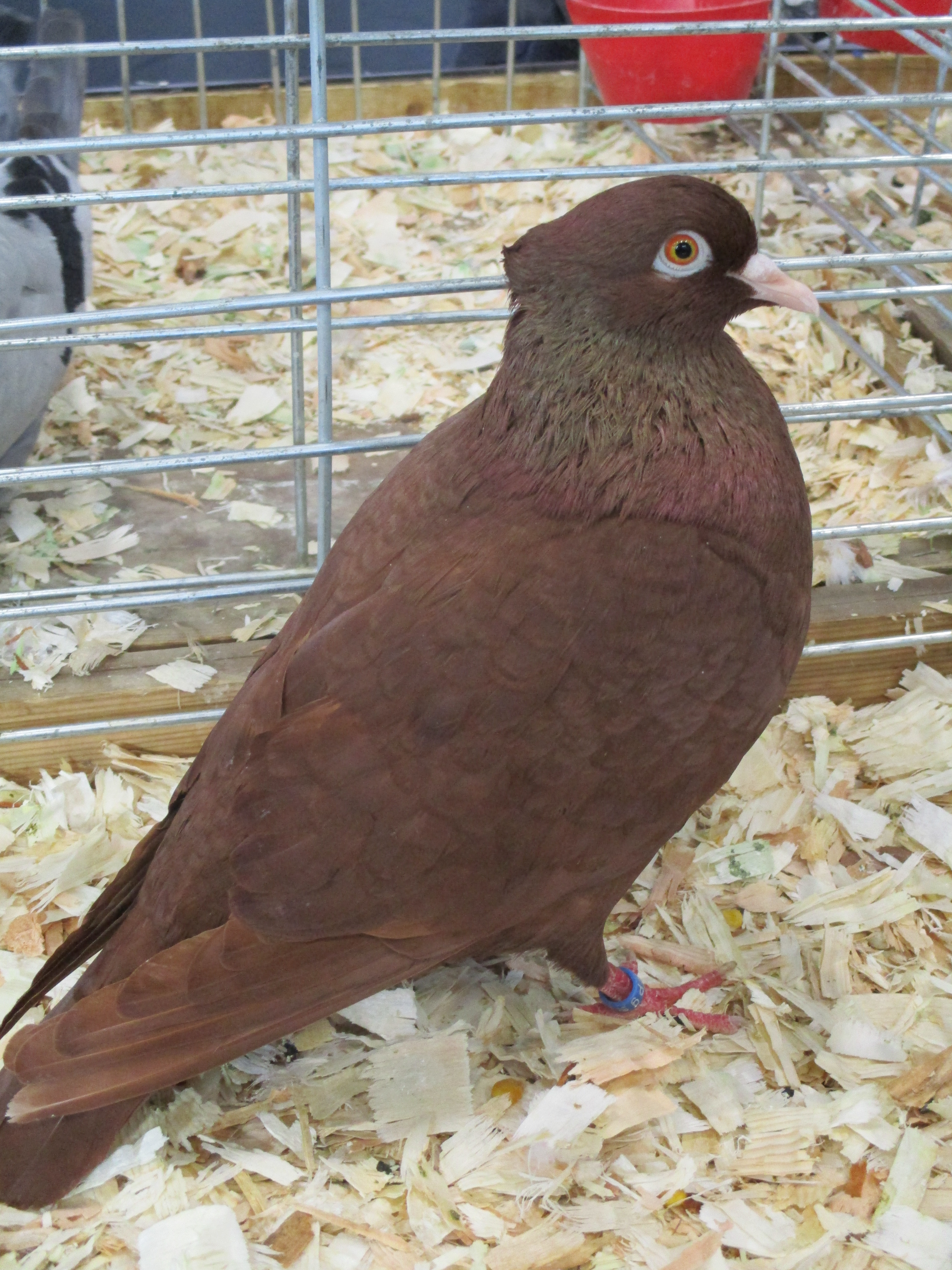
Red Huppé Picard
- Hyacinth (NL/408)

== I ==
- Ice Pigeon (D/403)
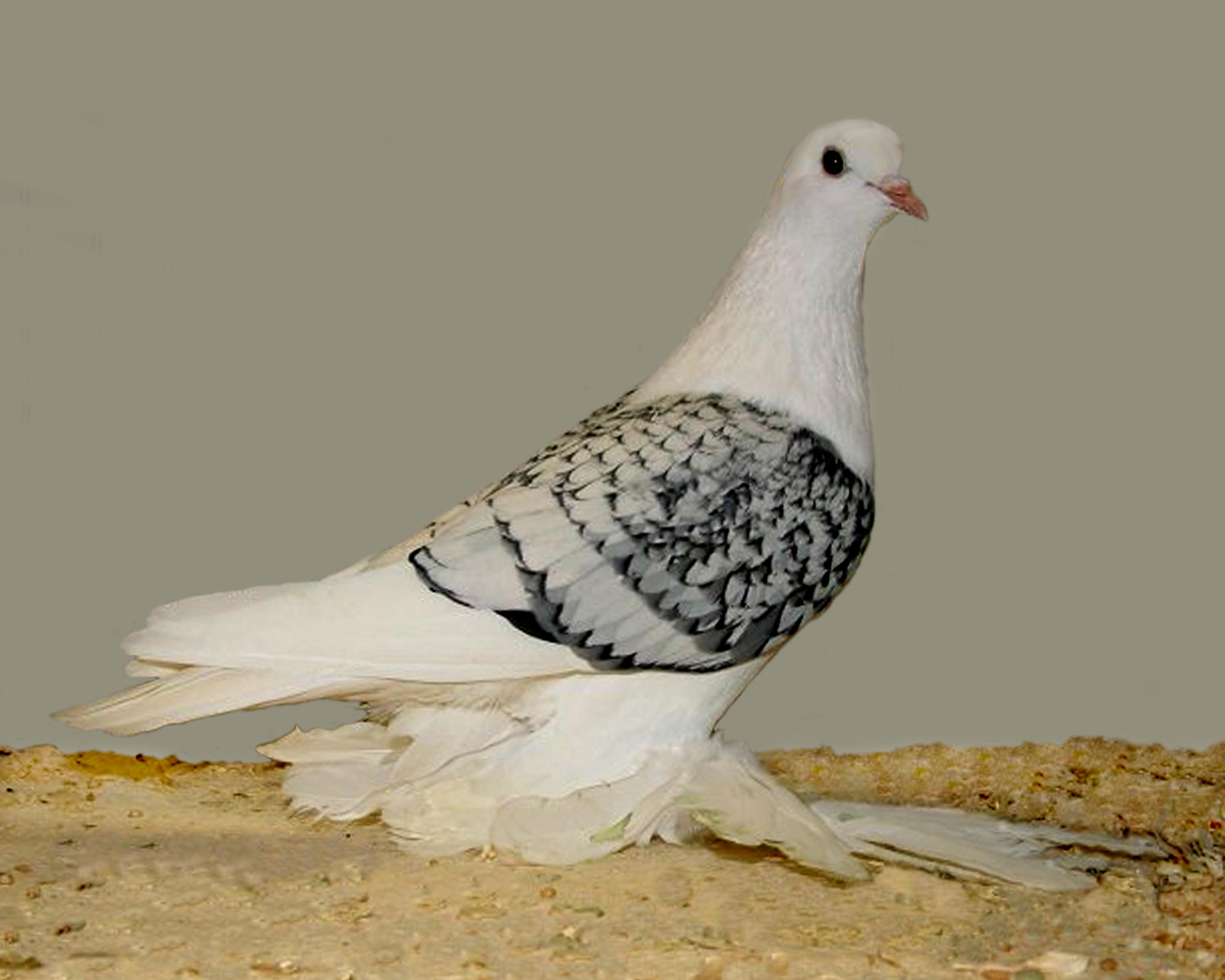
checker Ice Pigeon

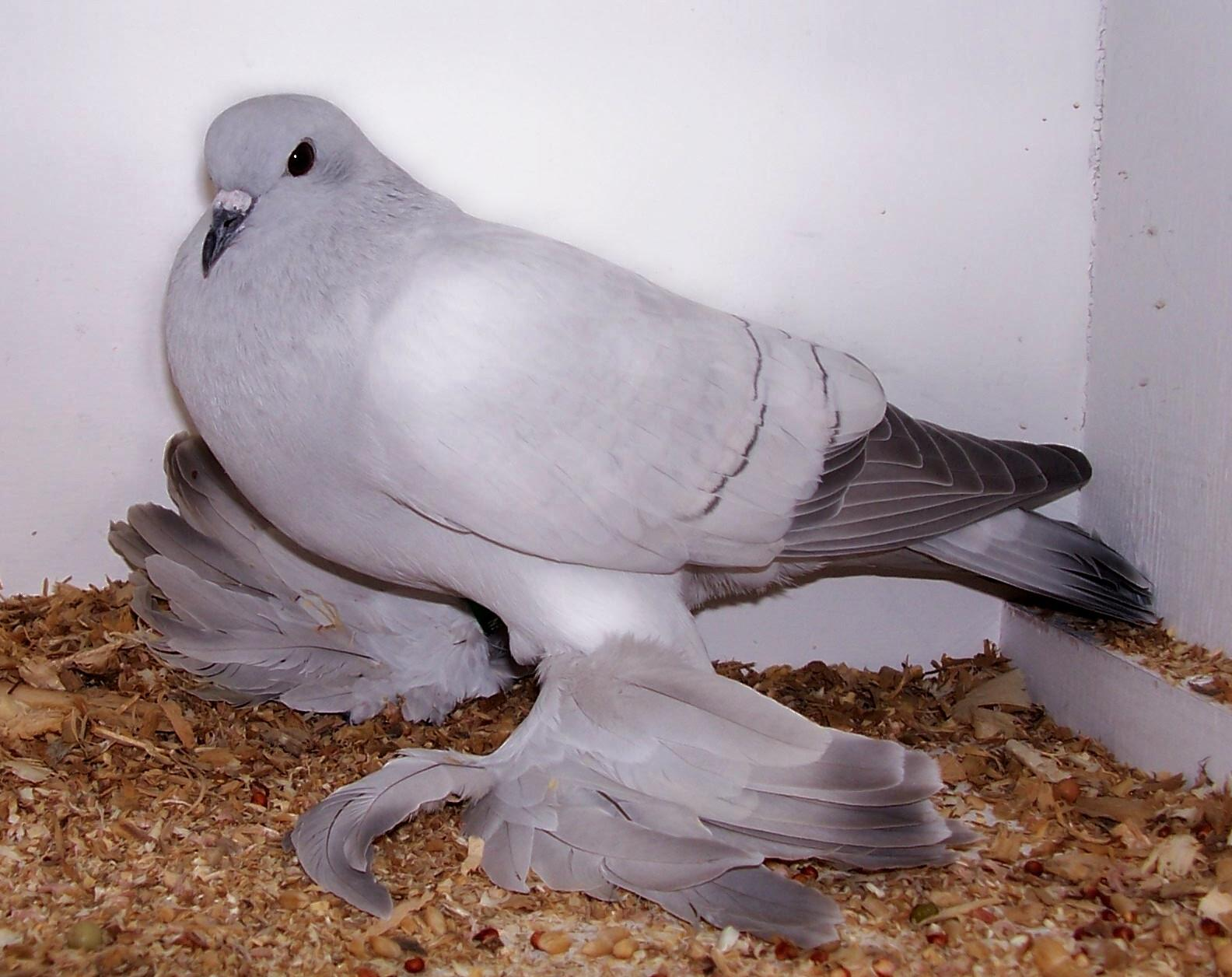
White bar Ice Pigeon
- Indian Fantail (ESKT/607)
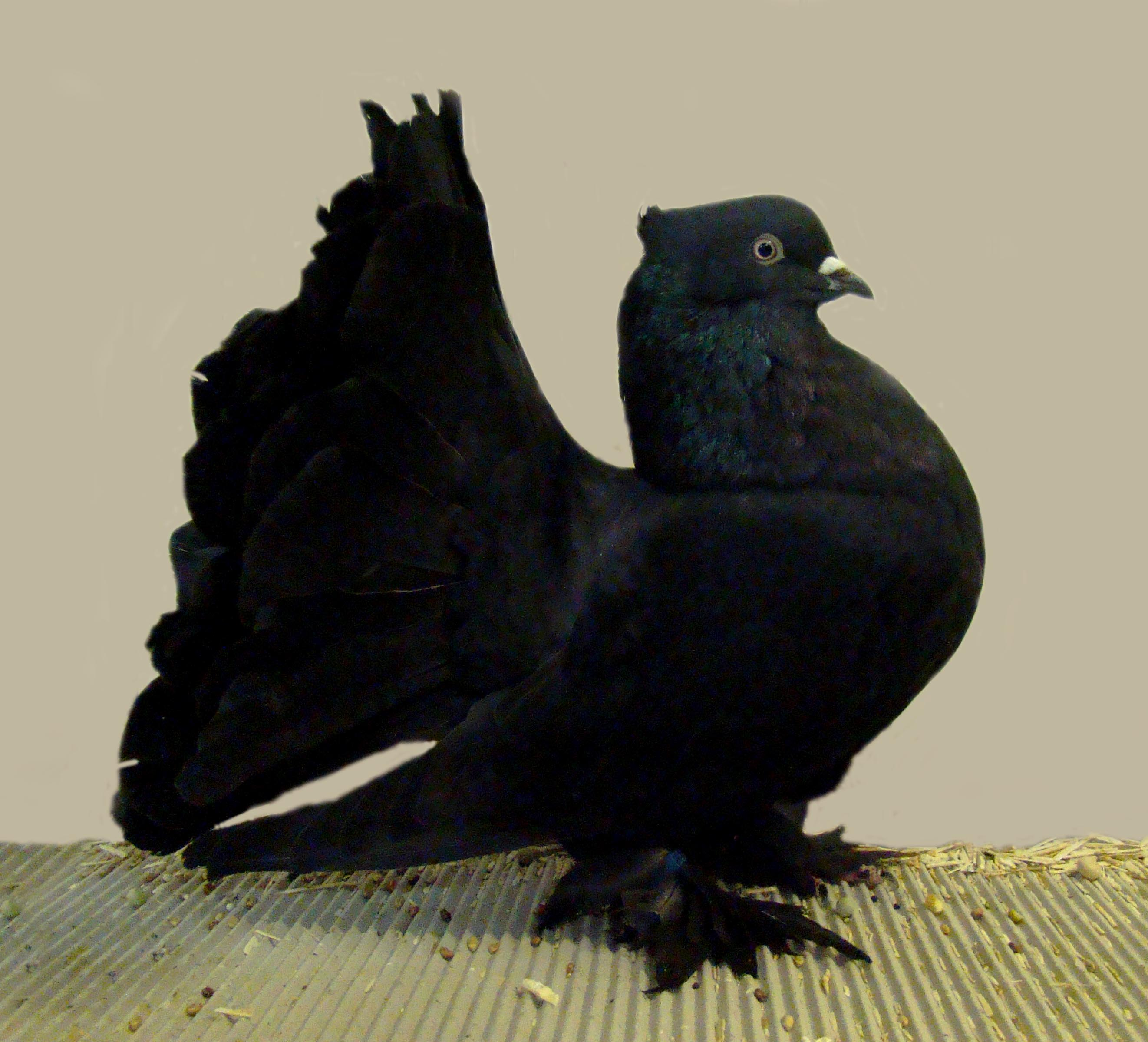
Black Indian fantail

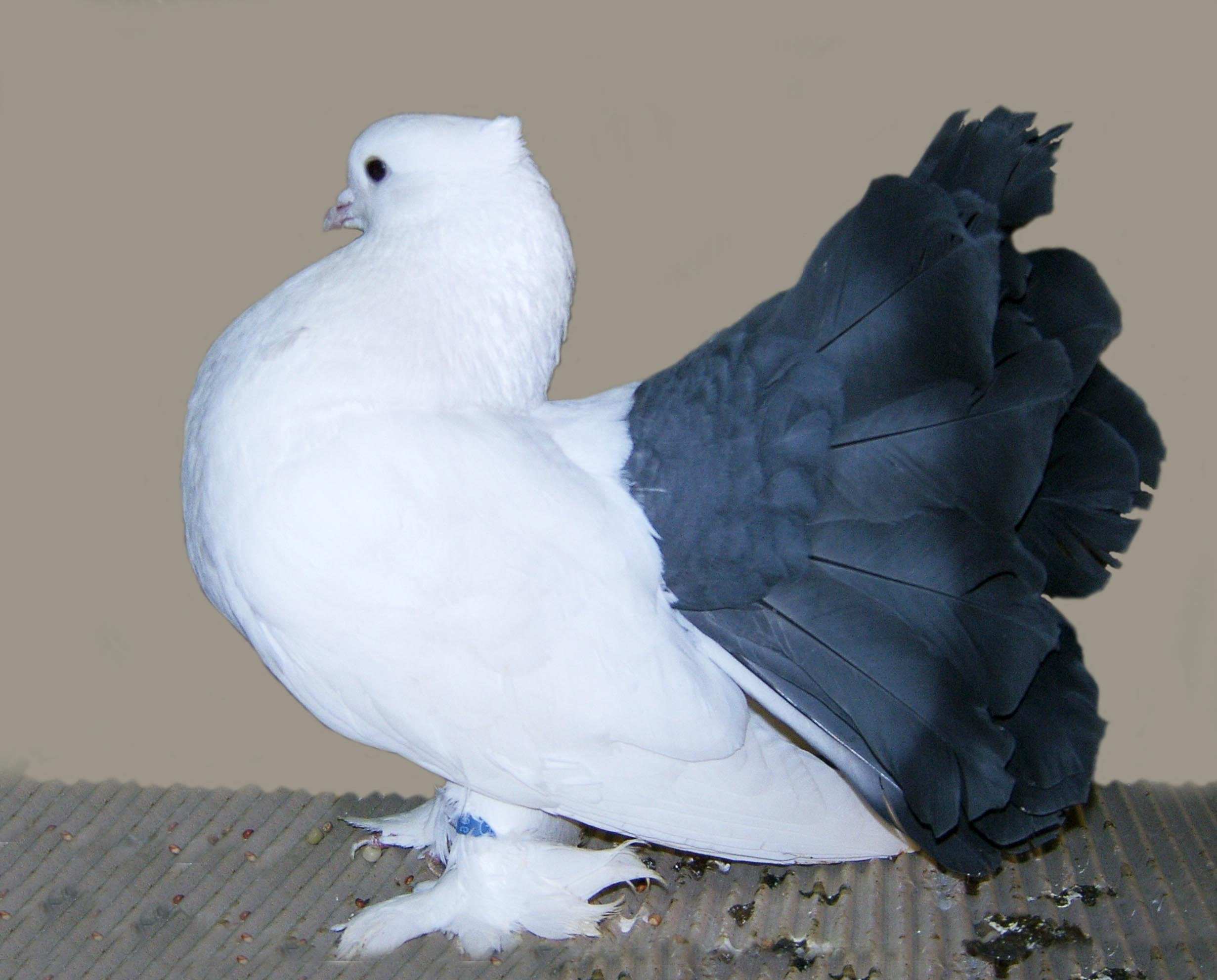
Tail marked Indian Fantail
- Indian Gola
- Indian Pearl Highflier
- Iranian Highflying Breeds
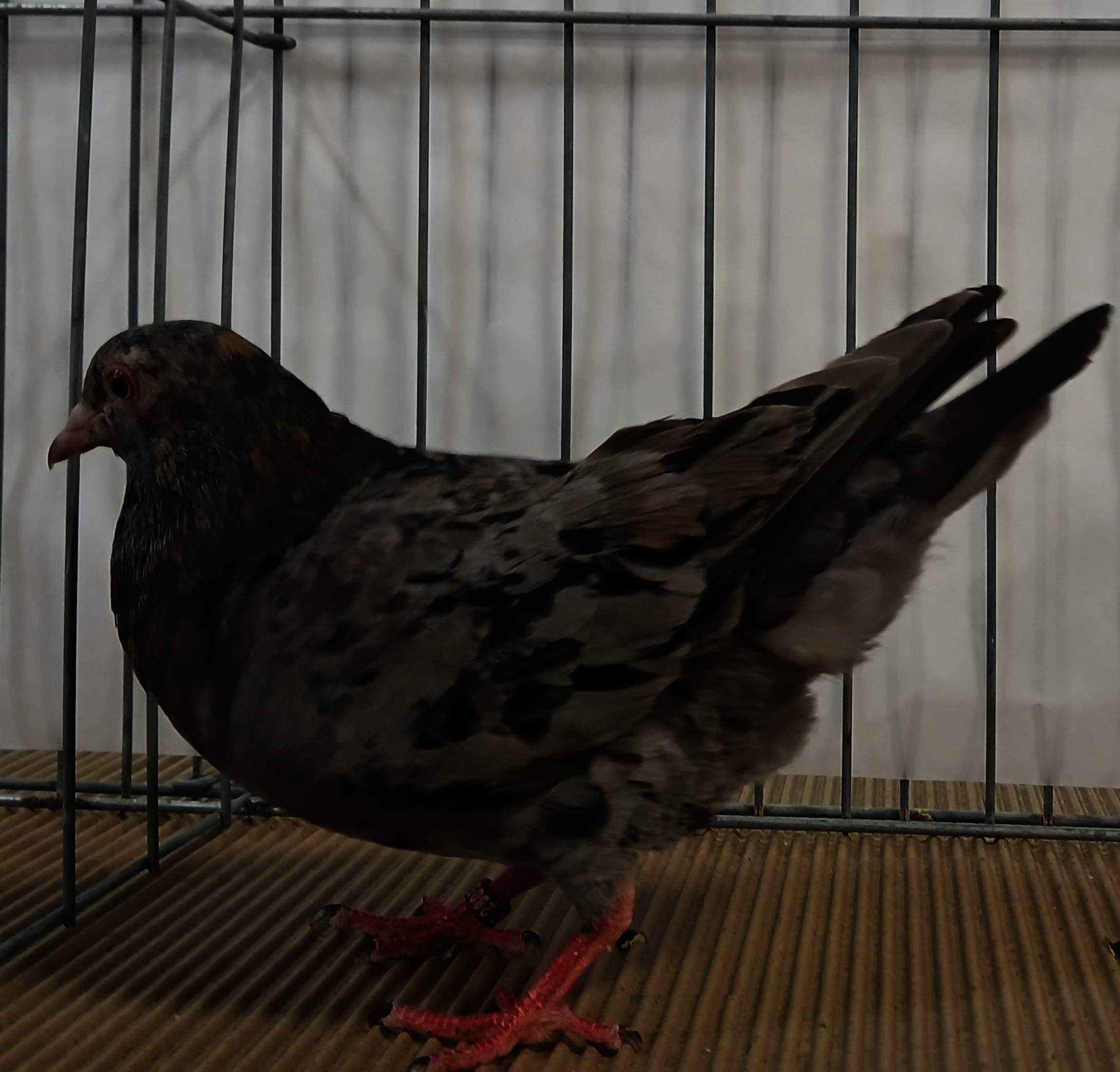
Iranian Highflyer Almond

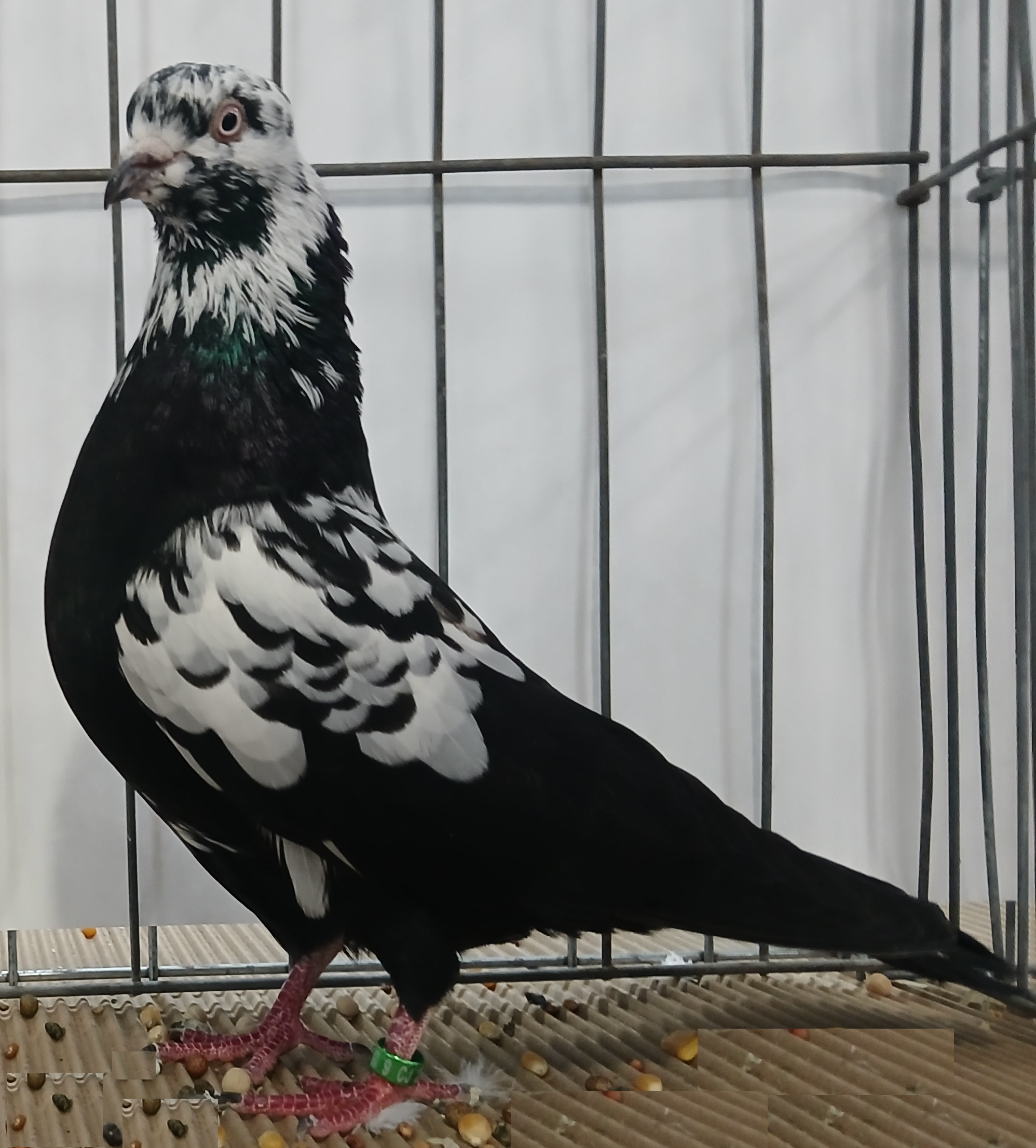
Iranian Highflyer Black Splash
- Irish Flying Tumbler
- Italian Owl pigeon (I/706)
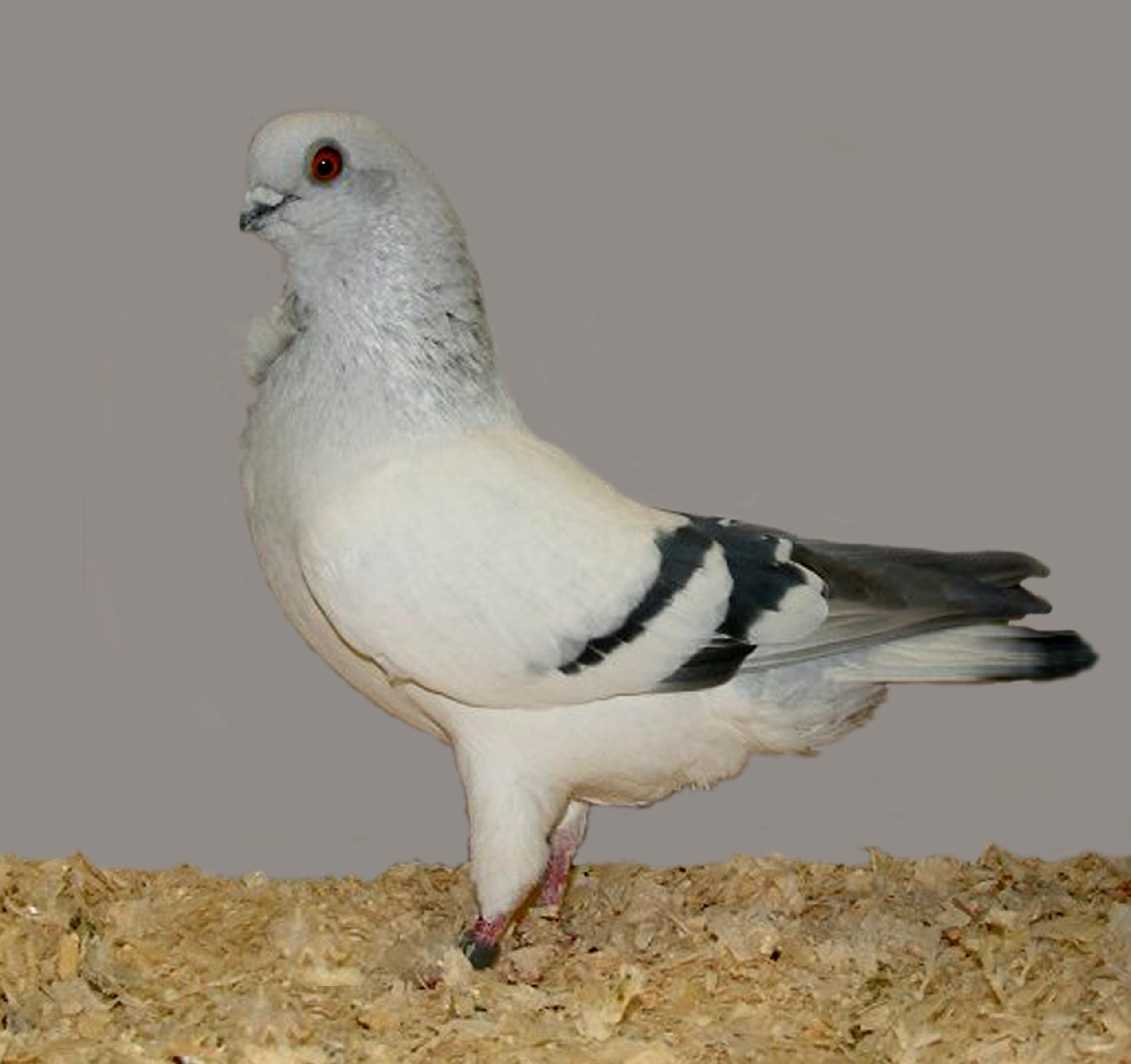
Ice Italian Owl

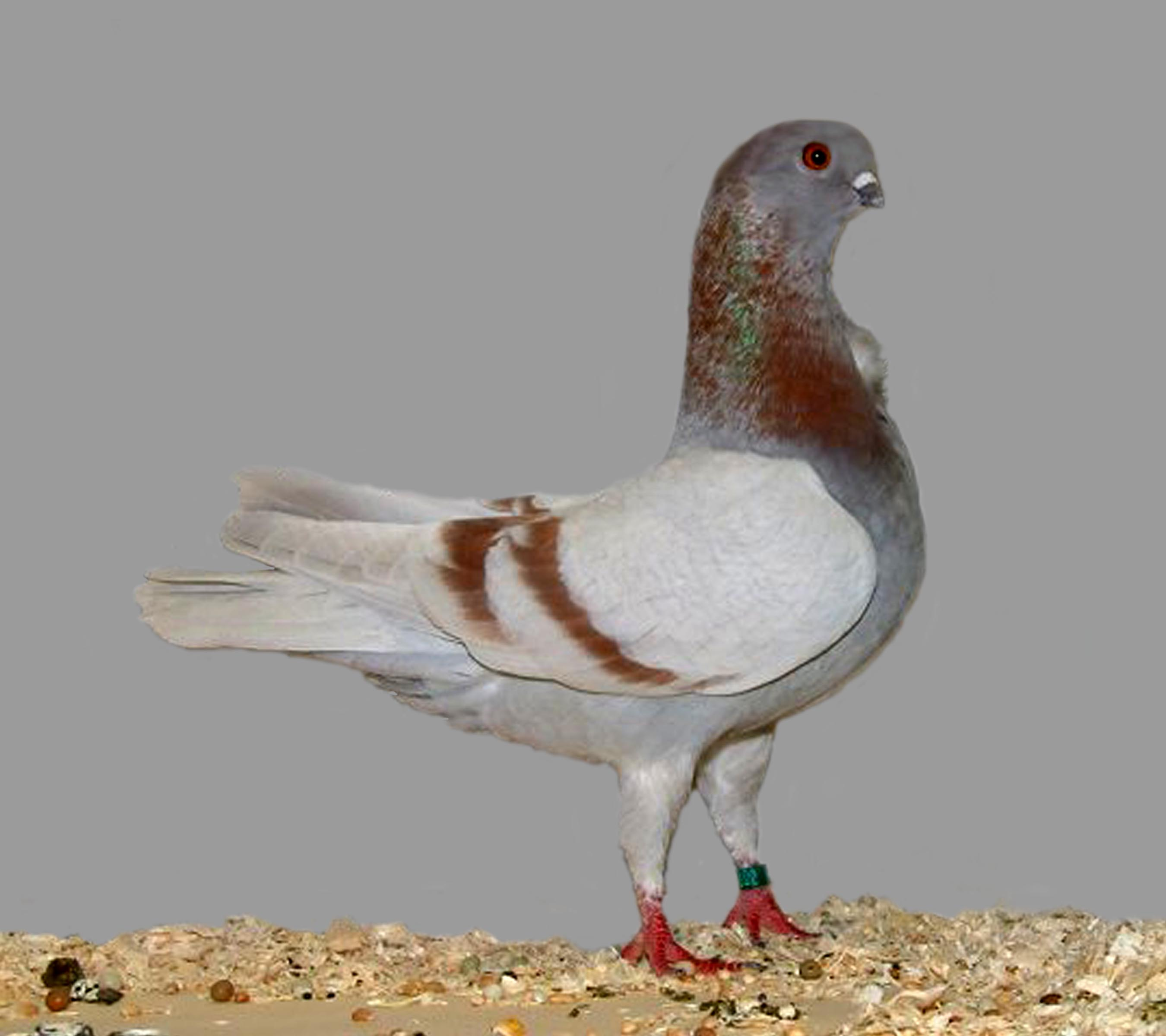
Red bar Italian Owl
- Italian Sottobanca (I/019)
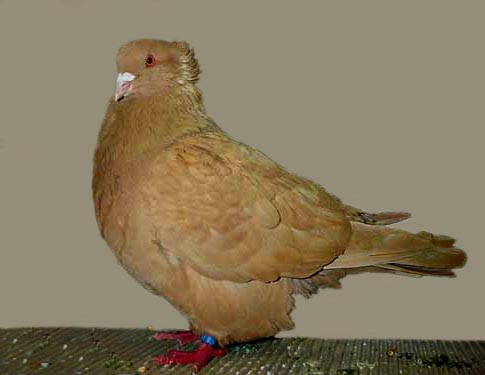
Yellow Sottobanca

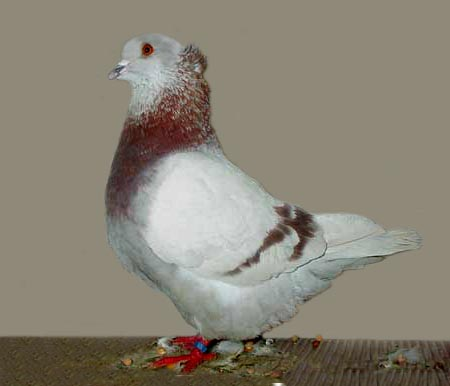
Red bar Sottobanca

== J ==
- Jacobin (GB/605)
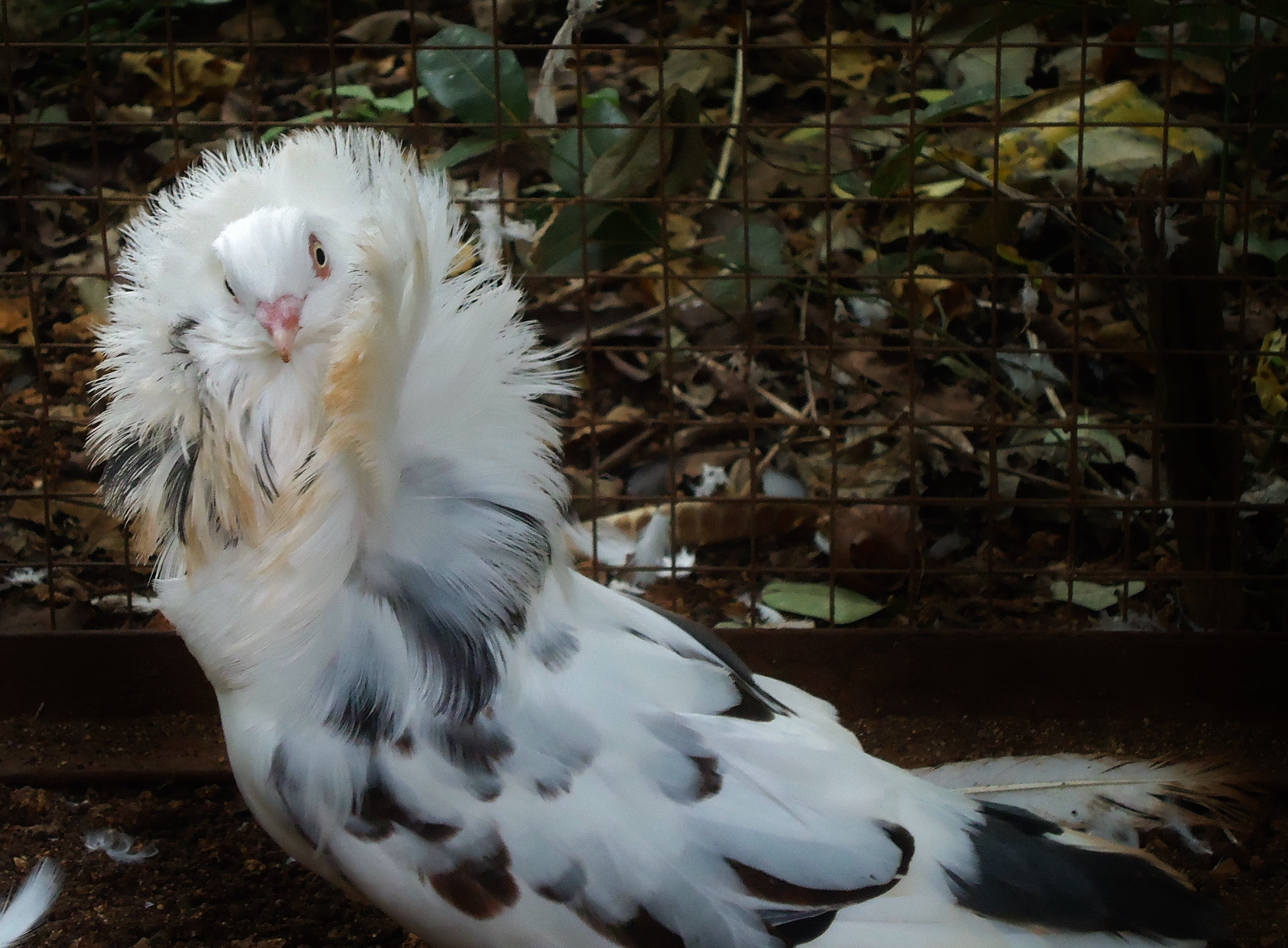
Pied Jacobin

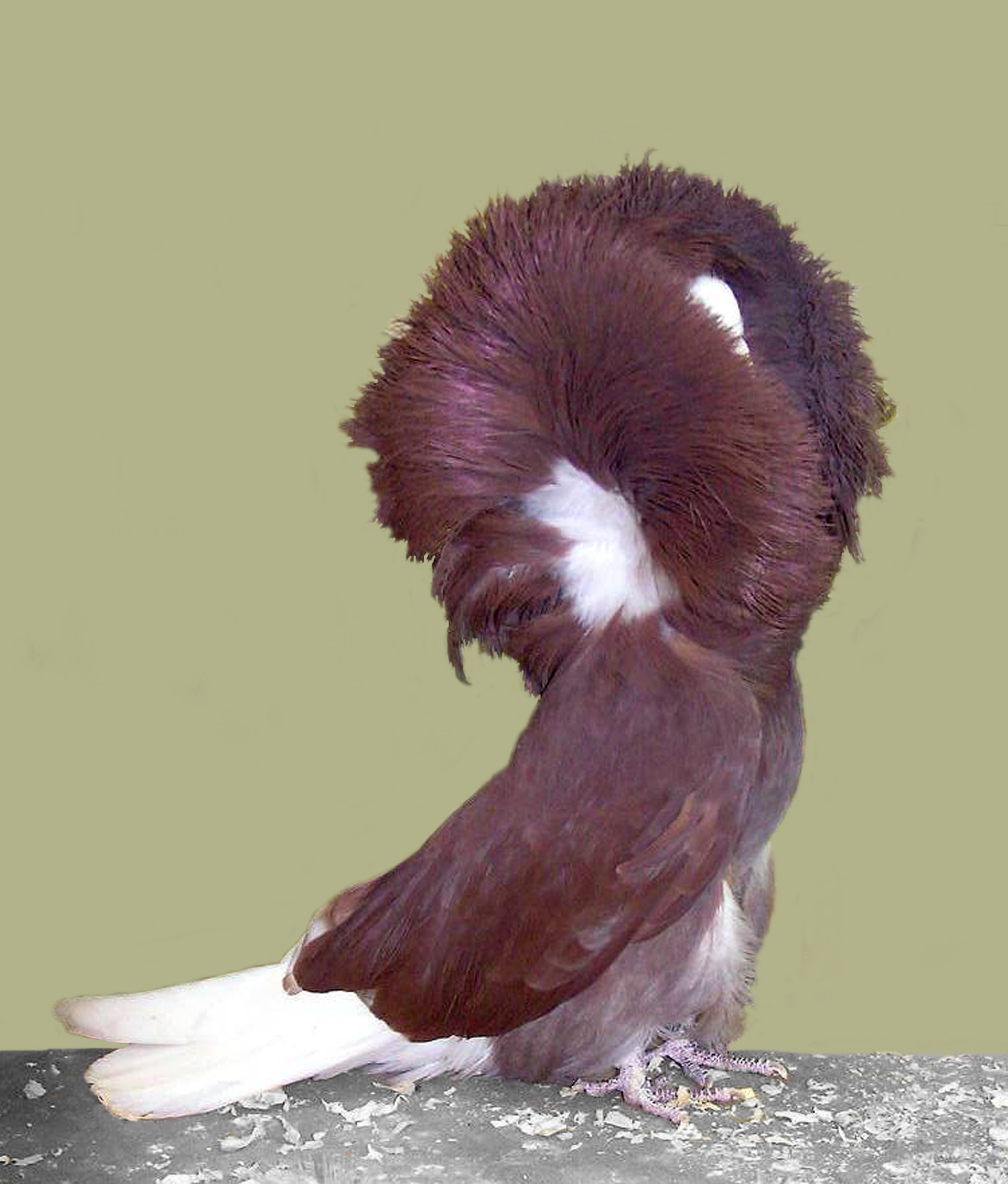
Red Jacobin
- Jassy Tumbler (RO/862)
- Jerezano Pouter
- Jewel Mondain
- Jiennense Cropper (E/340)

== K ==
- Kaluga Tumbler (RUS/869)
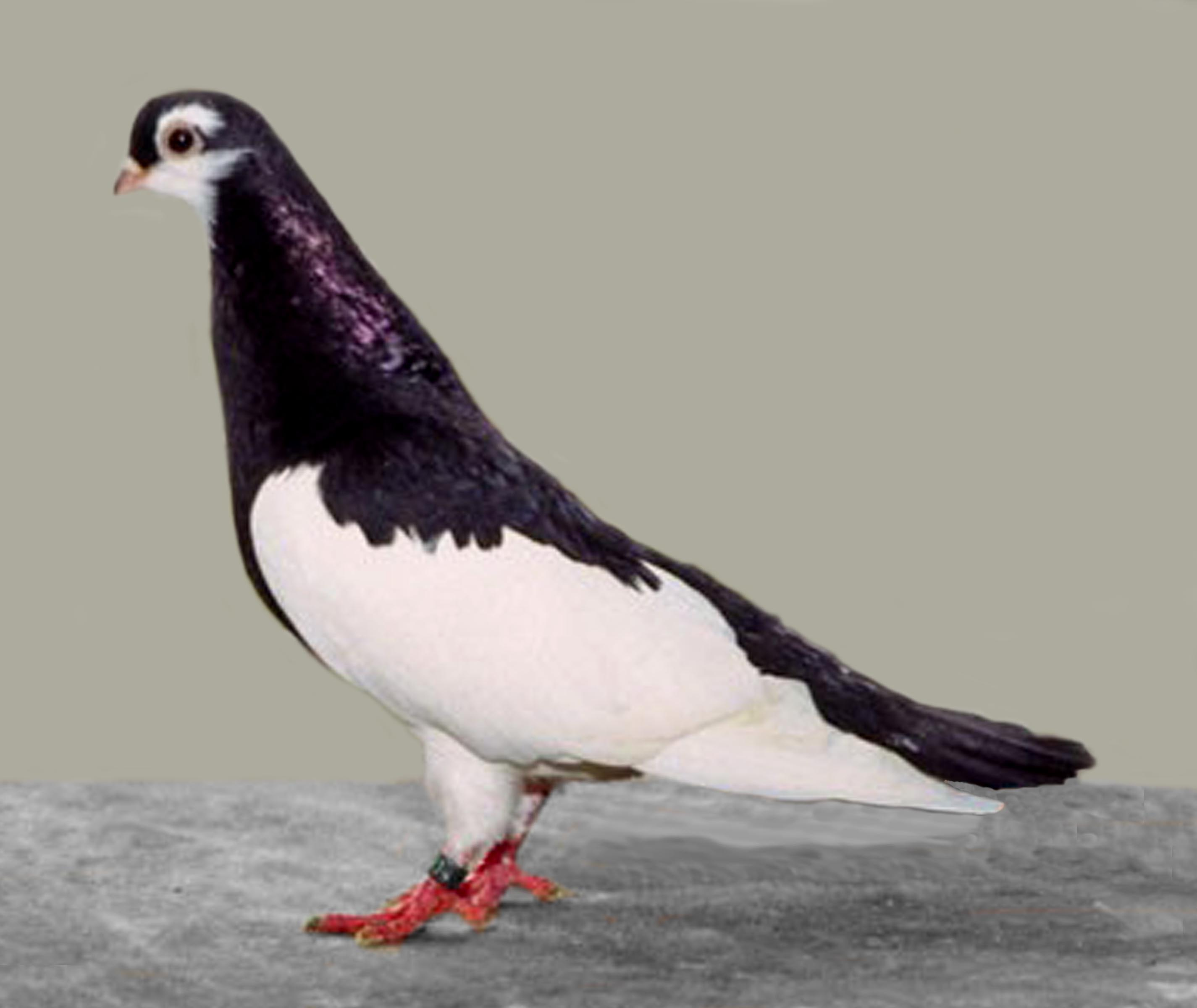
Black Kaluga Tumbler
- Karakand Fantail
- Kassel Tumbler (D/803)
- Katal
- Kazan Tumbler (RUS^{(D)}/868)
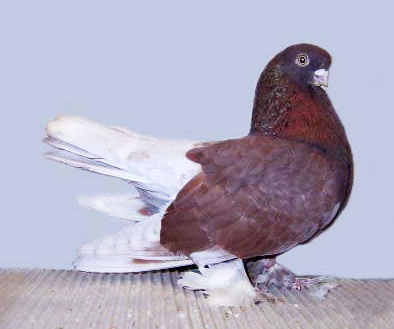
Red Kasaner Tumbler
- Kecskemét Tumbler (H/943)
- Kelebek
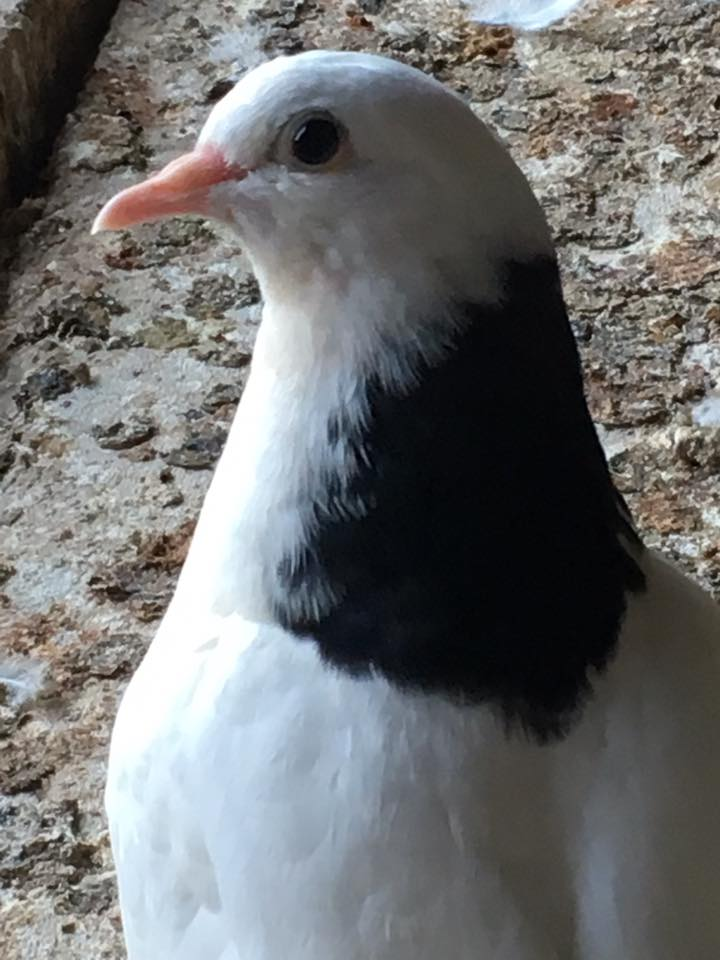
Kebelek Güvercin
- Kiev Tumbler (RUS^{(D)}/891)
- King pigeon (ESKT/204)
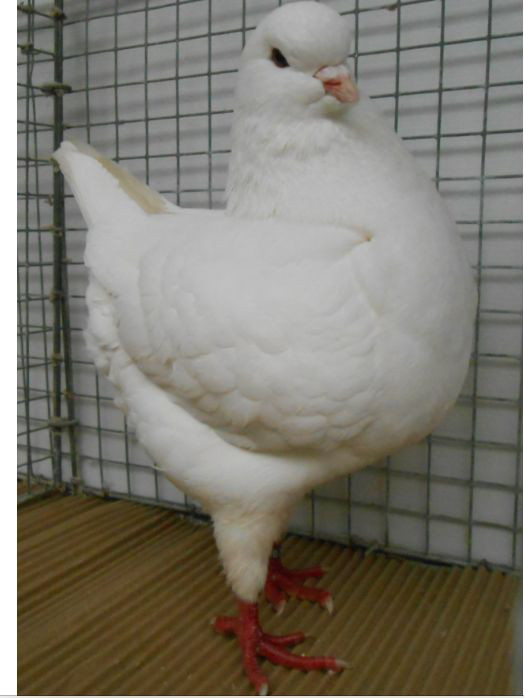
White

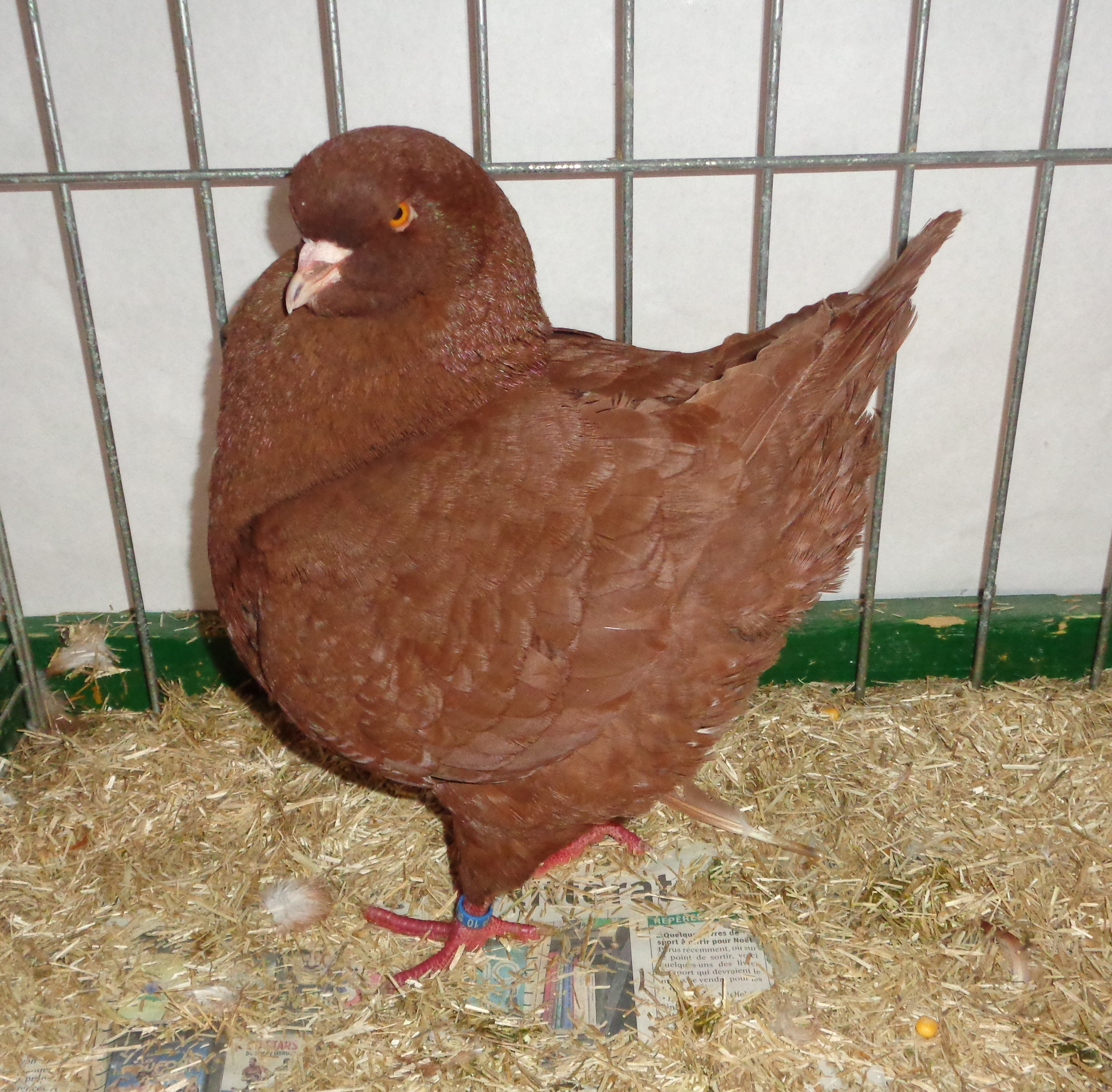
Red

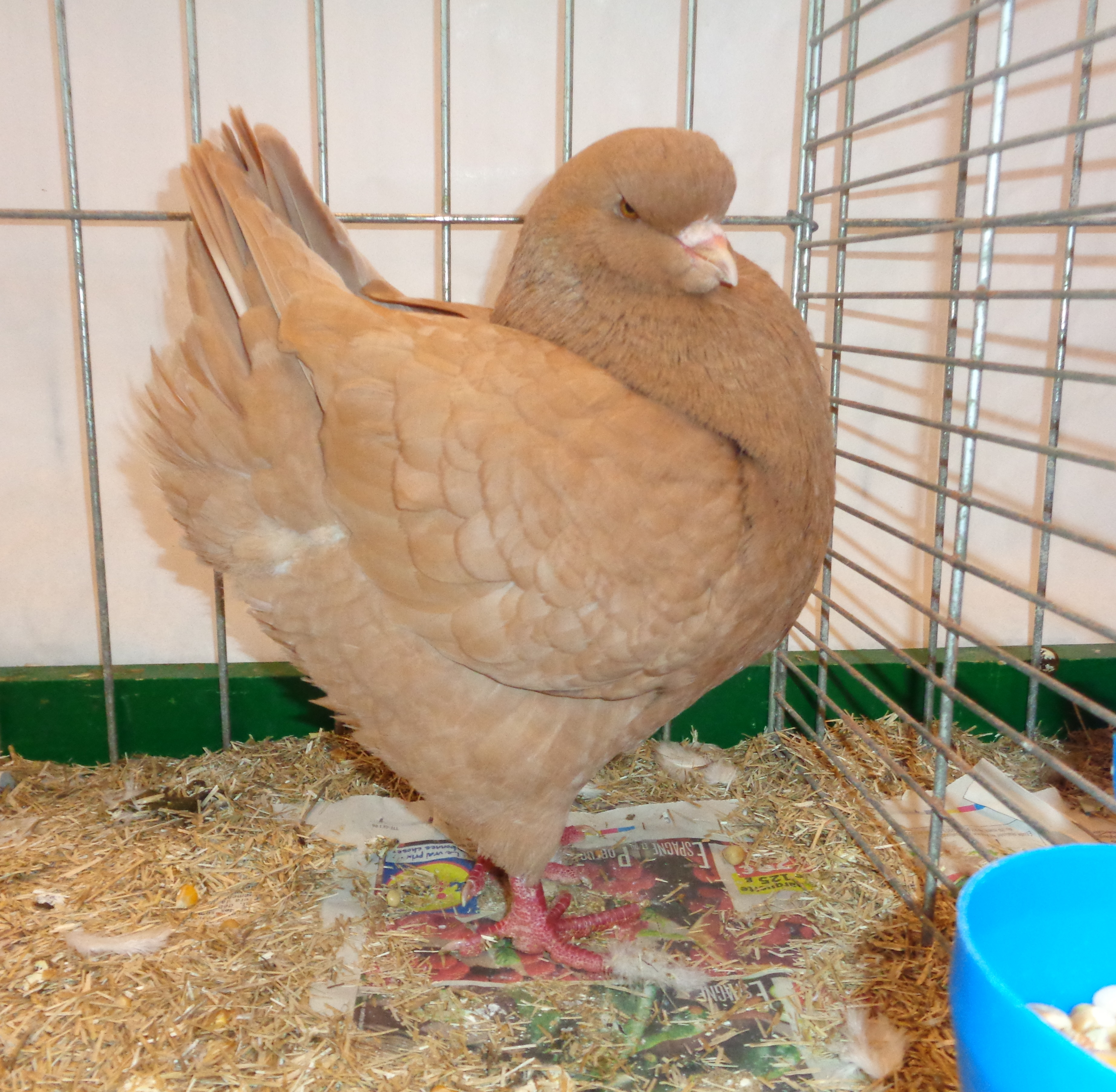
Yellow
- Kiskunfelegyhaza Tumbler (H/944)
- Königsberg Colour-head Tumbler (D/905)
- Koenigsberg Moorhead
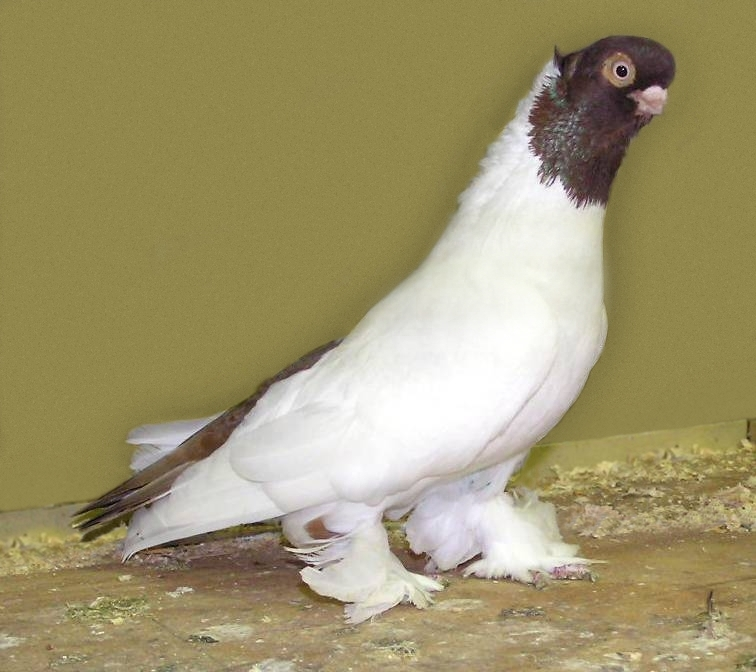
Red Konigsberg Morehead

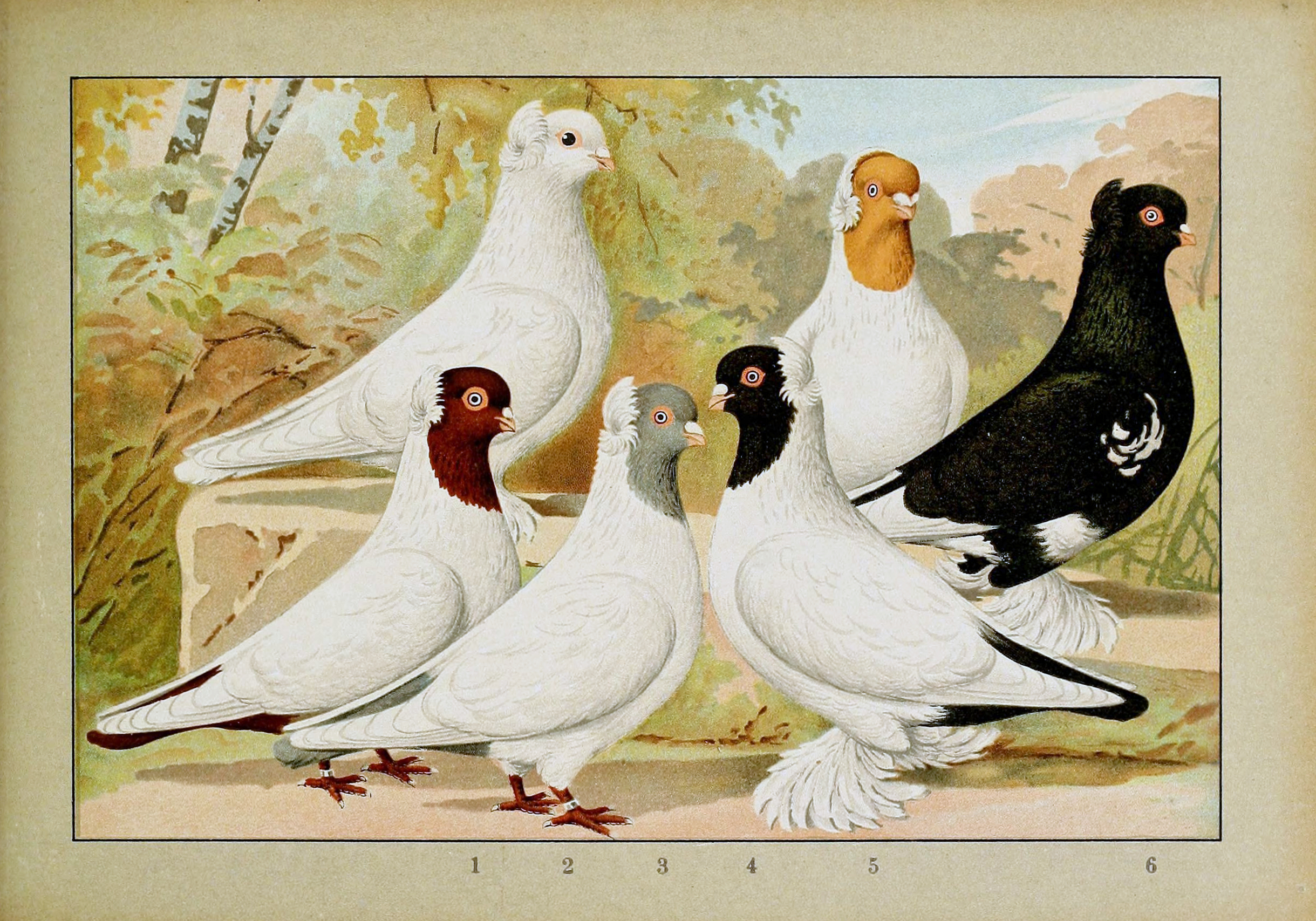
Schachtzabel 1906 Tafel 94
- Koenigsberg Reinaugen Tumbler (D/906)
- Komorn Tumbler (H/857)
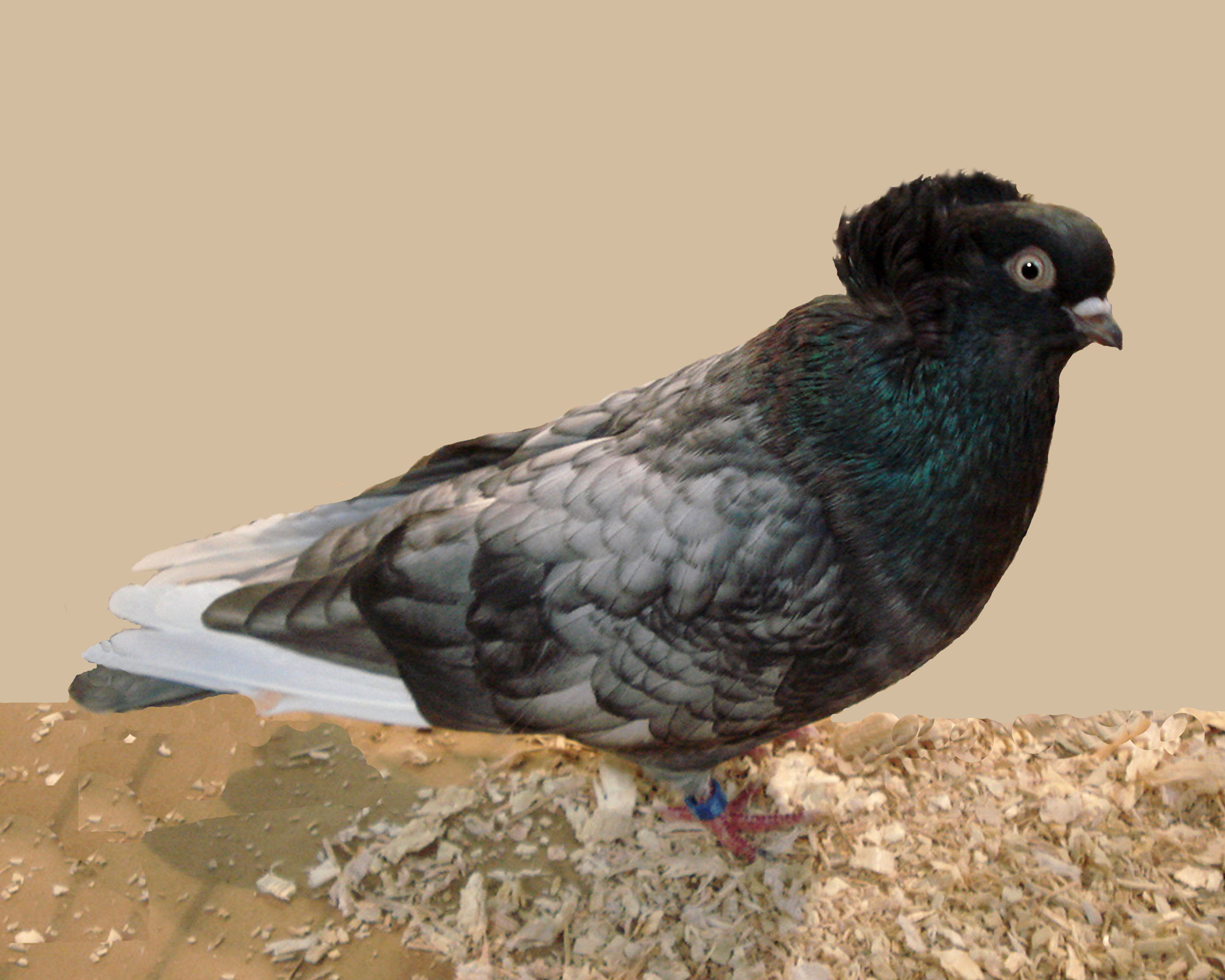
Andalusian Komorner Tumbler
- Konstanza Tumbler (RO/1003)
- Koros Tumbler (H/864)
- Kosice Roller (SK/931)
- Kosice Tumbler (SK/930)
- Kraków Magpie pigeon (PL/808)
- Krasnodar Tumbler (RUS^{(D)}/949)

== L ==
- Lacene (GB/409)
- Lahore (D/037)
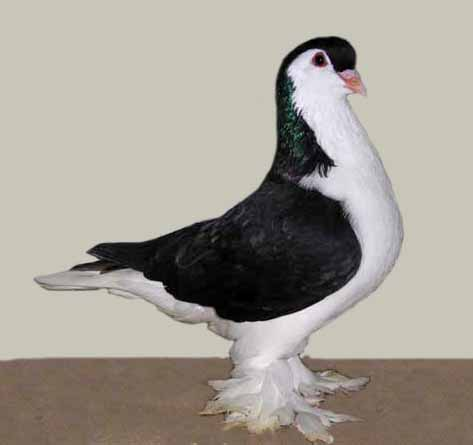
Black Lahore
- Laudino Sevillano Cropper (E/338)
- Lebanon (D/038)
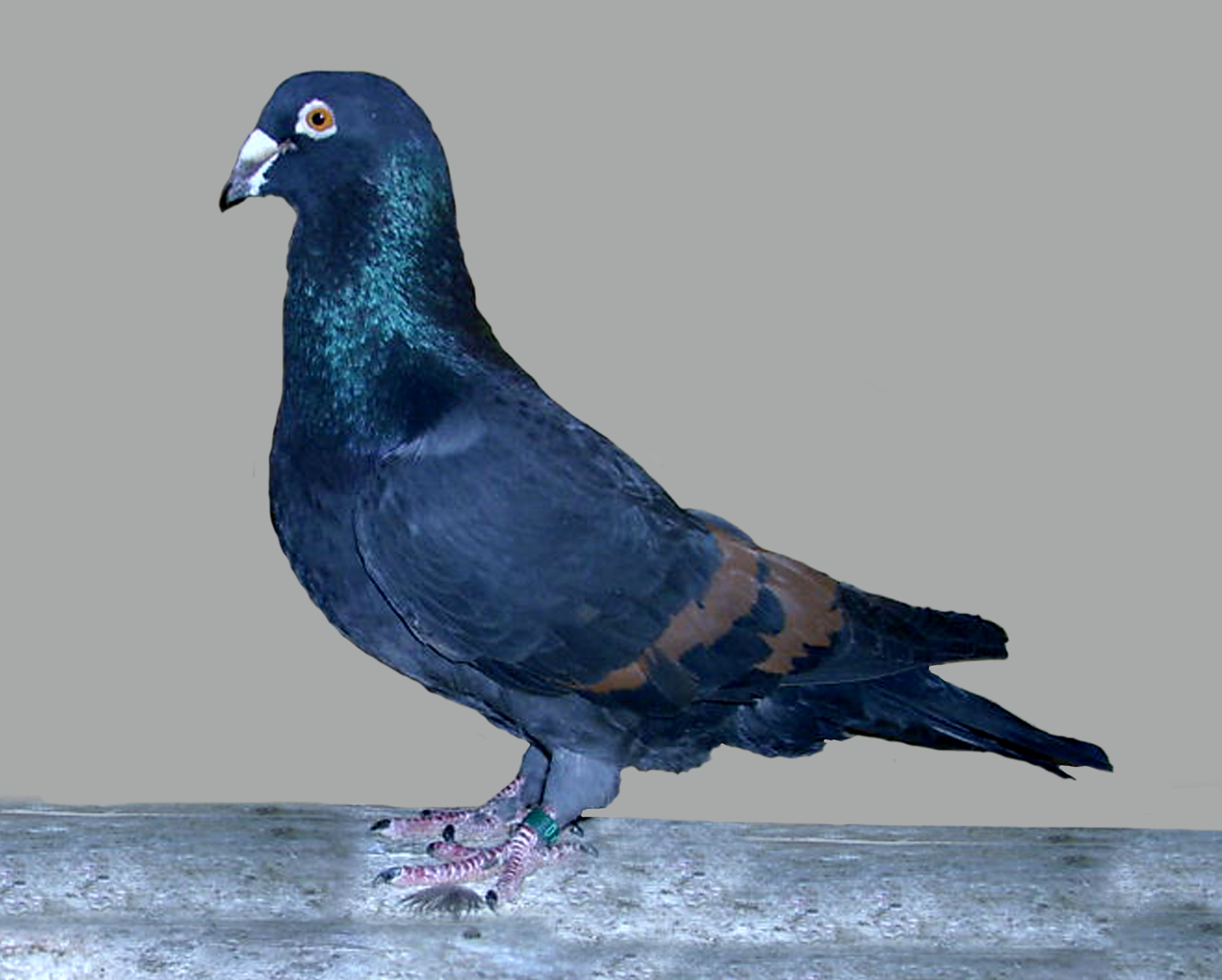
Bronze Bar Lebanon
- Lenardo
- Leuven Pouter (B/313)
- Lille Pouter (B/328)
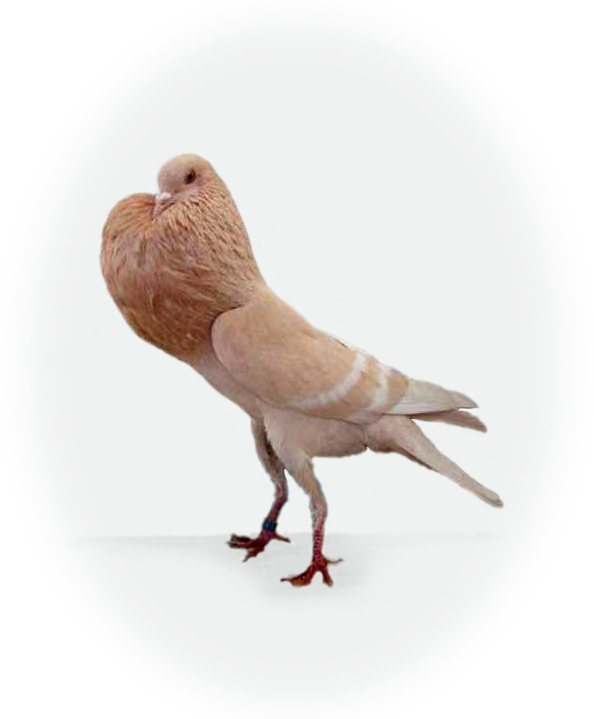
Lille Pouter
- Lille Tumbler (F/1006)
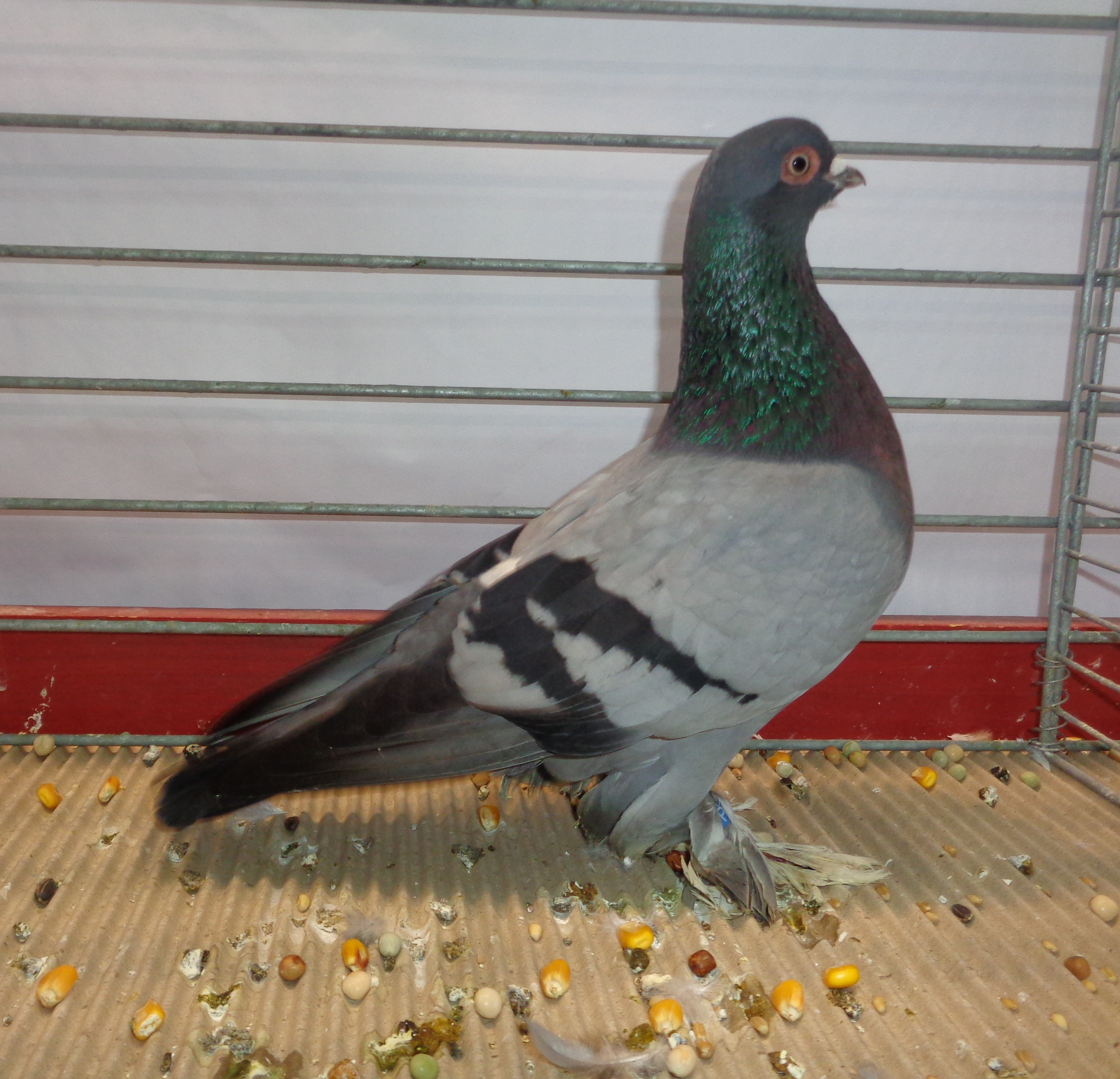
Blue bar Lilly (Lillois) Tumbler
- Limerick Tumbler (IRL/1001)
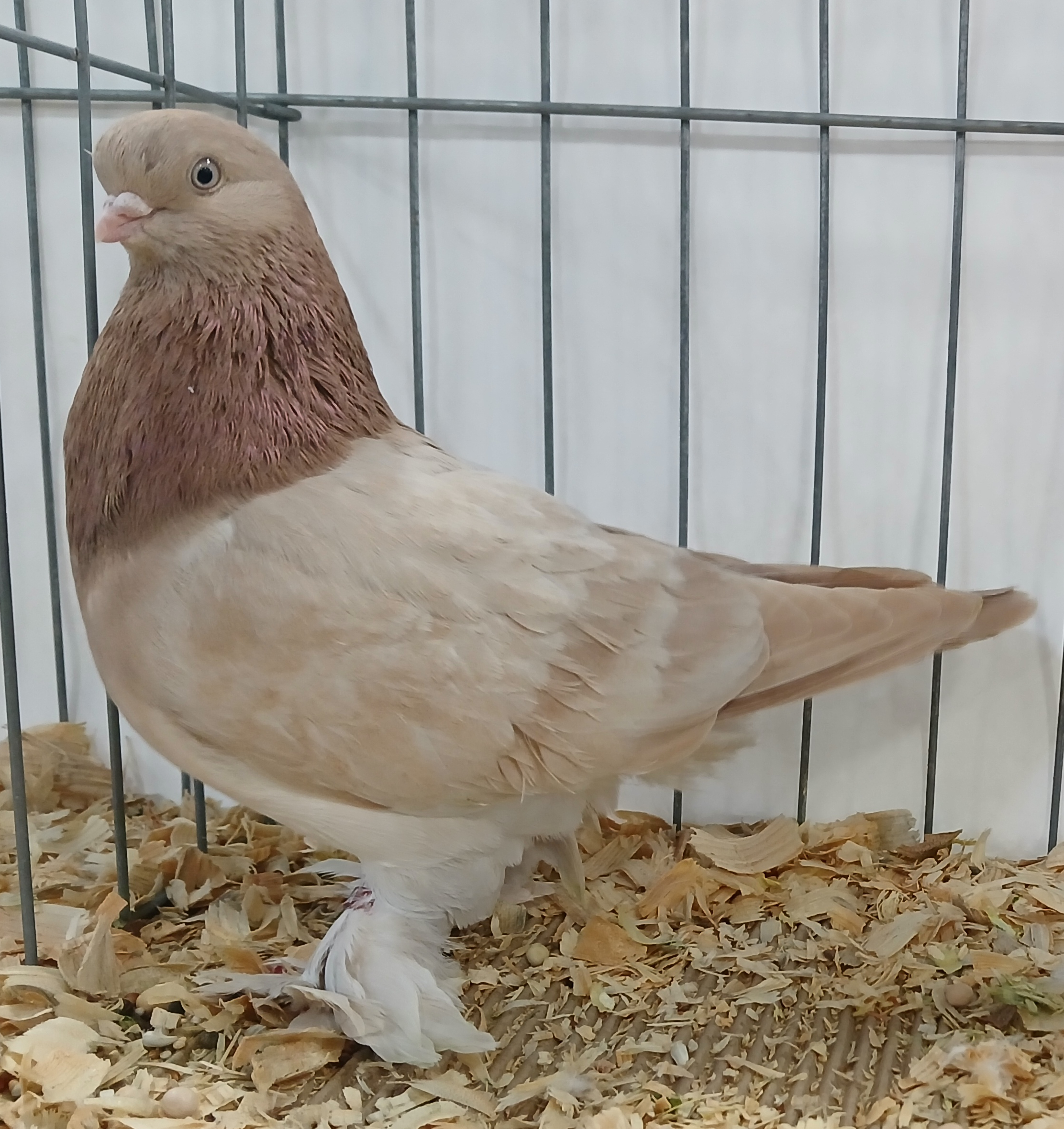
Limerick Tumbler
- Lome Tumbler (BG/989)
- Lower Bavarian Cropper (D/346)
- Low Silesian Muffed Tumbler (PL/961)
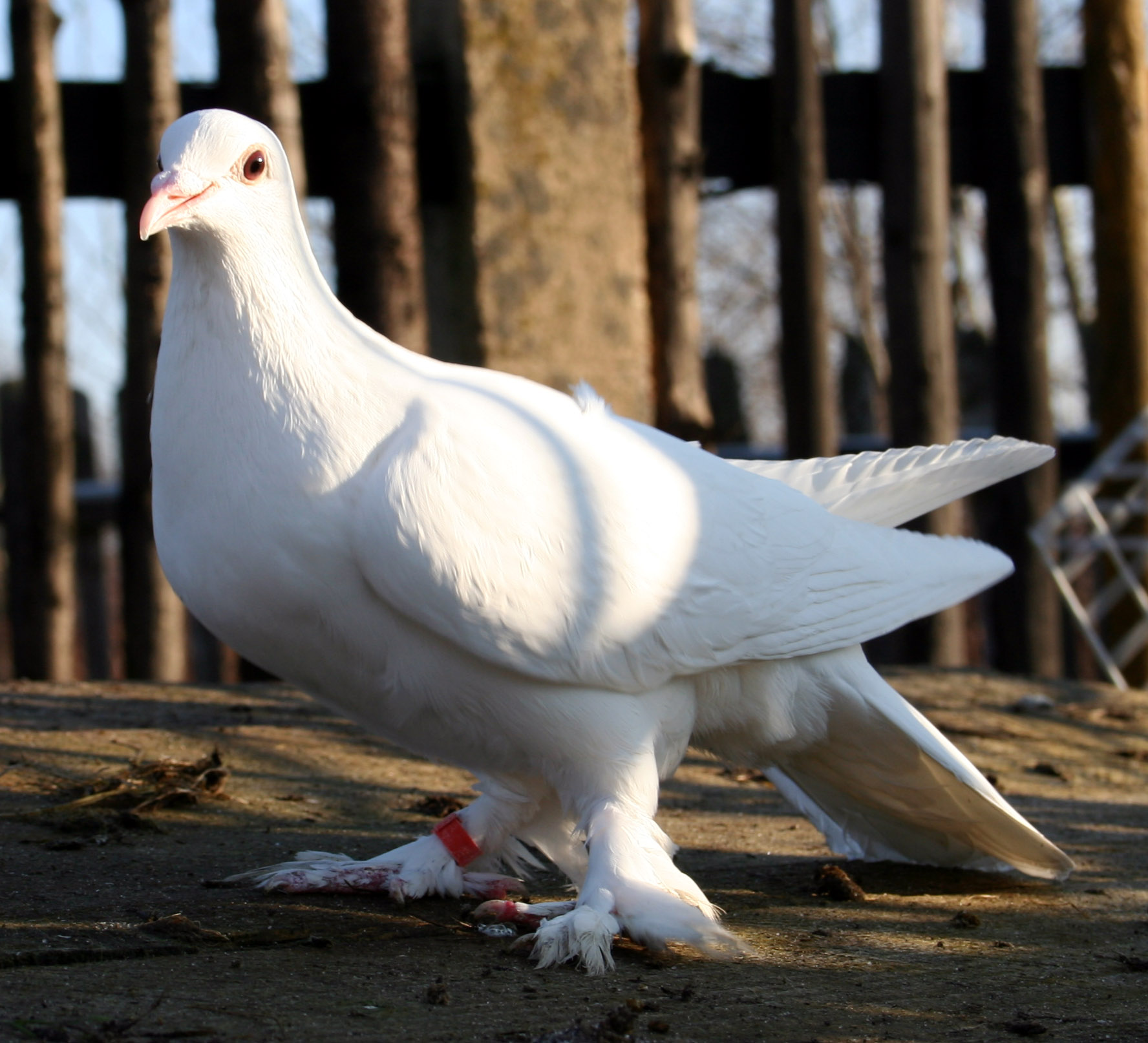
White Lower Silesian Tumbler
- Lucerne Copper Collar (CH/420)
- Lucerne Elmer (CH/418)
- Lucerne Gold Collar (CH/421)
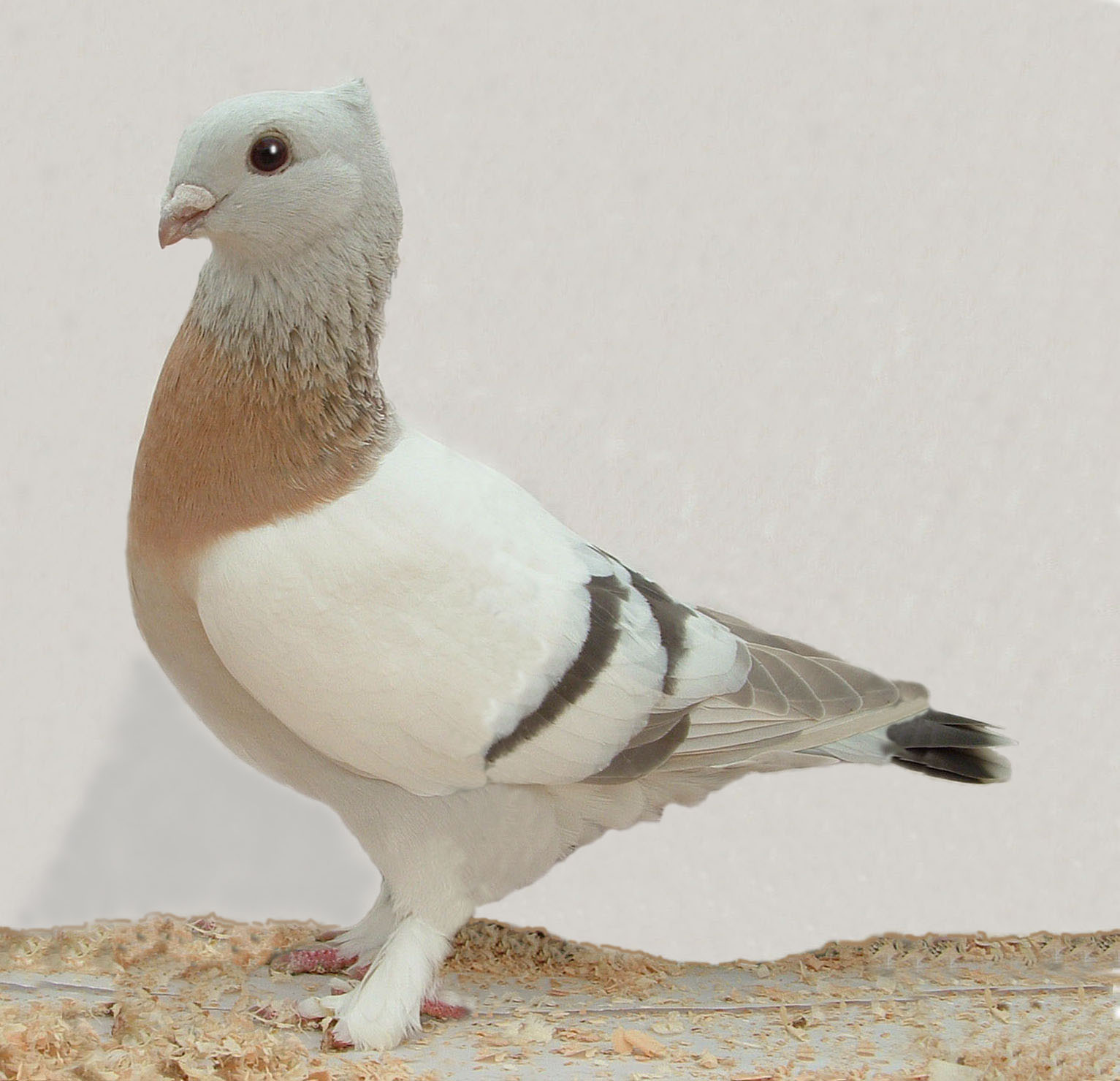
Lucerne Gold Collar

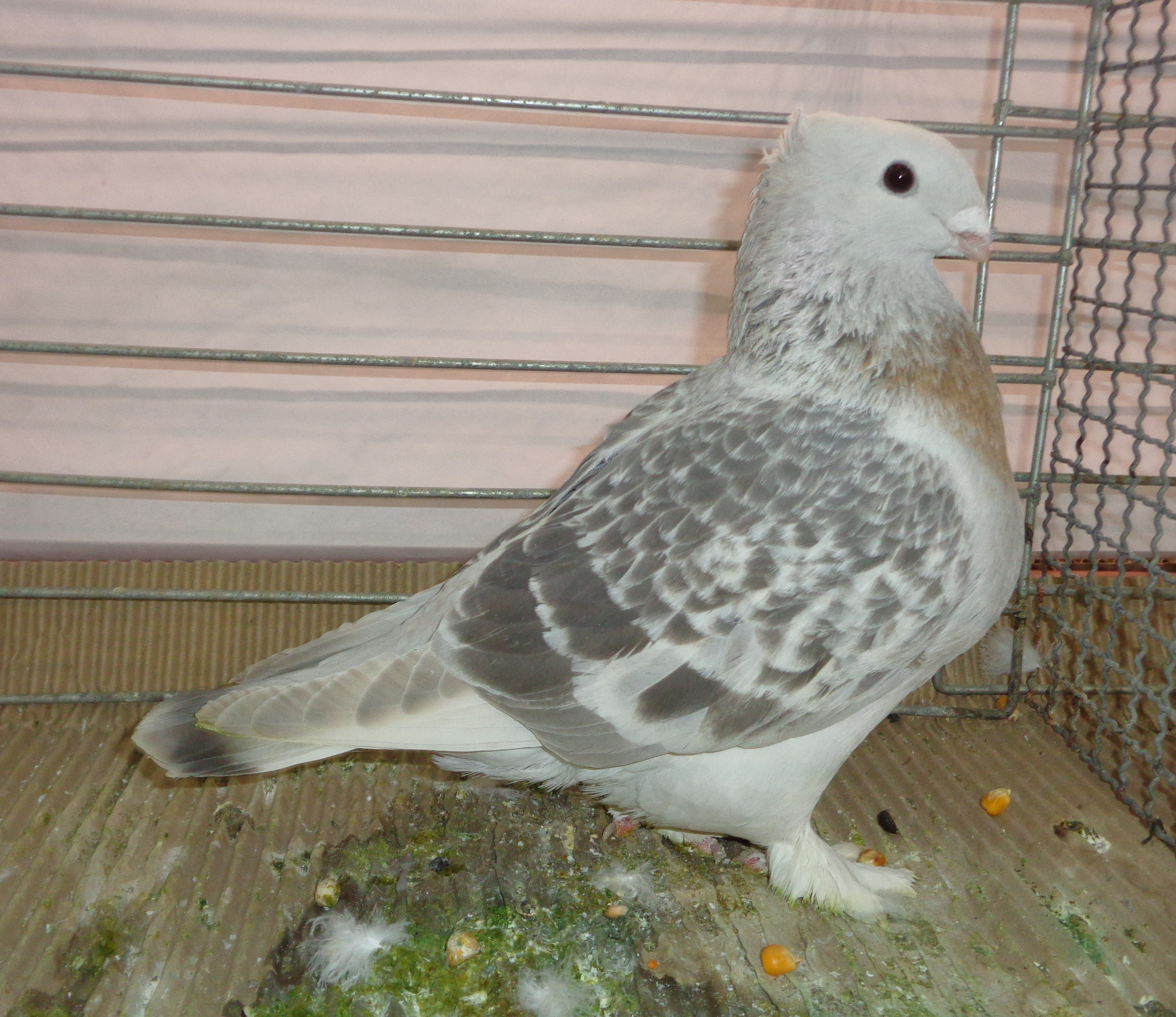
Lucerne reduced Blue Check

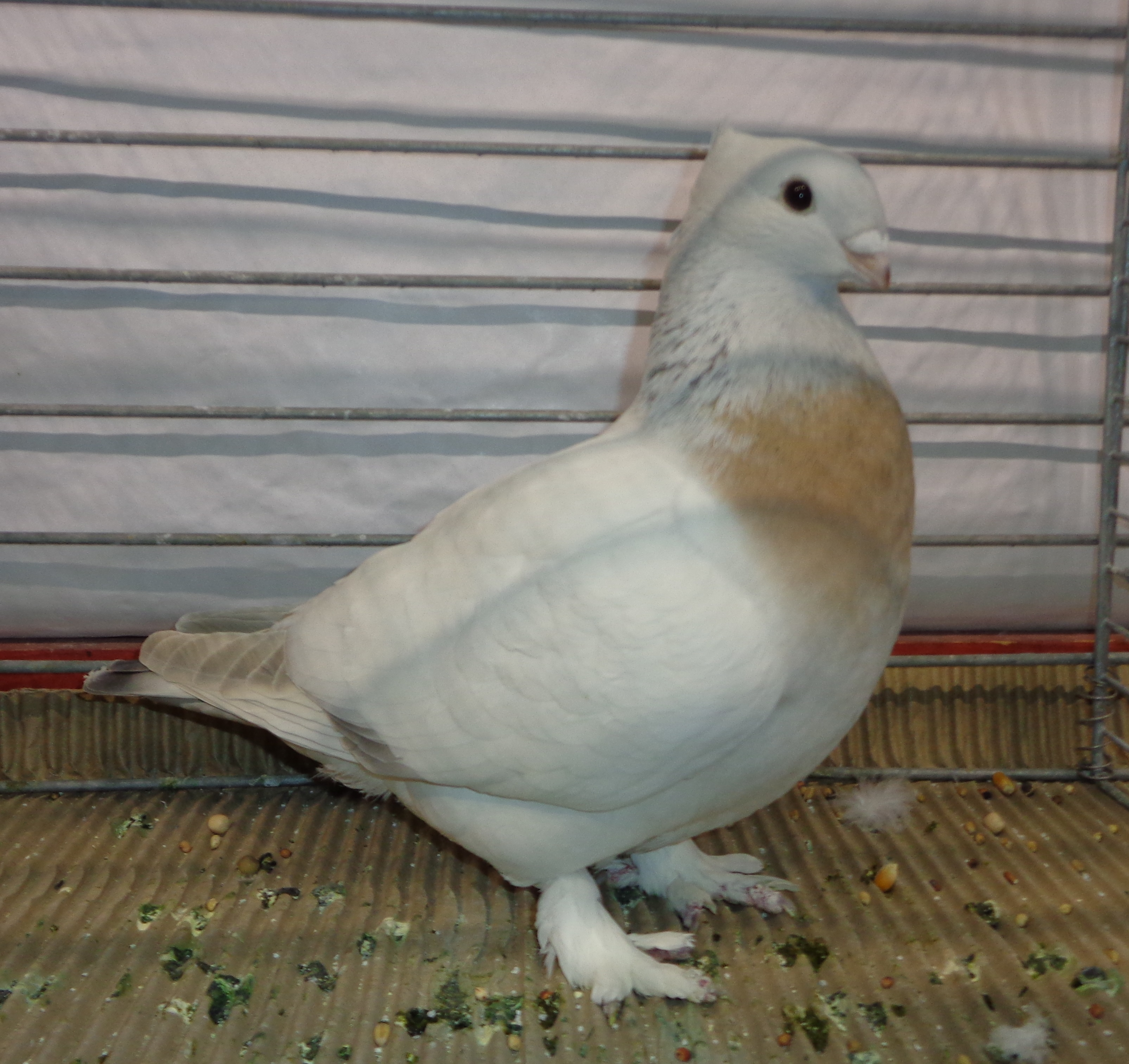
Lucerne Barless
- Lucerne Self (CH/417)
- Lucerne Shield (CH/419)
- Lucerne Tiger-head (CH/422)
- Lucerne White-tail (CH/423)
- Lugoj Roller (BG/990)
- Lusatian Tumbler (D/953)
- Luster Pigeon (D/487)
- Luttich Owl pigeon (B/719)

== M ==
- Macedonian Owl
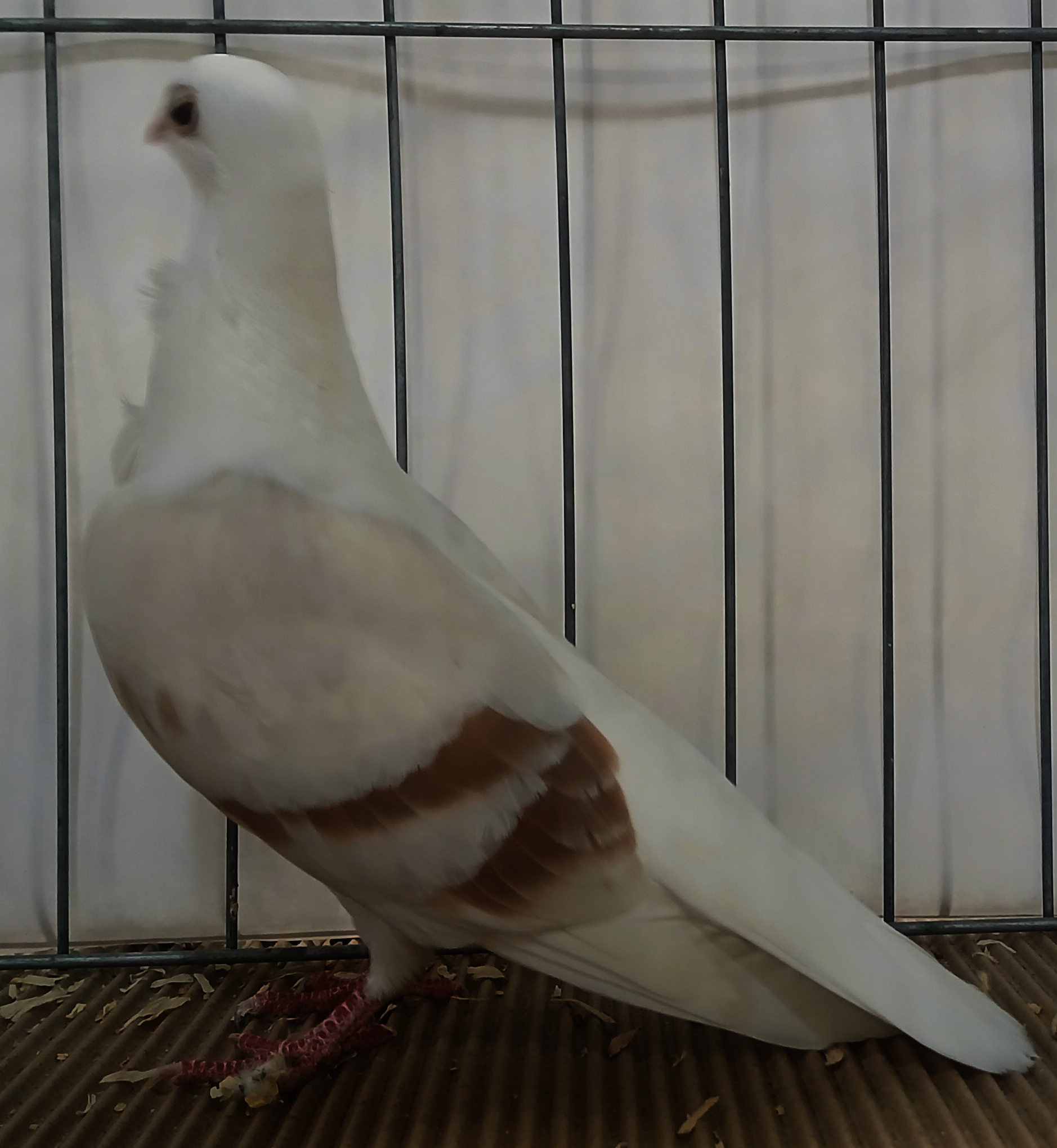
- Madrasi Highflyer
- MacRhyme Turbit
- Magpie pigeon → English Magpie pigeon (GB/807)
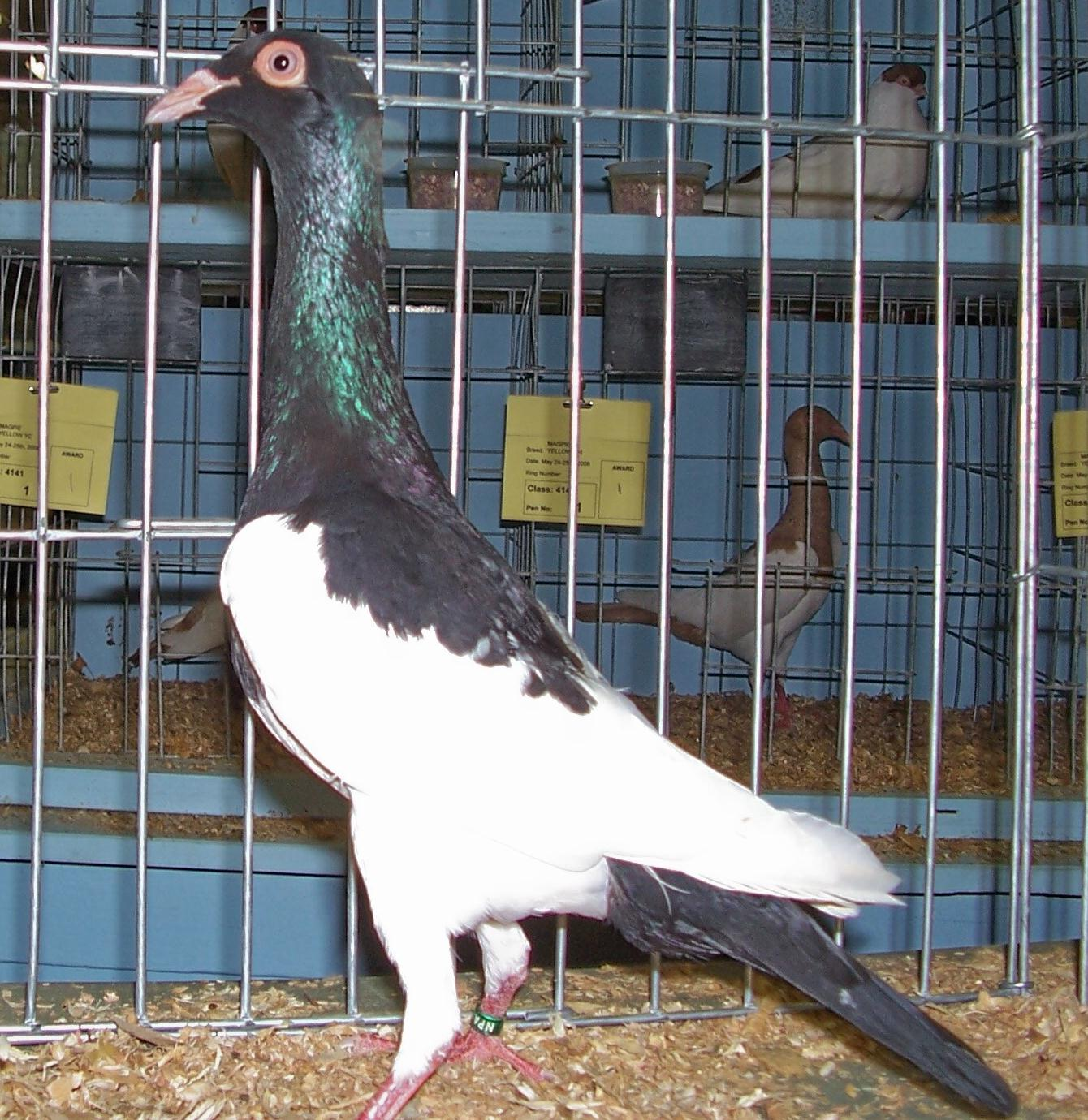
Black English Magpie
- Majorcan Bort Runt
- Majorcan Esbart Roller
- Makó Highflyer (H/957)
- Mallorca Giant Pigeon (E/058)
- Maltese (A/203)
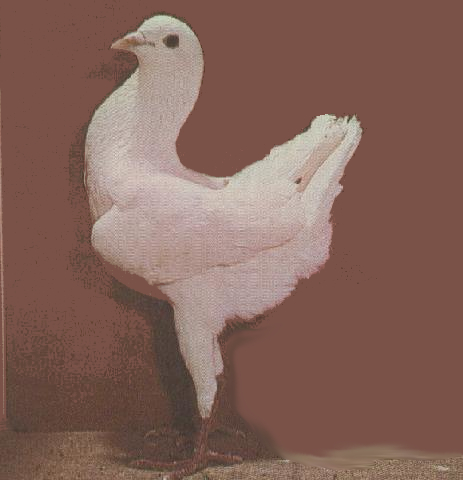
White Maltese
- Manotte (F/055)
- Marchenero Pouter (E/334)
- Mardin
- Mariola (P/056)
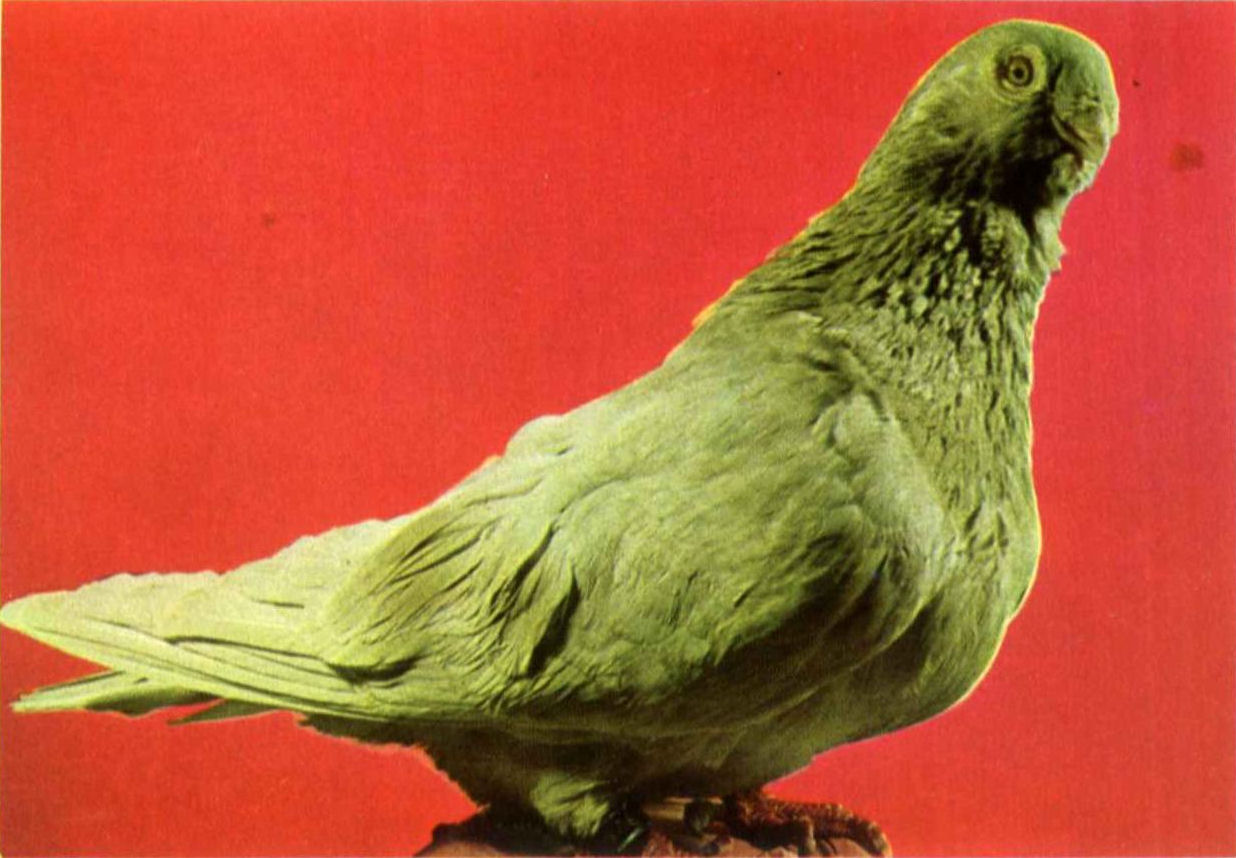
Mariola
- Mariolinha (P/057)
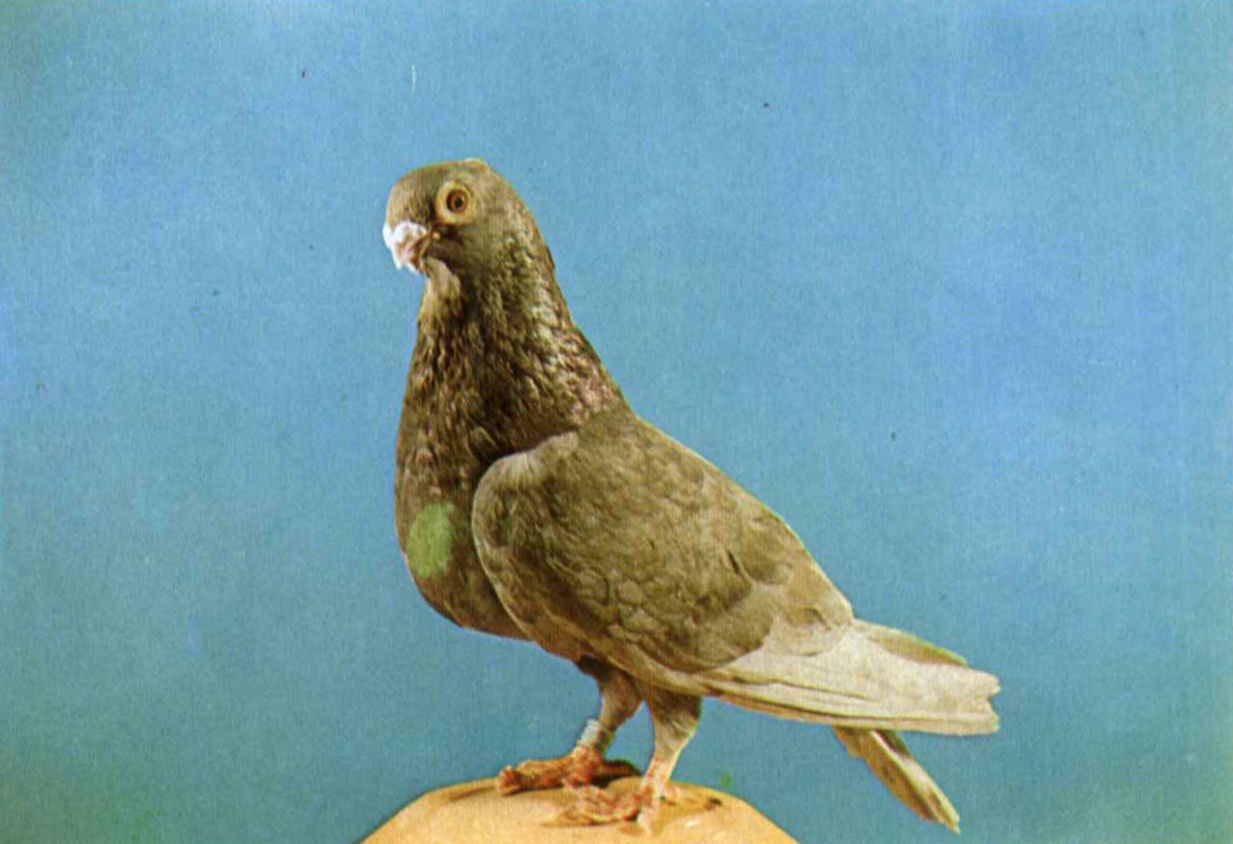
Mariolinha
- Markish Magpie Tumbler (D/902)
- Martham (GB/049)
- Masurian Tumbler (PL/961)
- McLennan's Aberdonian
- Međimurje Swallow Pigeon (Croatian: Međimurska lastavica)
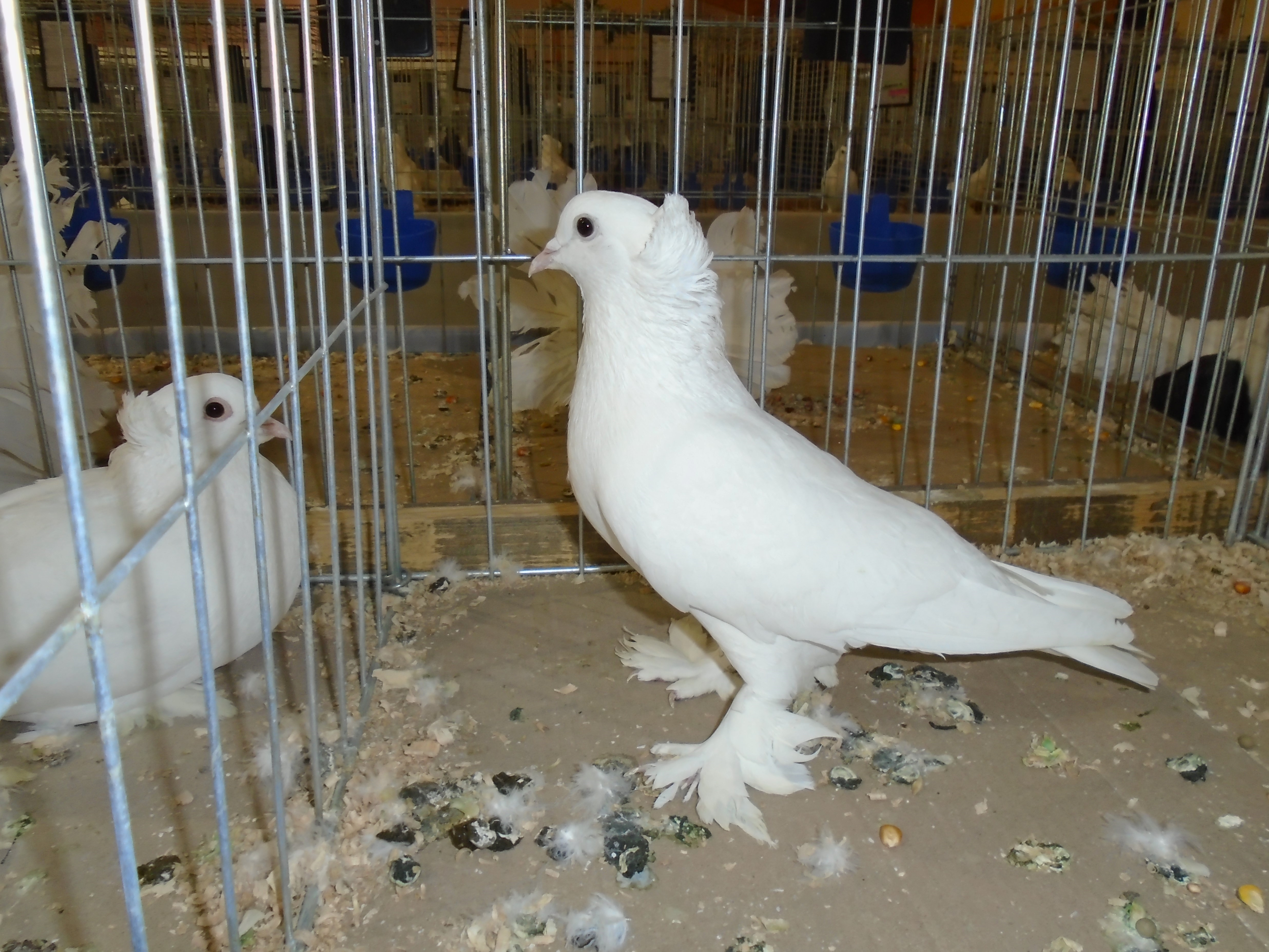
Međimurje Swallow Pigeon
- Megcer
- Memel Highflyer (D/815)
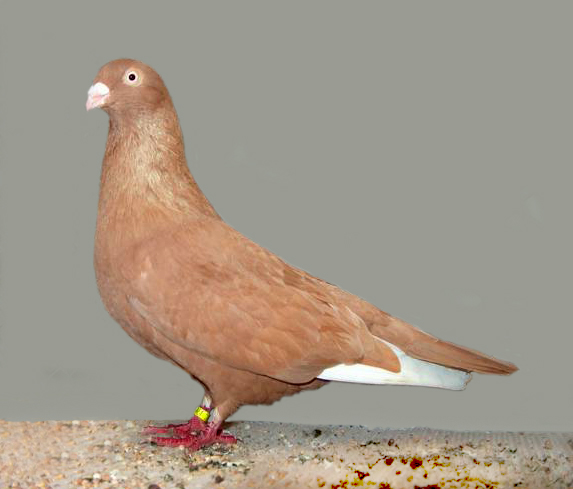
Yellow Memel Highflyer
- Micholaiyvski Shield Tumbler
- Miniature American Crested
- Mittelhause Pigeon (D/045)
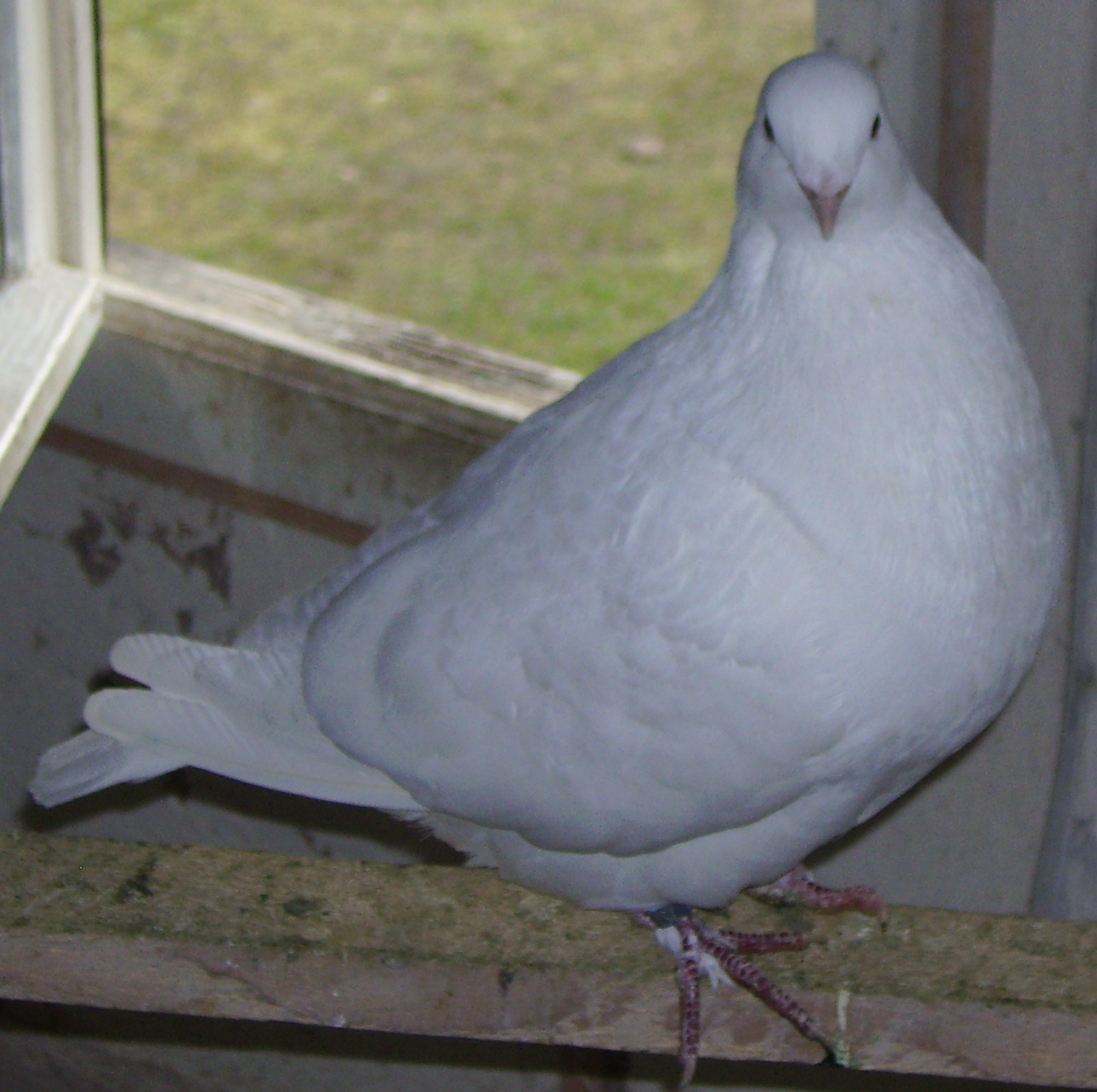
White Mittelhause
- Modena (GB/205)
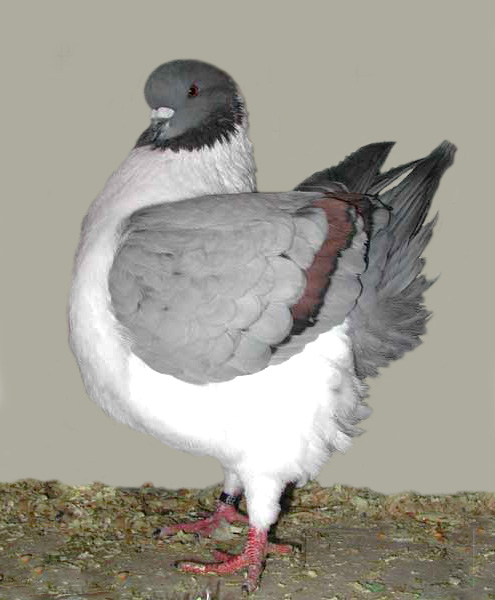
Modena (UK, Silver Gazzi)

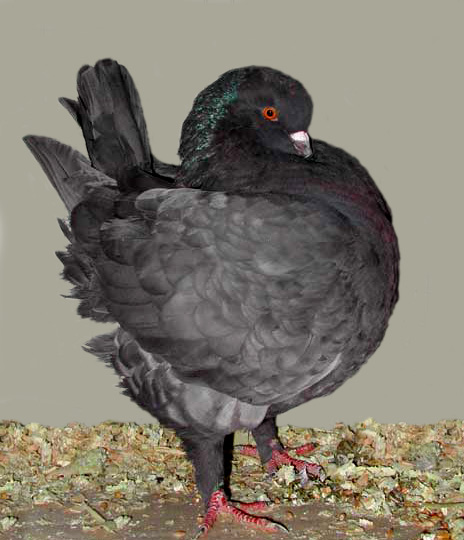
andalusian blue schietti

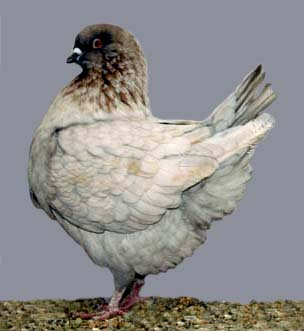
schietti reduced bronze
- Modern Show Flight
- Modern Spanish Thief Pouter
- Monor Tumbler (H/945)
- Montauban (F/003)
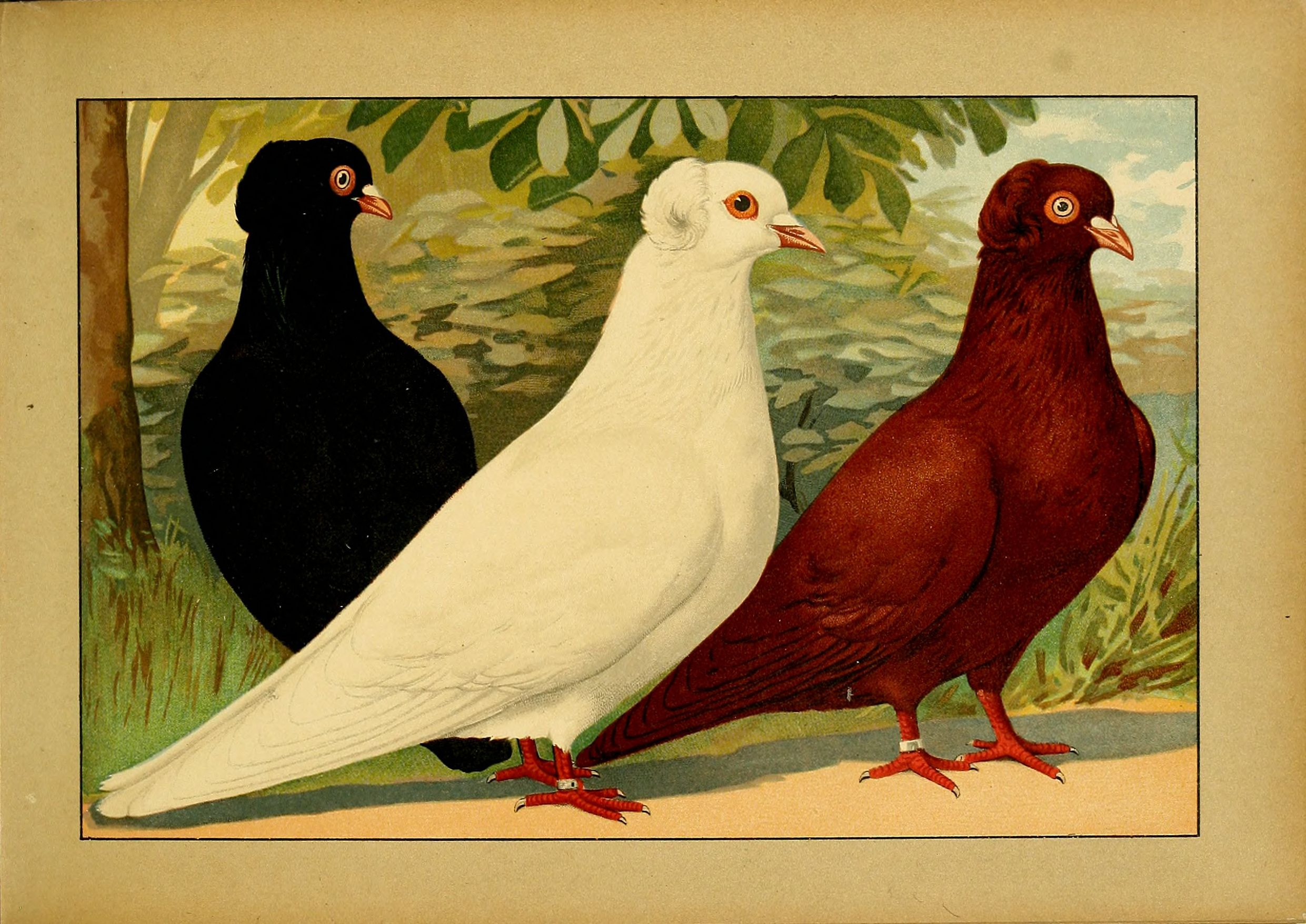
Montauban Schachtzabel 1906 Tafel 03
- Mookee (D/820)
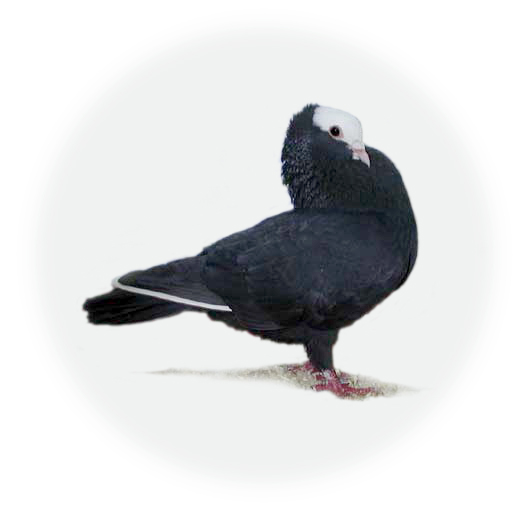
Black Mookee

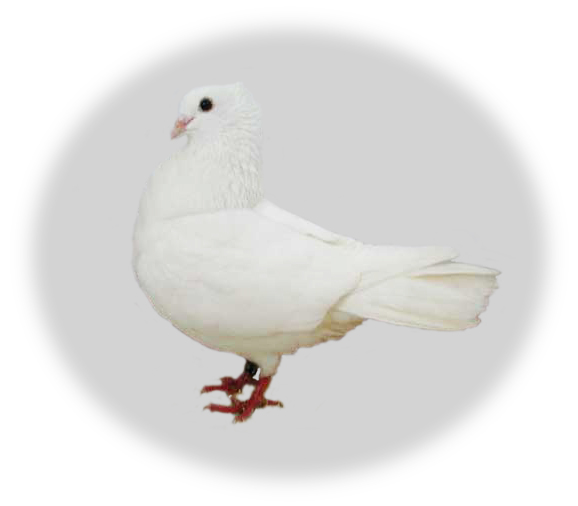
White Mookee
- Moravian Bagdad (CZ/111)
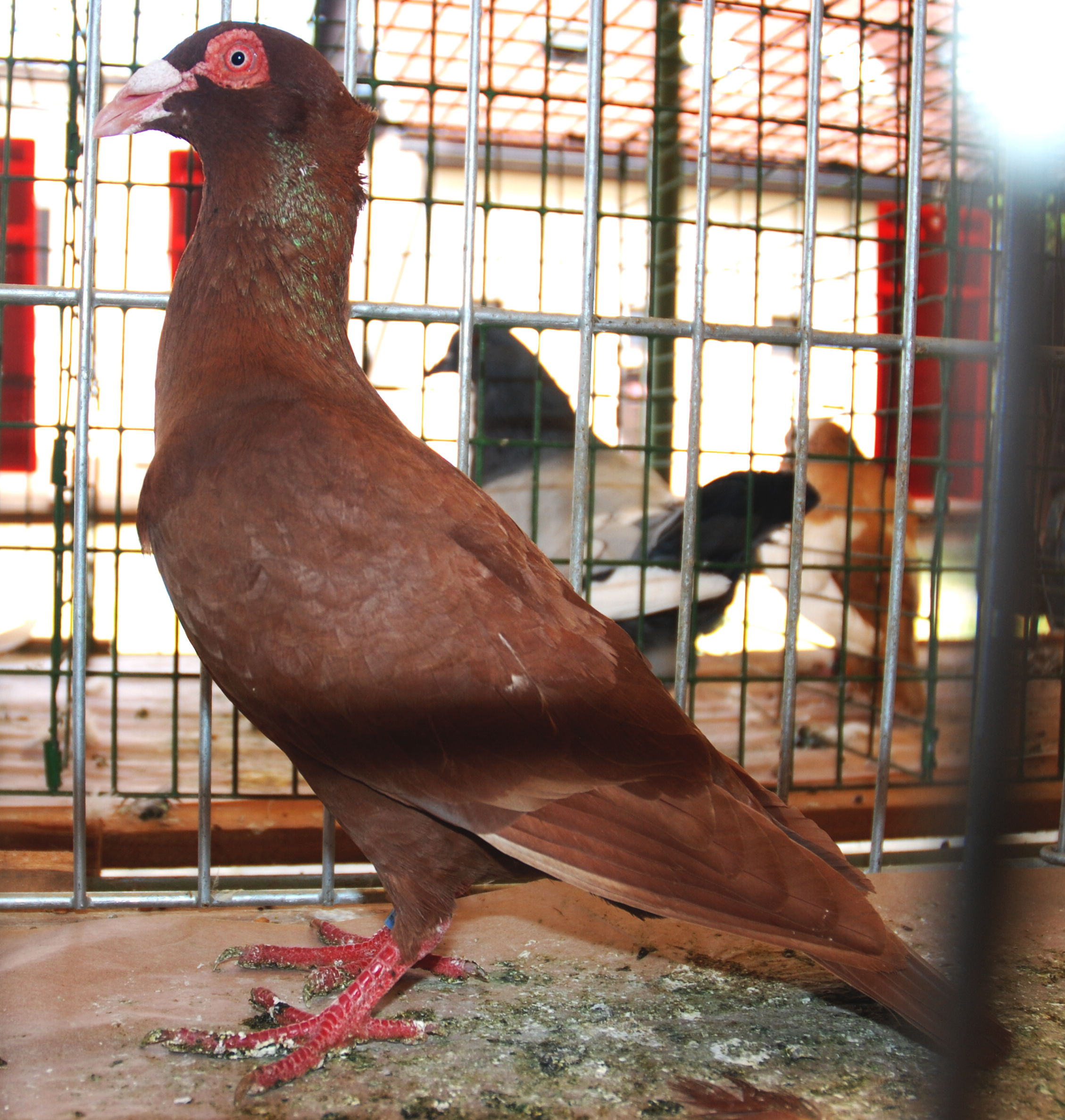
Red Moravian Bagdad

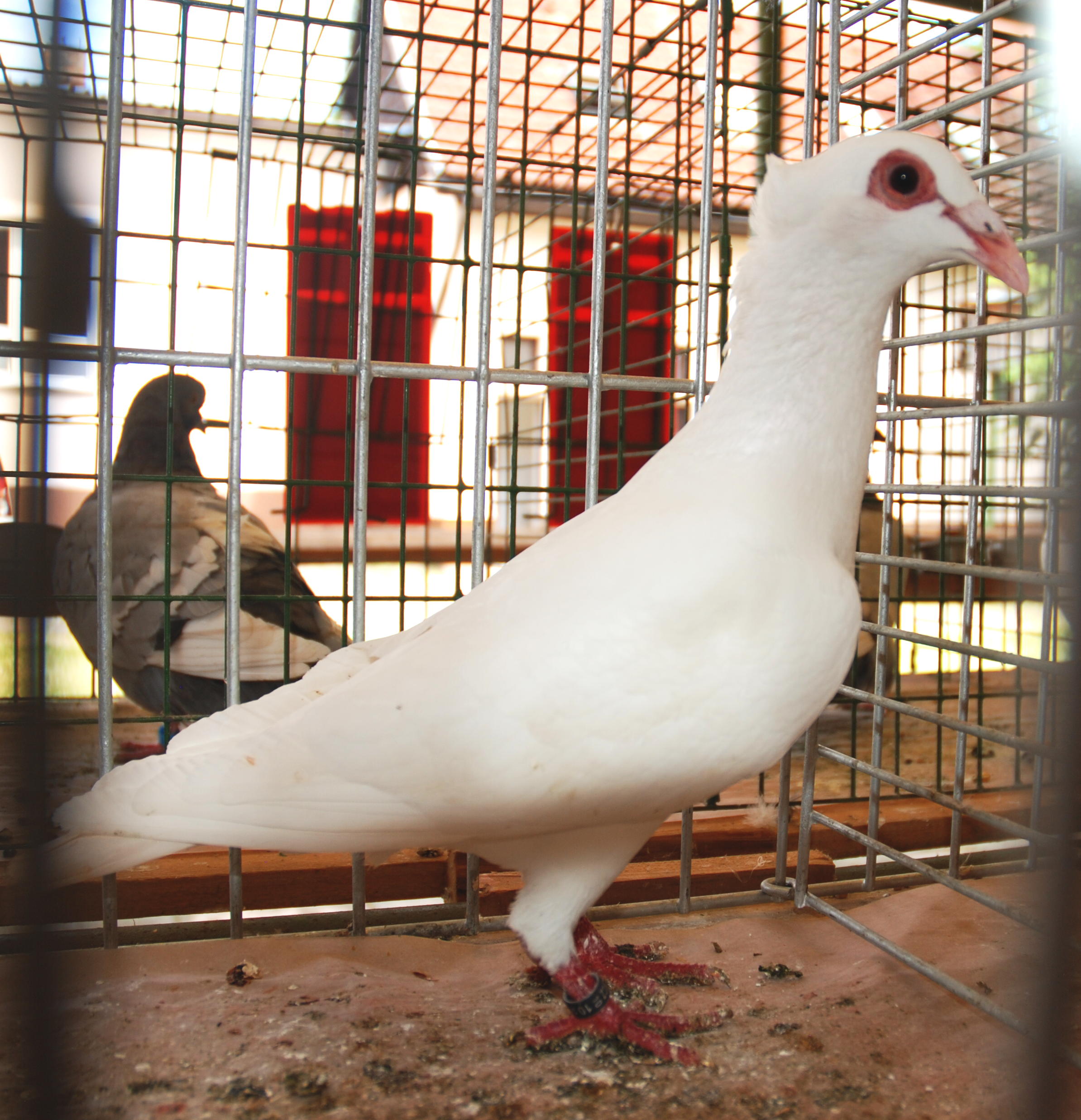
White Moravian Bagdad
- Moravian Magpie Cropper (CZ/311)
- Moravian Morak Cropper (CZ/312)
- Moravian Strasser (CZ/022)
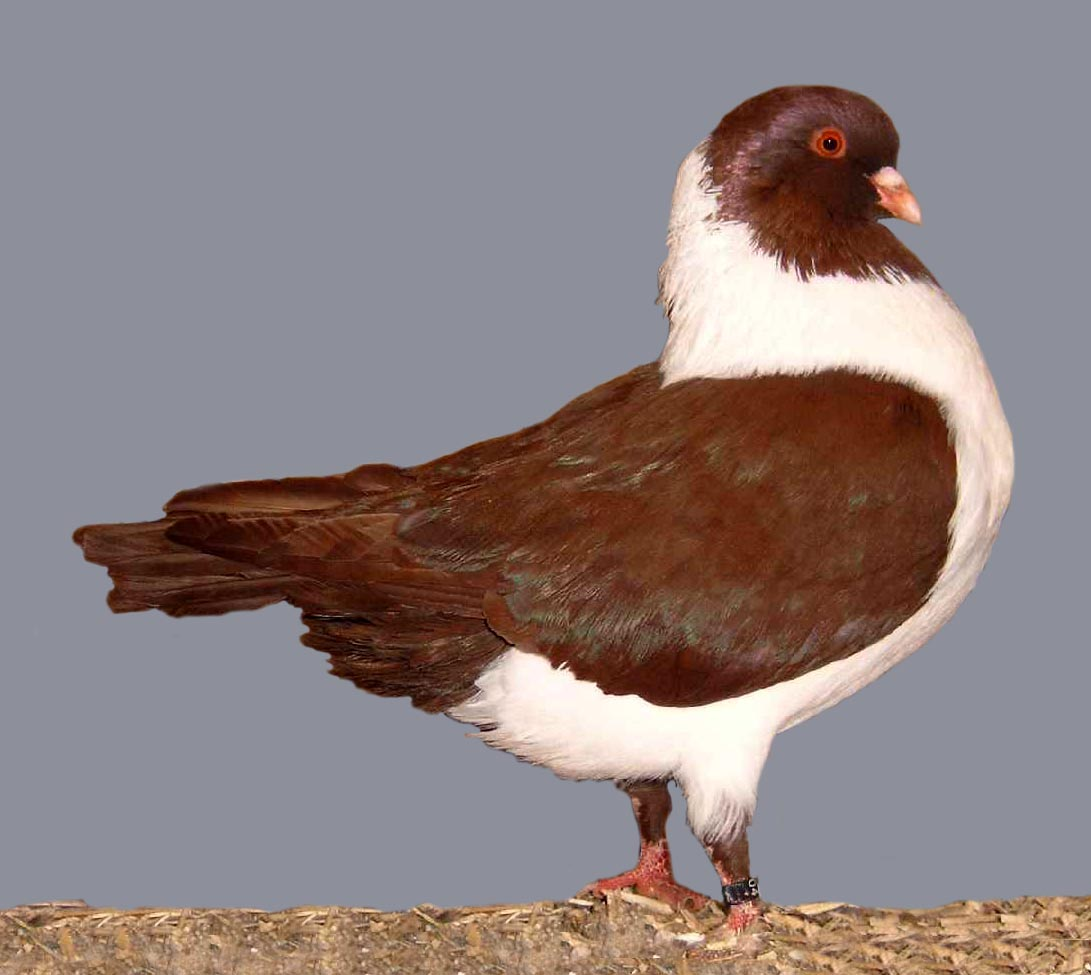
Red Moravian Strasser

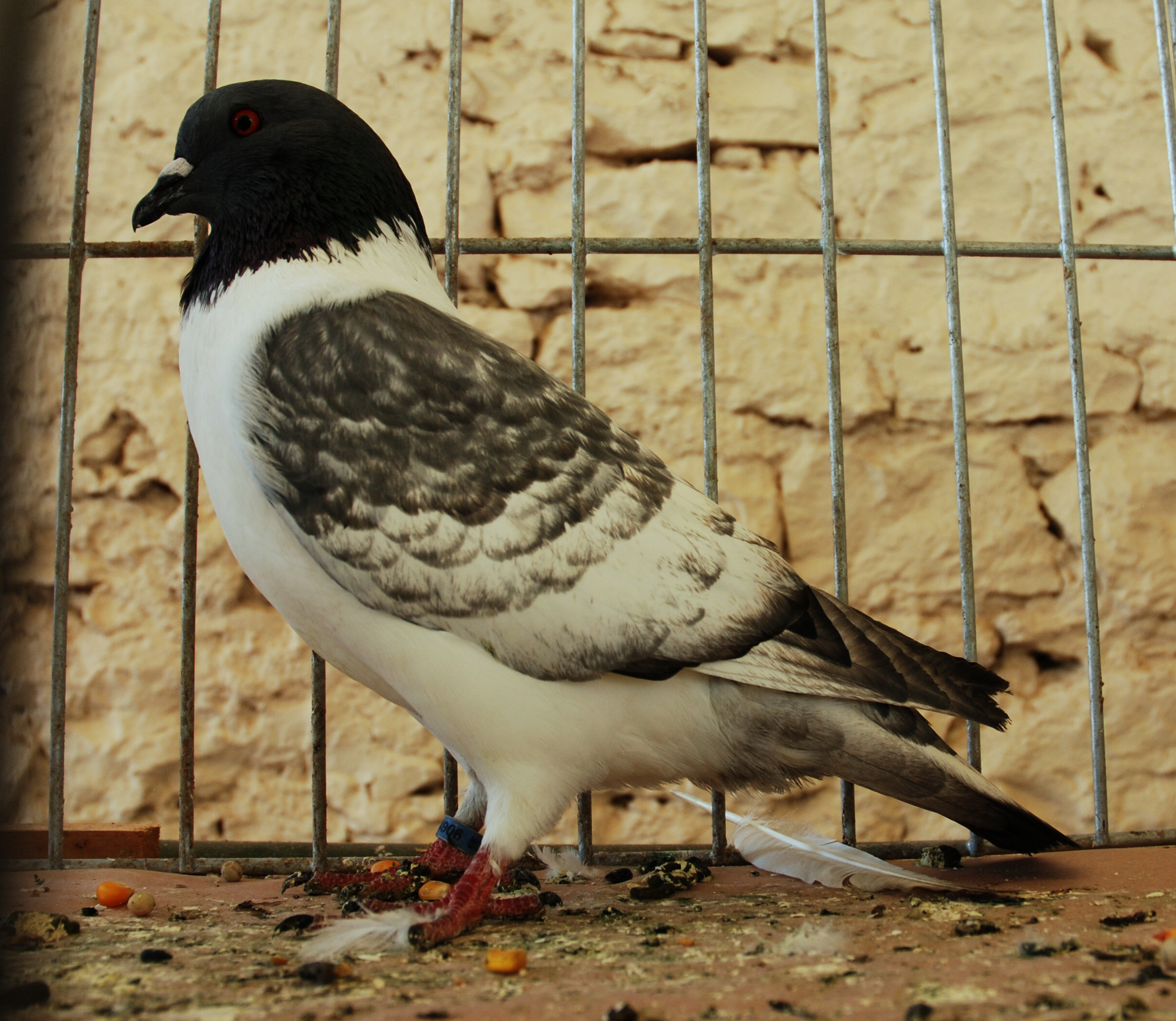
Moravian Strasser
- Moravian White-head
- Morillero Cropper (E/341)
- Morrillero Alicantino Pouter
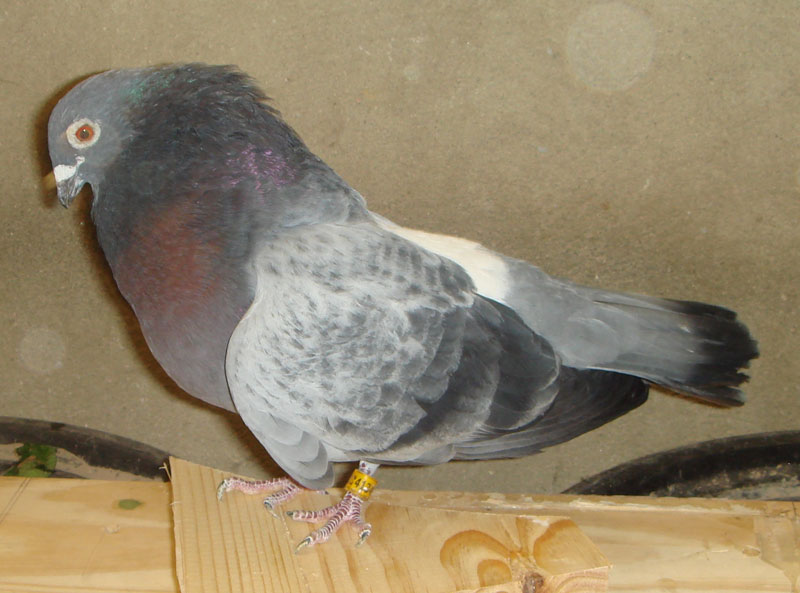
Morrillero Alicantino
- Moroncelo Cropper (E/342)
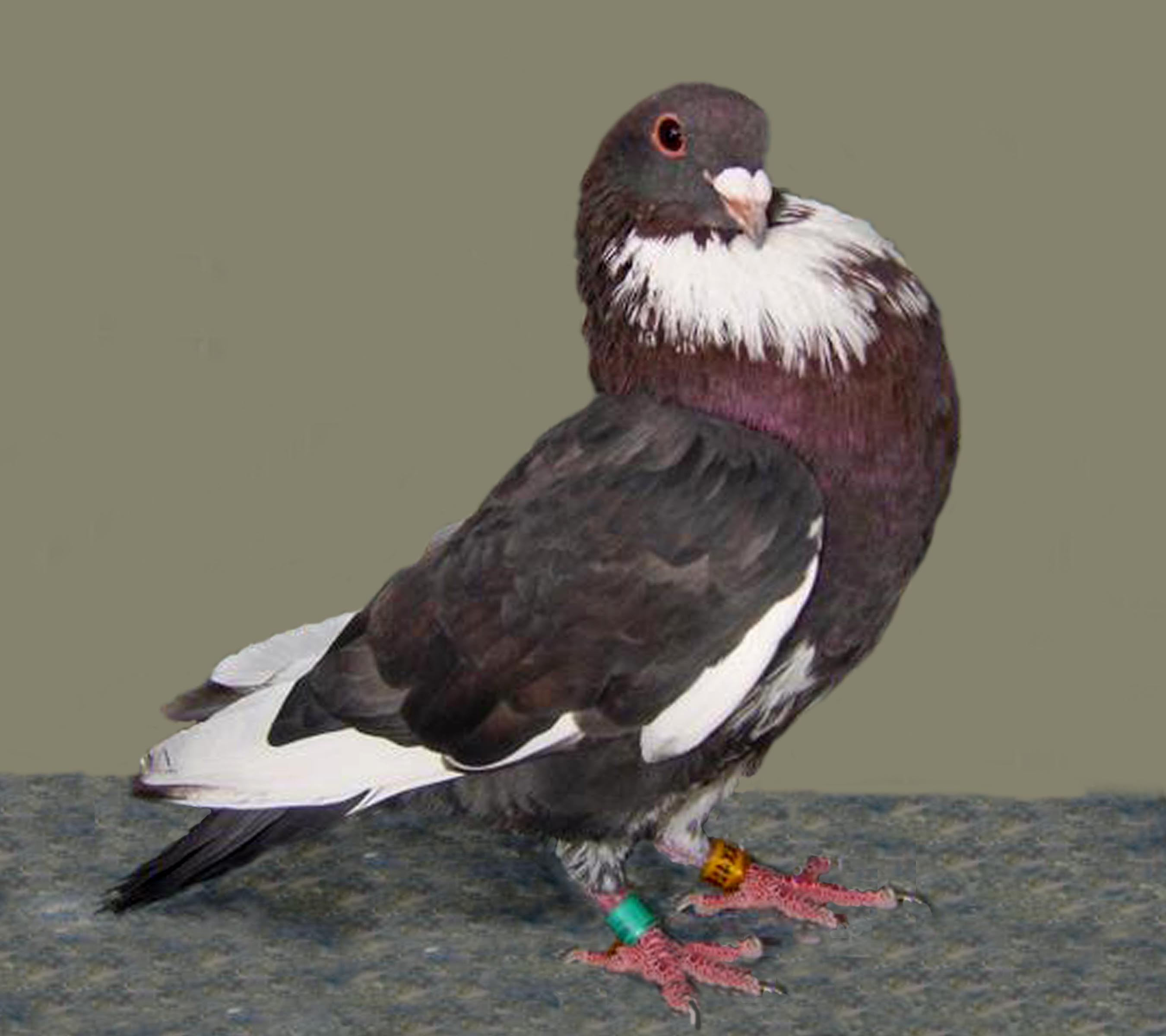
Moroncelo
- Moscat
- Moscovite Tumbler
- Moscow Black Magpie pigeon (RUS^{(D)}/985)
- Moulter
- Muffed Helmet (= Polish Helmet, = Polish Krymka Tumbler (PL/934))
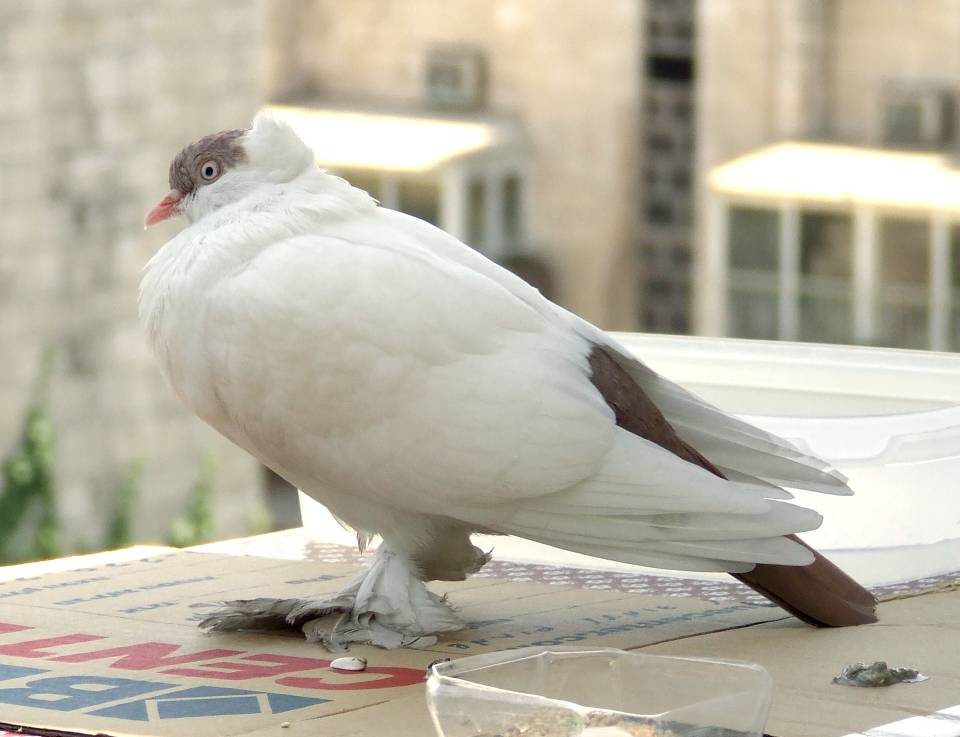
Muffed helmet Polish Krymka
- Mulhouse Pigeon (F/010)
- Munsterland Field Pigeon (D/407)
- Muntenia White-tail Tumbler (RO/977)

== N ==
- Naked-neck Tumbler (RO^{(D)}/853)
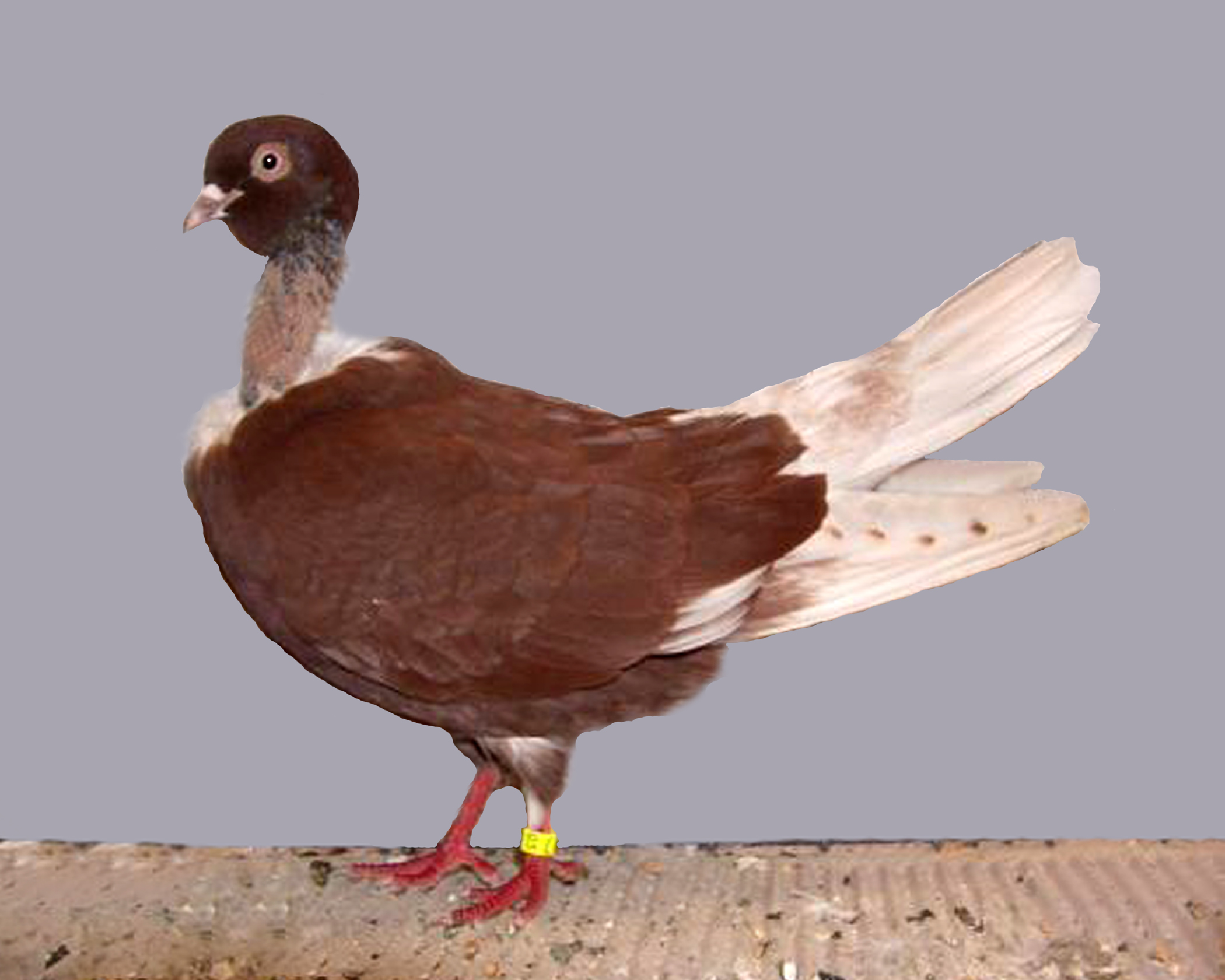
Red Rumanian Naked Neck
- New York Danish Flying Tumbler
- New York Flying Flight
- Nish Highflyer (SRB/887)
- Nord Caucasian Tumbler (RUS^{(D)}/872)
- Norwegian Tumbler (N/880)
- Norwich Cropper (GB/306)
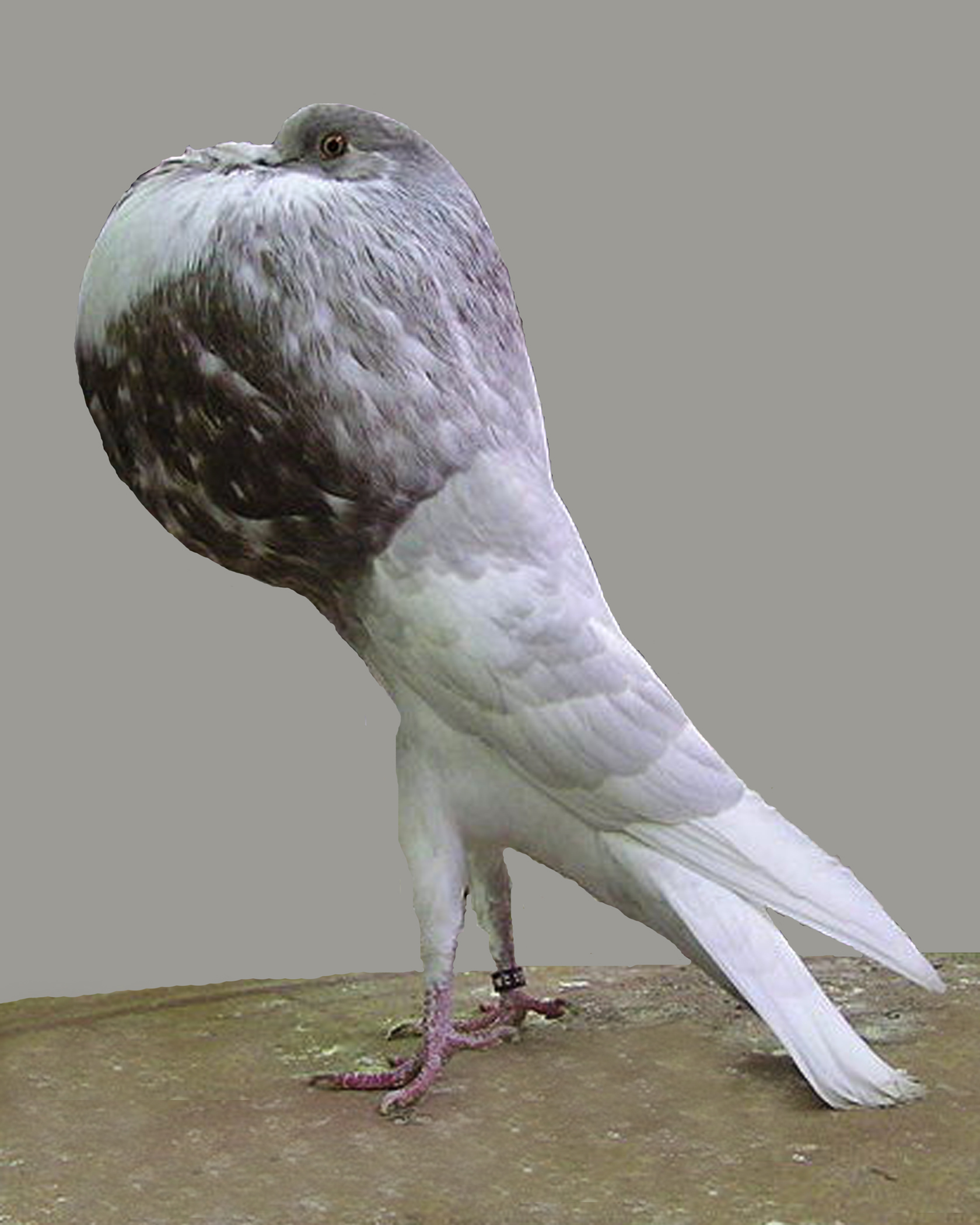
Barless Norwich Cropper

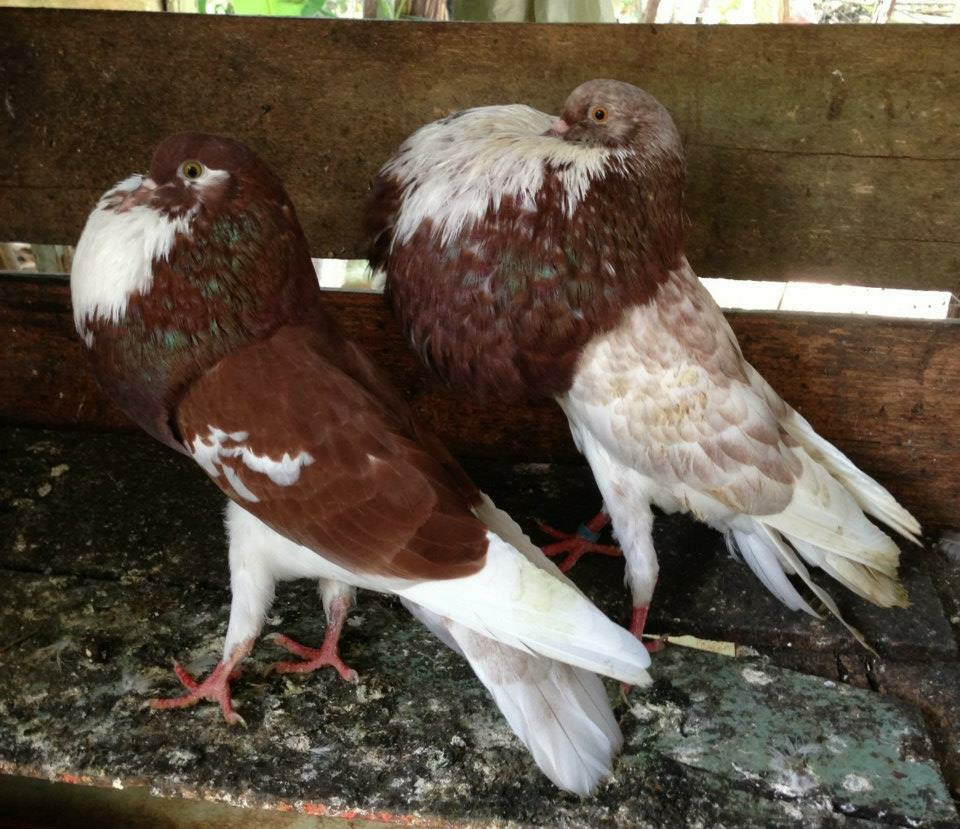
Norwich Cropper

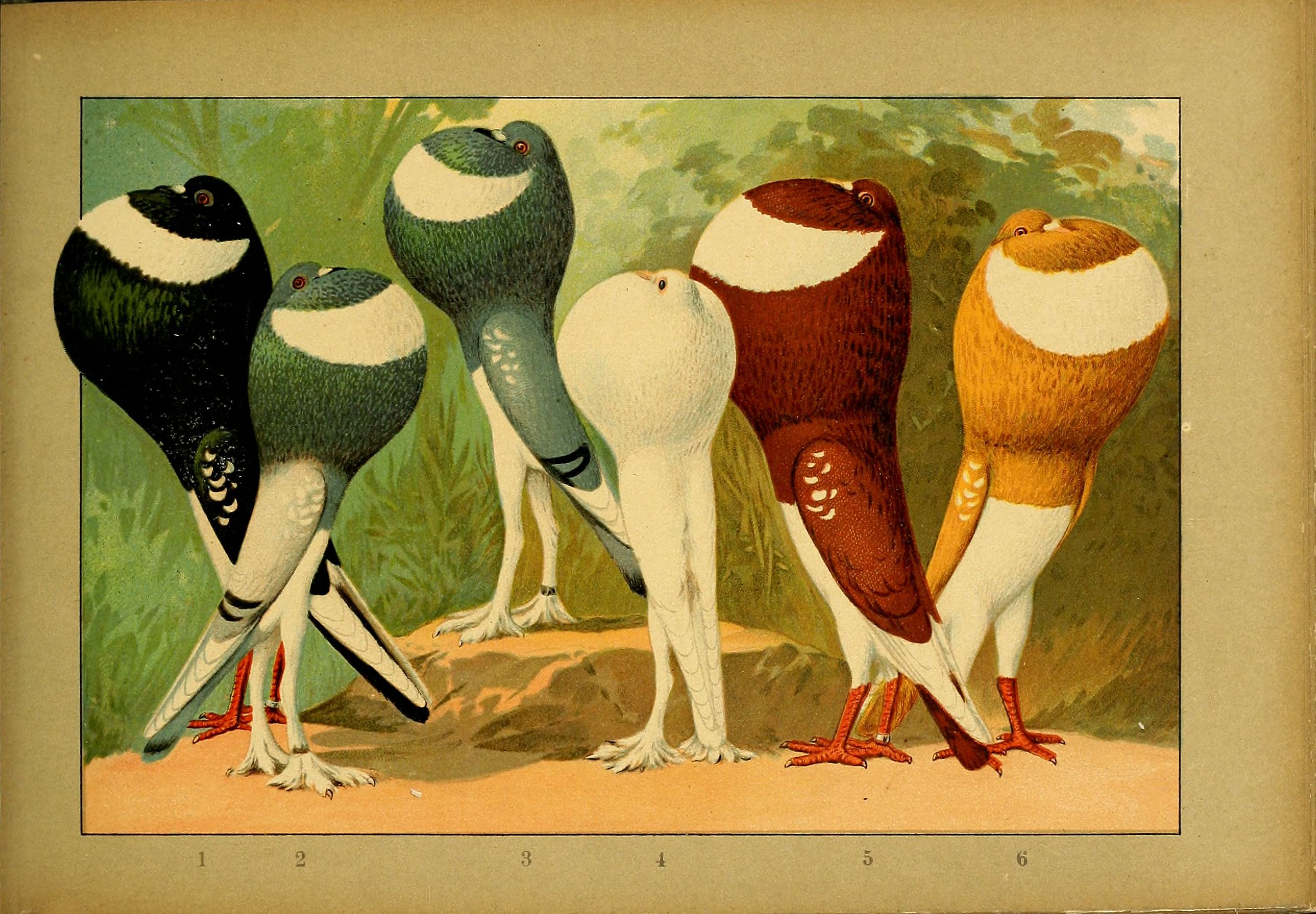
Schachtzabel 1906 Tafel 63
- Novisad Short-faced Tumbler (SRB/889)
- Nun (GB/896) (= English Nun)
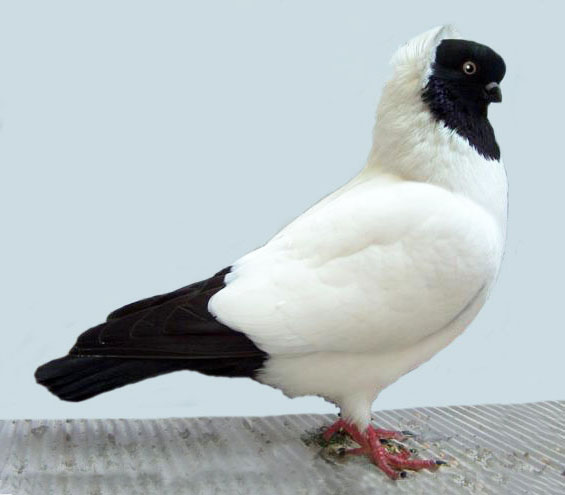
Black capped Nun

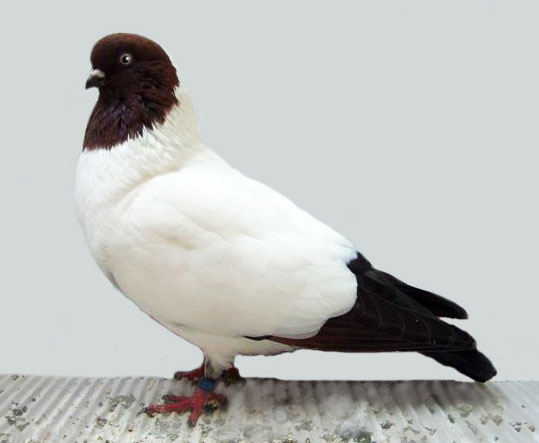
Black plain head Nun

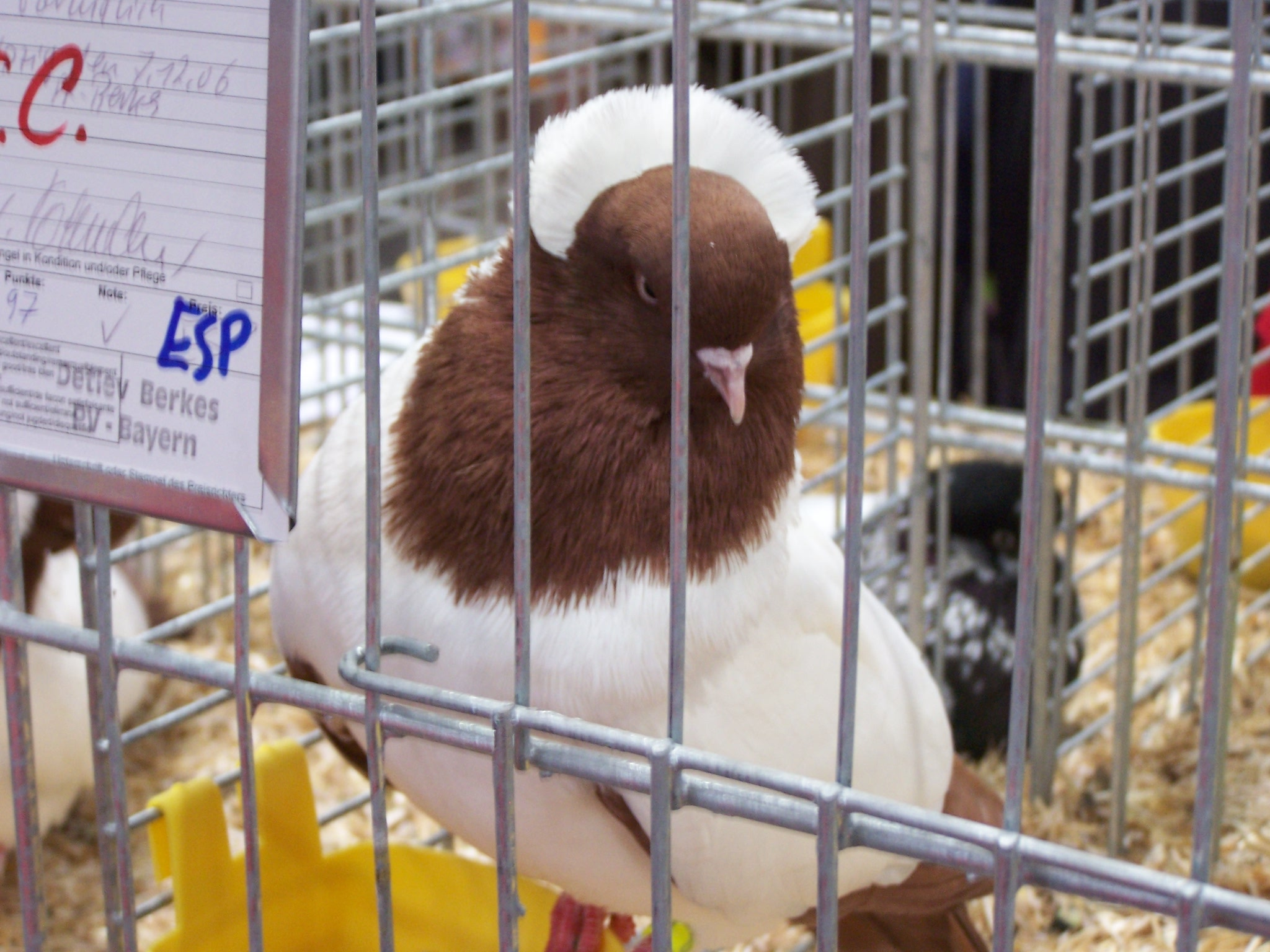
Red capped Nonduif
- Nuremberg Lark pigeon (D/448)
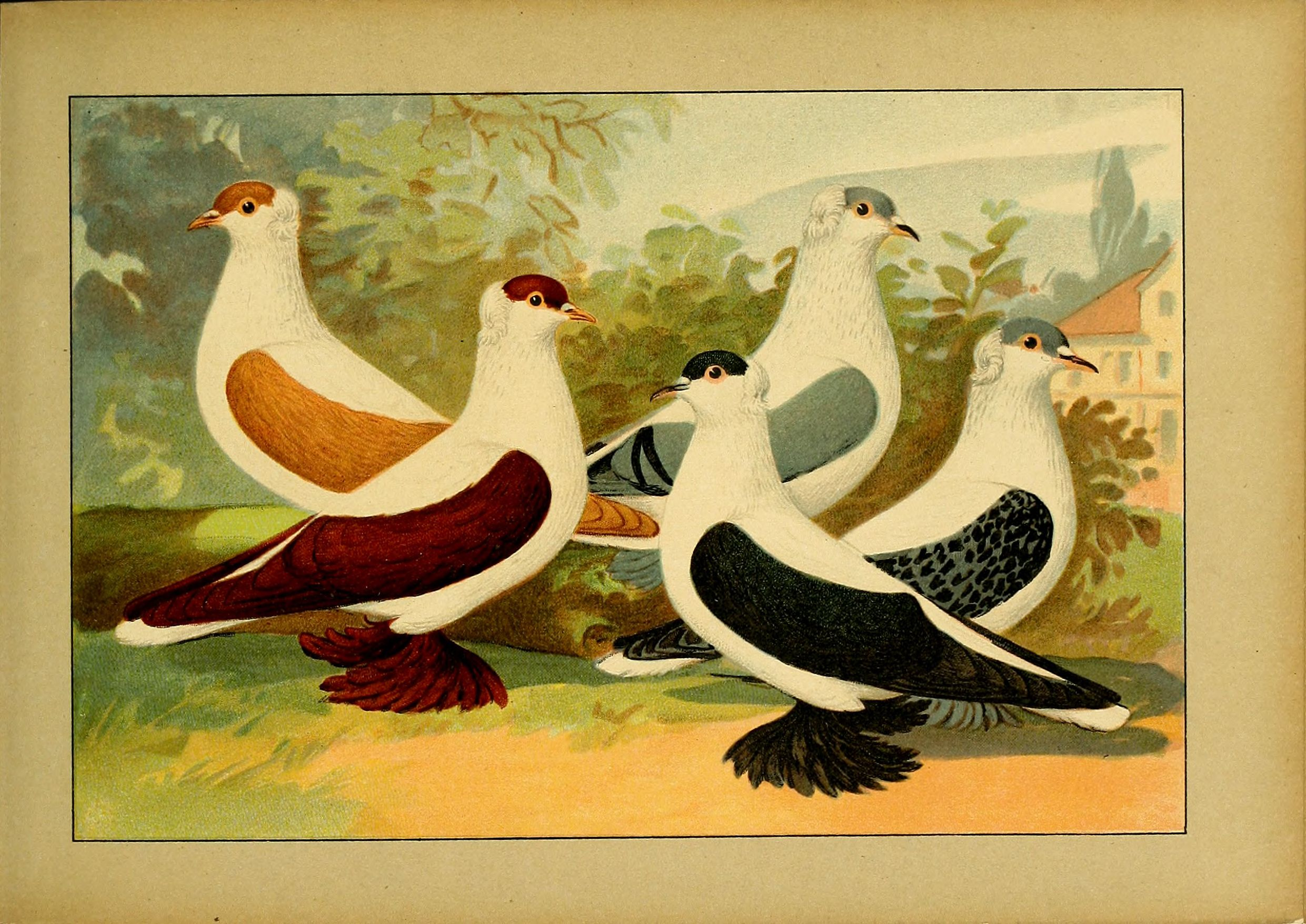
Nuremberg Swallow Schachtzabel 1906 Tafel 36
- Nuremberg Swallow pigeon (D/447)
- Nis Highflyer
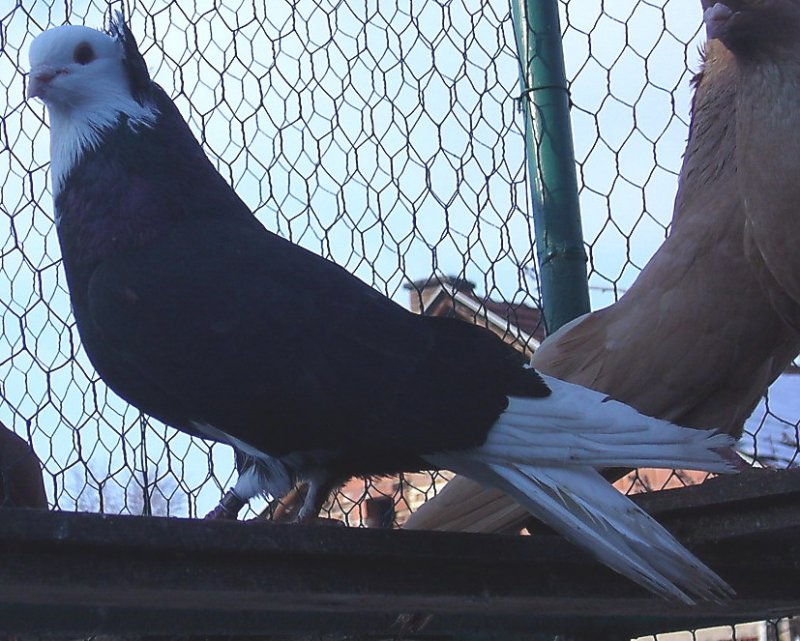
Nis Highflyer

== O ==
- Old Austrian Tumbler (A/834)
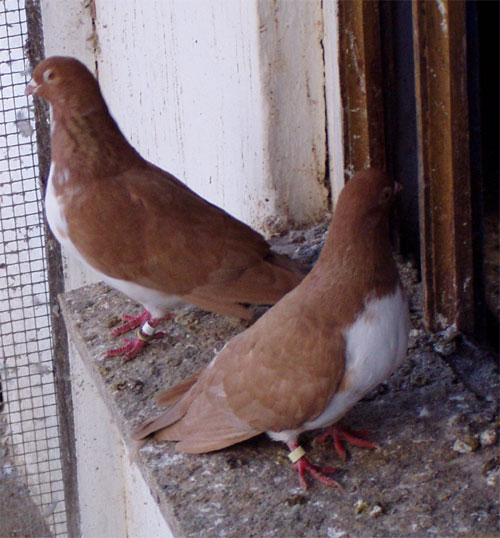
Altösterreichische Tümmler
- Old Dutch Capuchine (NL/603)
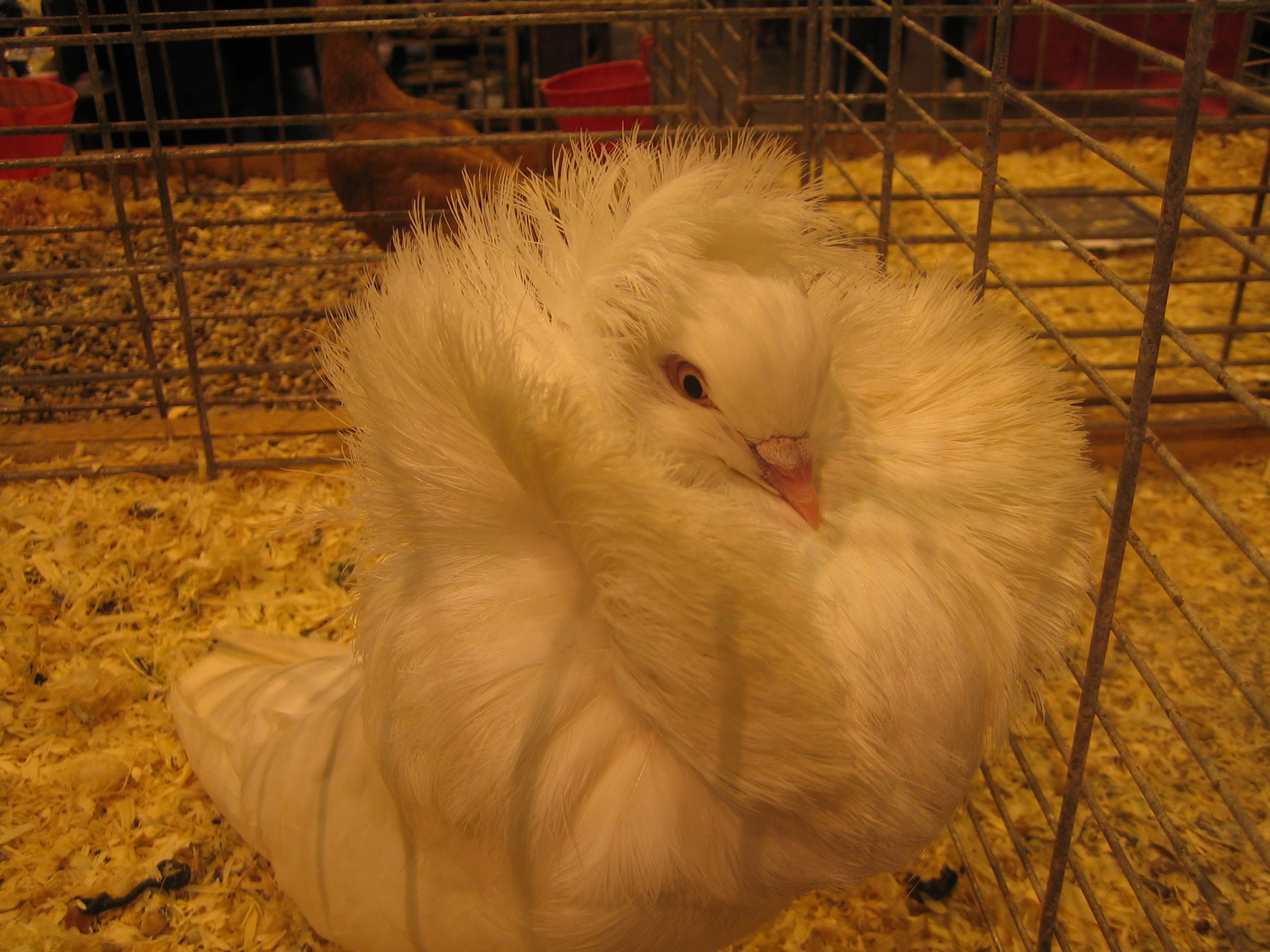
White Old Dutch Capuchine

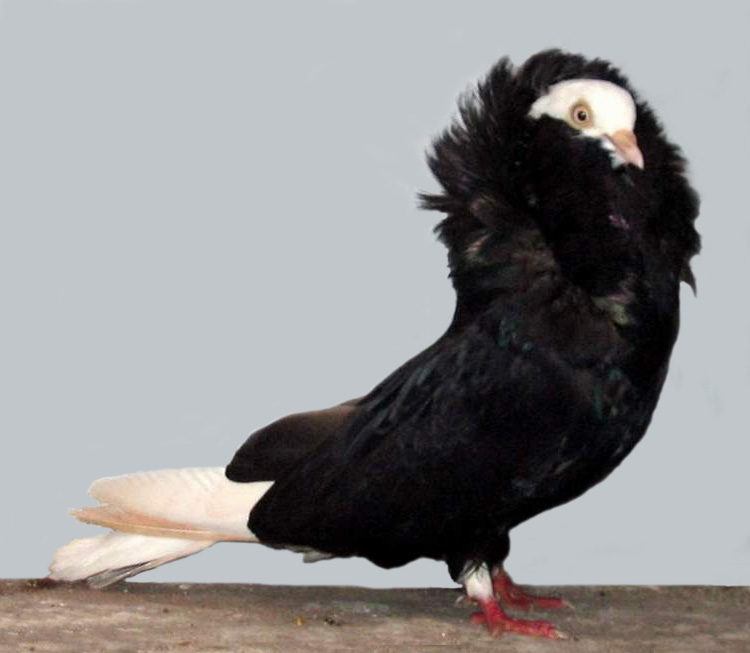
Black Old Dutch Capuchine
- Old Dutch Tumbler (NL/826)
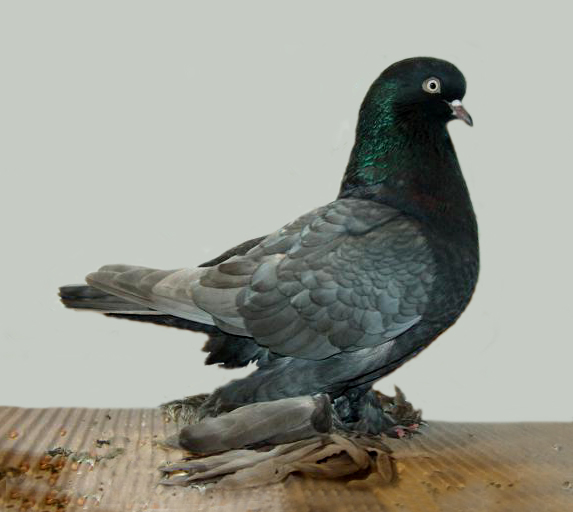
Andalusian

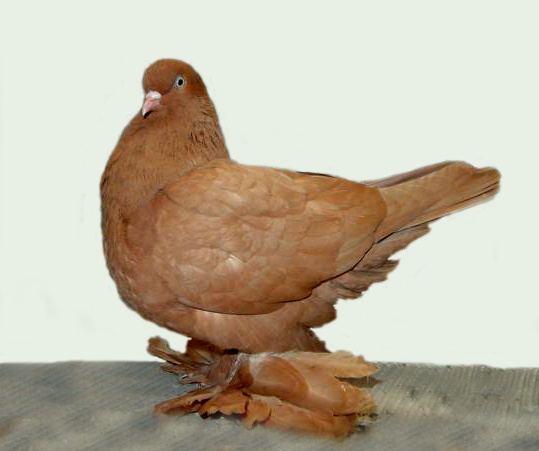
Yellow
- Old Dutch Turbit (NL/703)
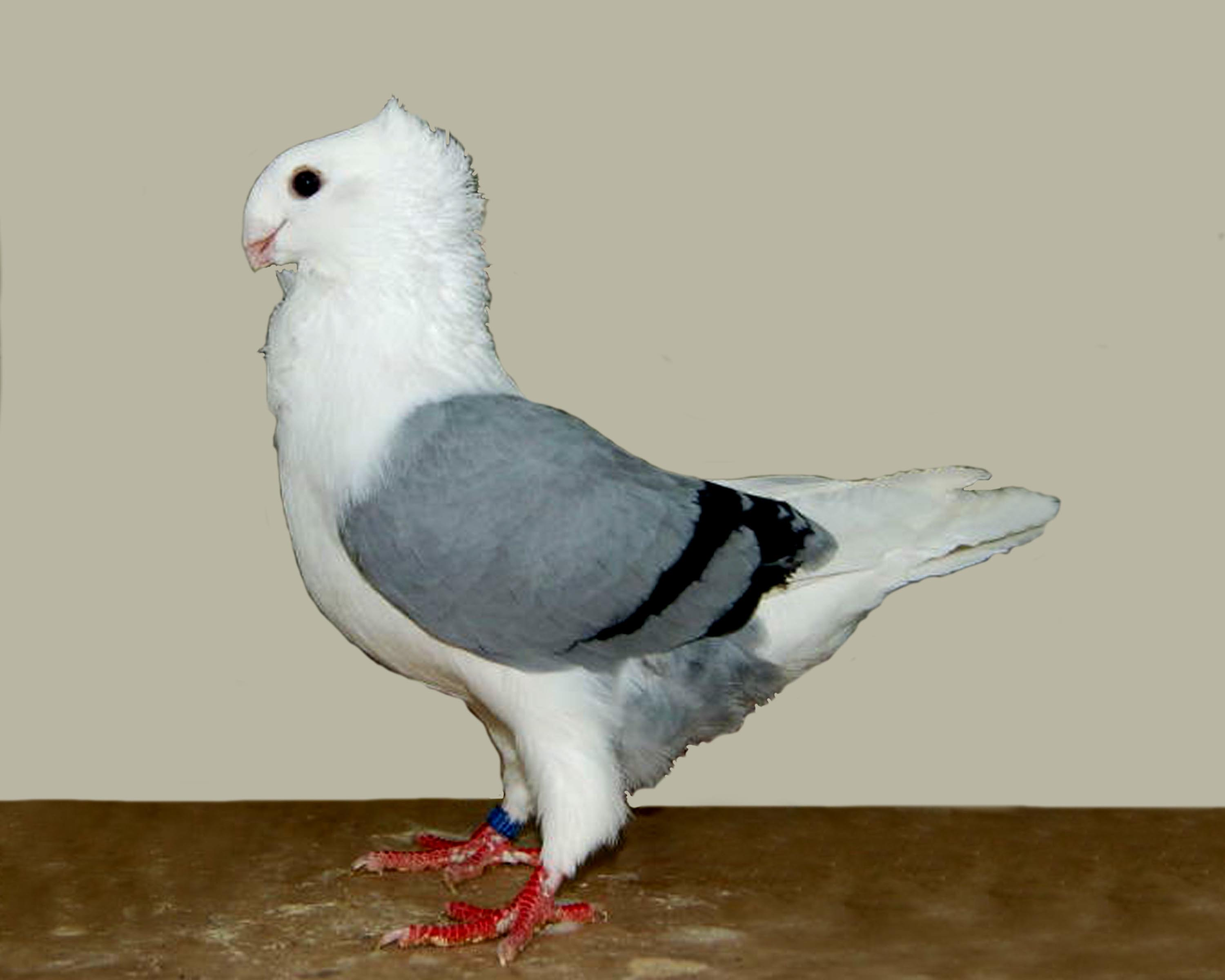
Old Dutch Turbit
- Old Fashioned Oriental Frill (= Old Oriental Owl pigeon (D^{(USA)}/726))
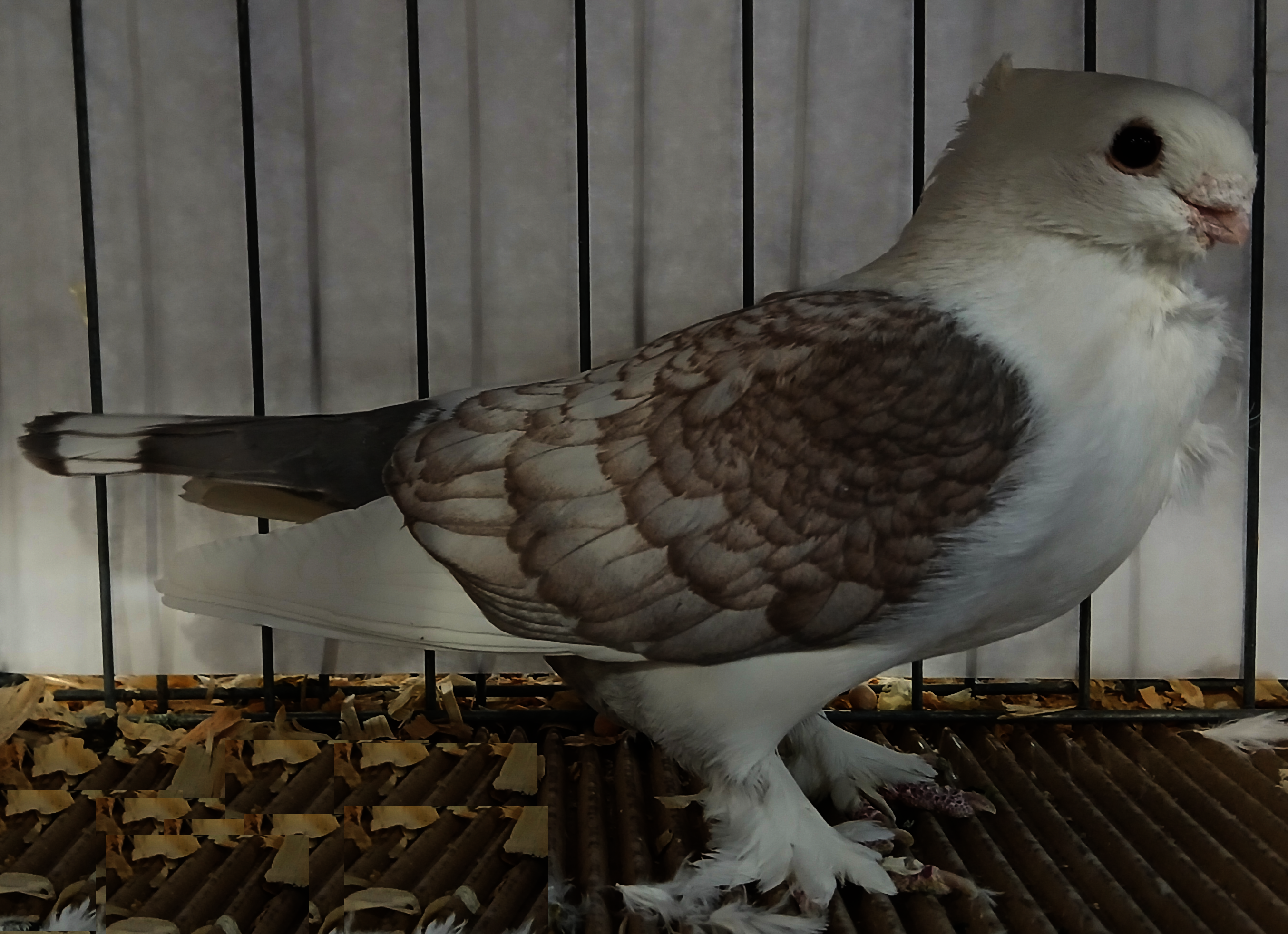
Spot tail

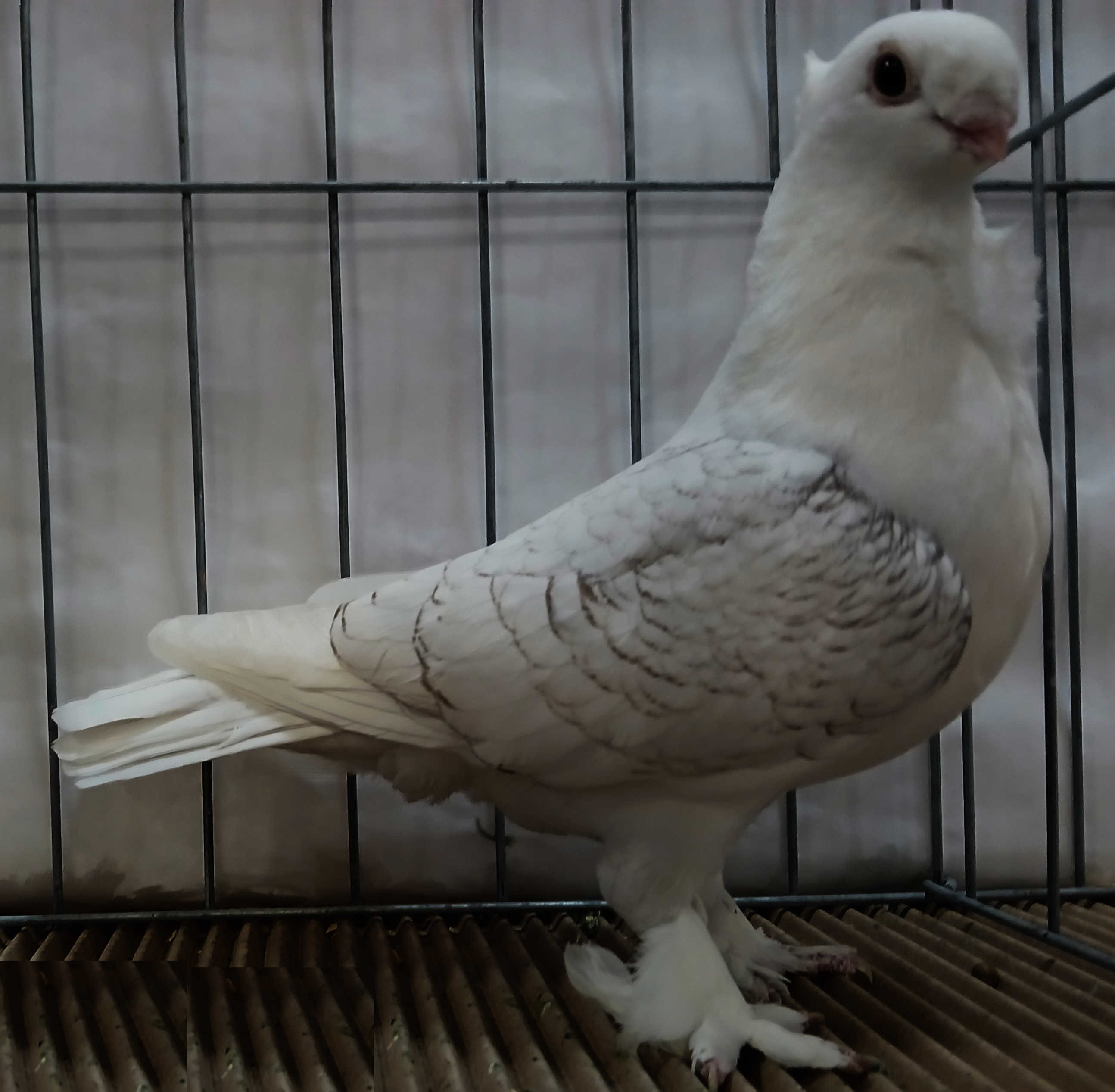
Satinete
- Old German Cropper (D/301)
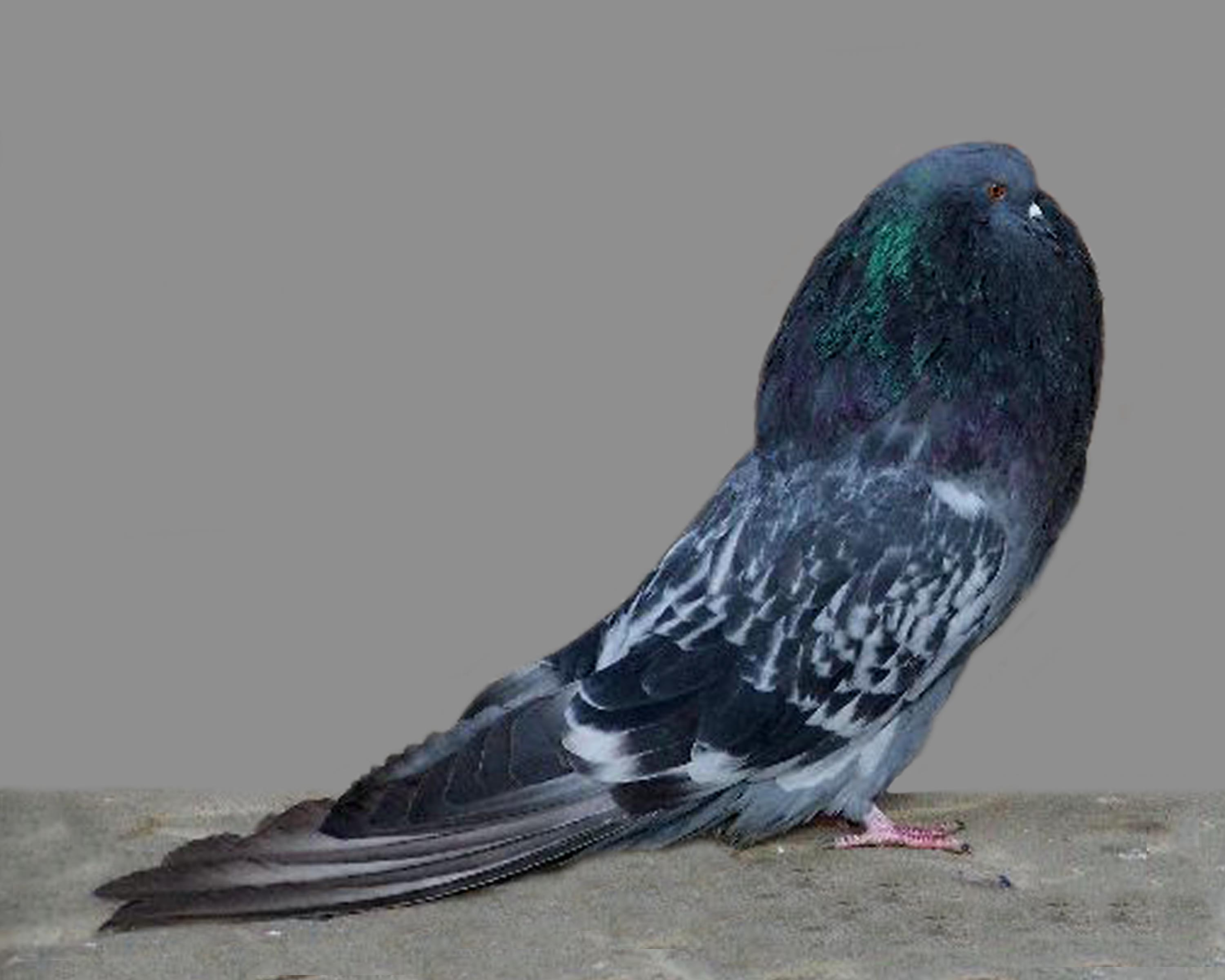
Old German Cropper
- Old German Magpie Tumbler (D/828)
- Old German Moor-head (D/479)
- Old German Nun
- Old German Owl pigeon (D/704)
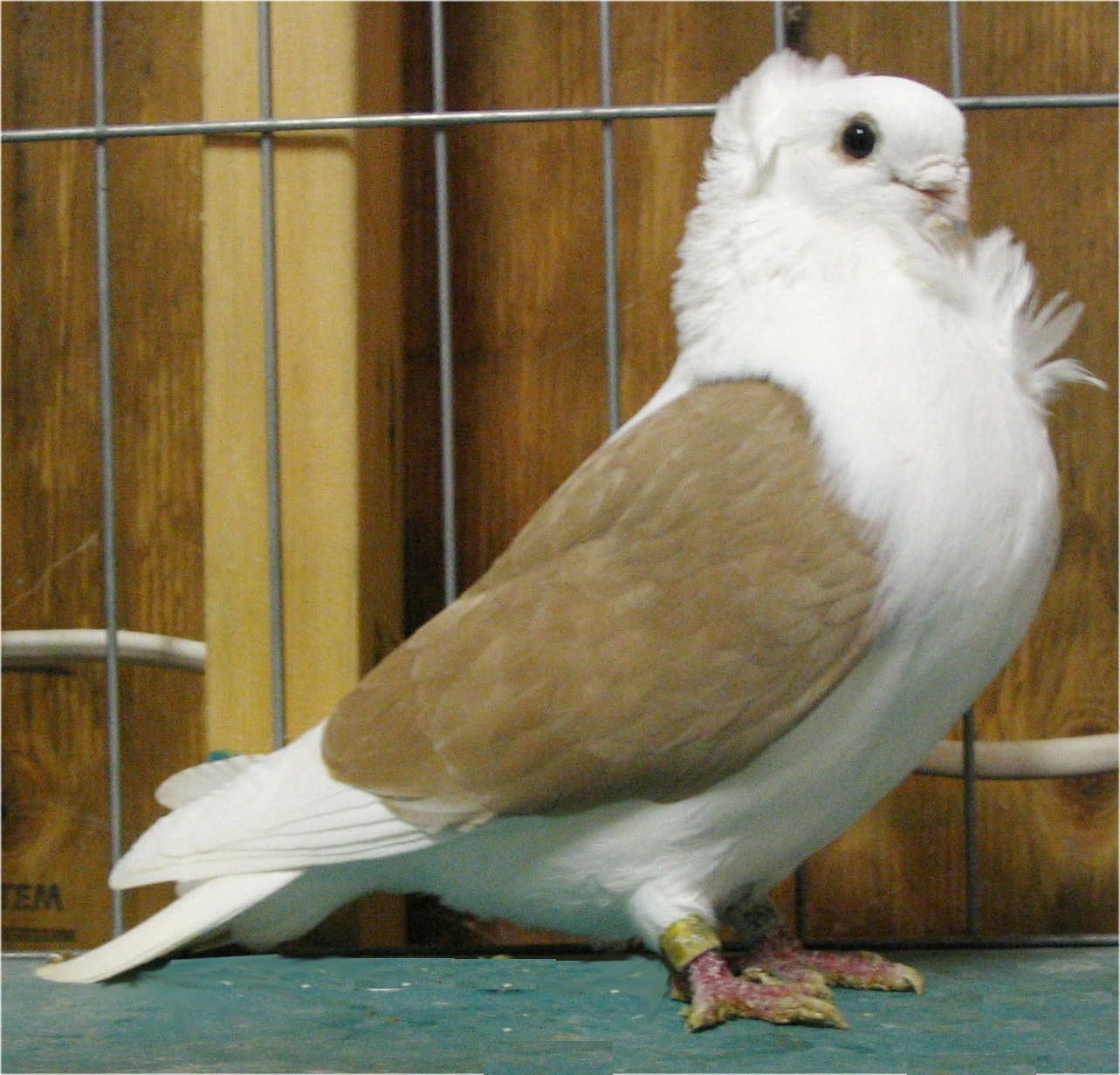
Yellow Old German Owl

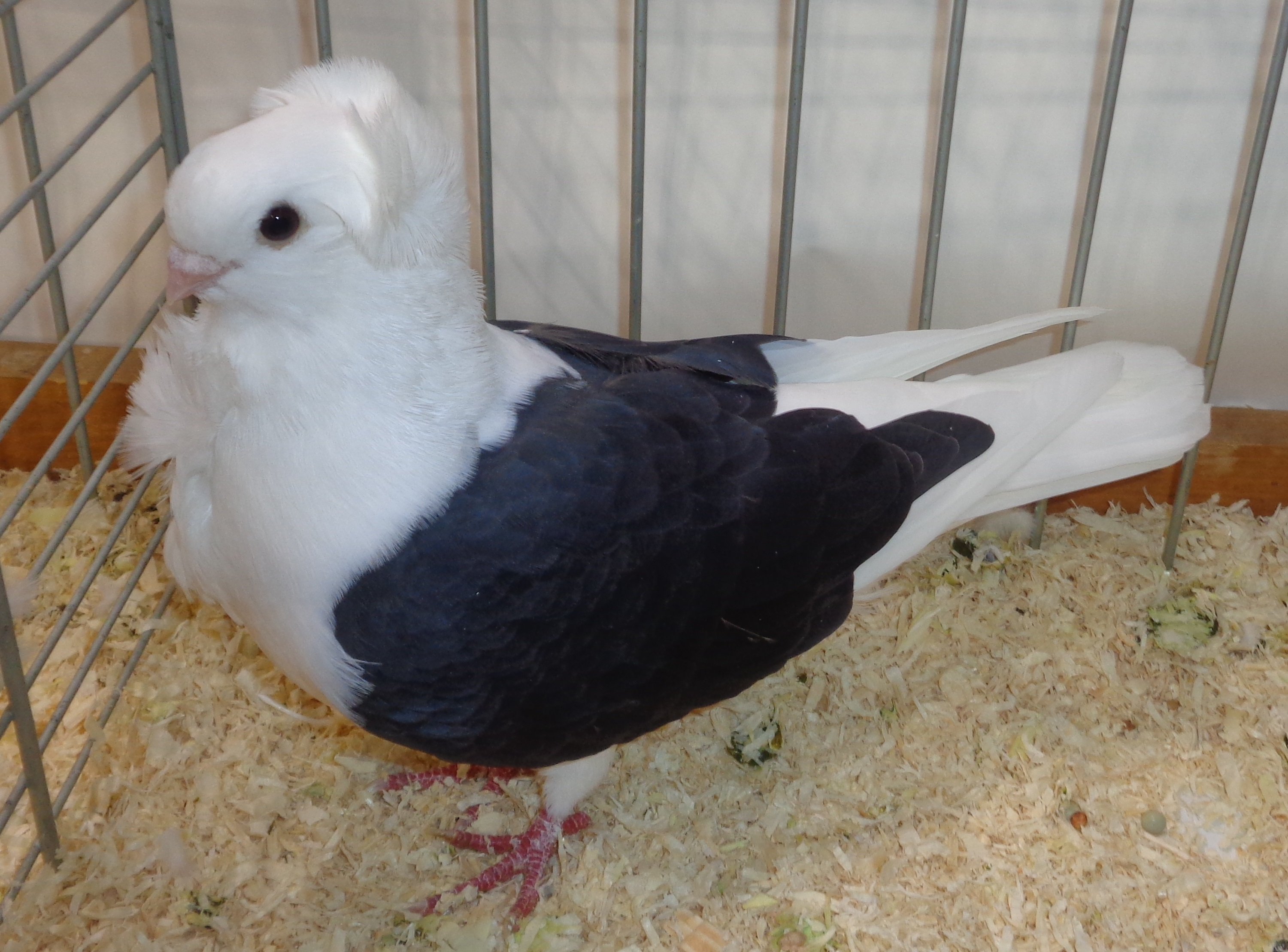
Black Old German Owl

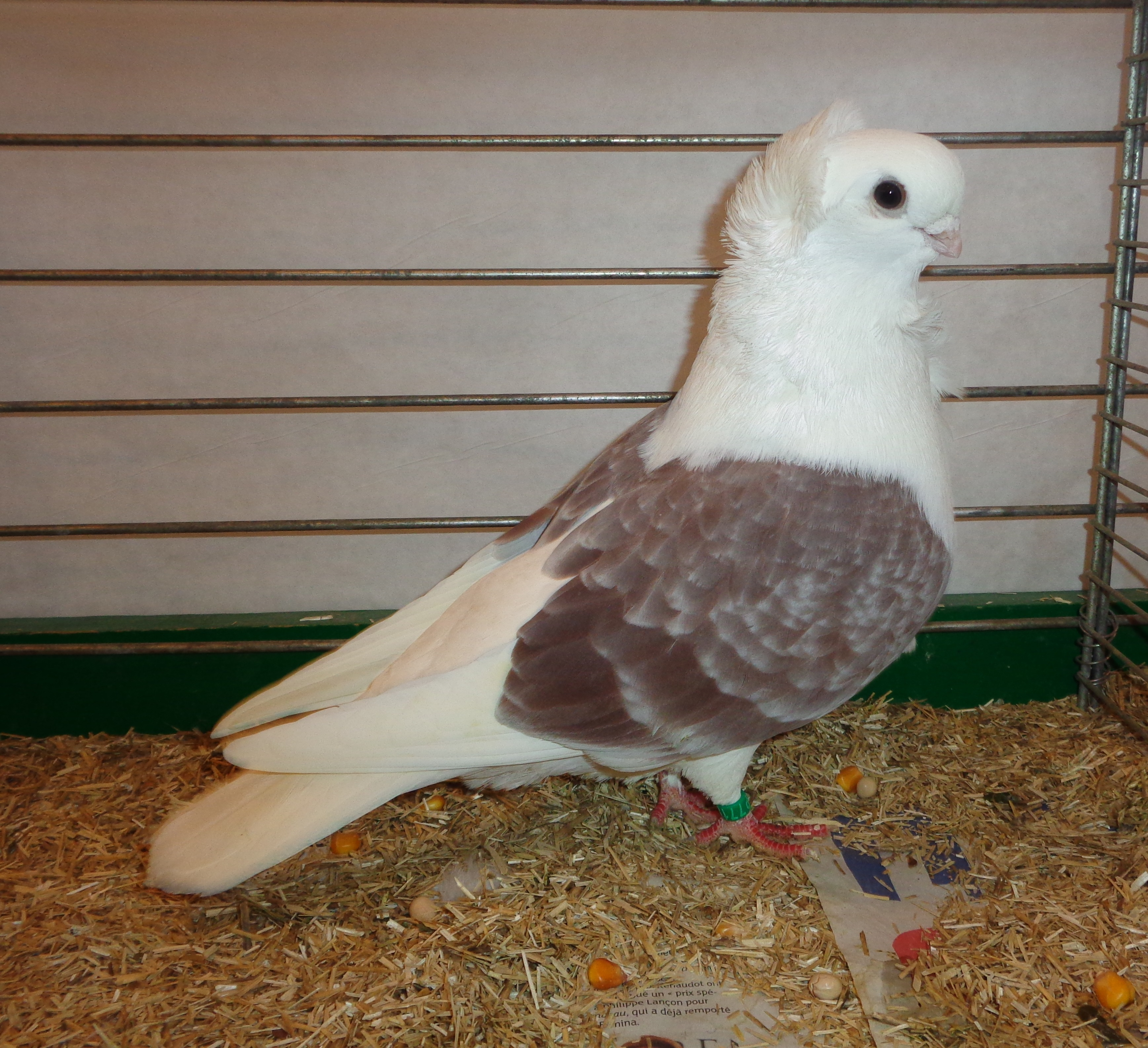
Red Check Old German Owl

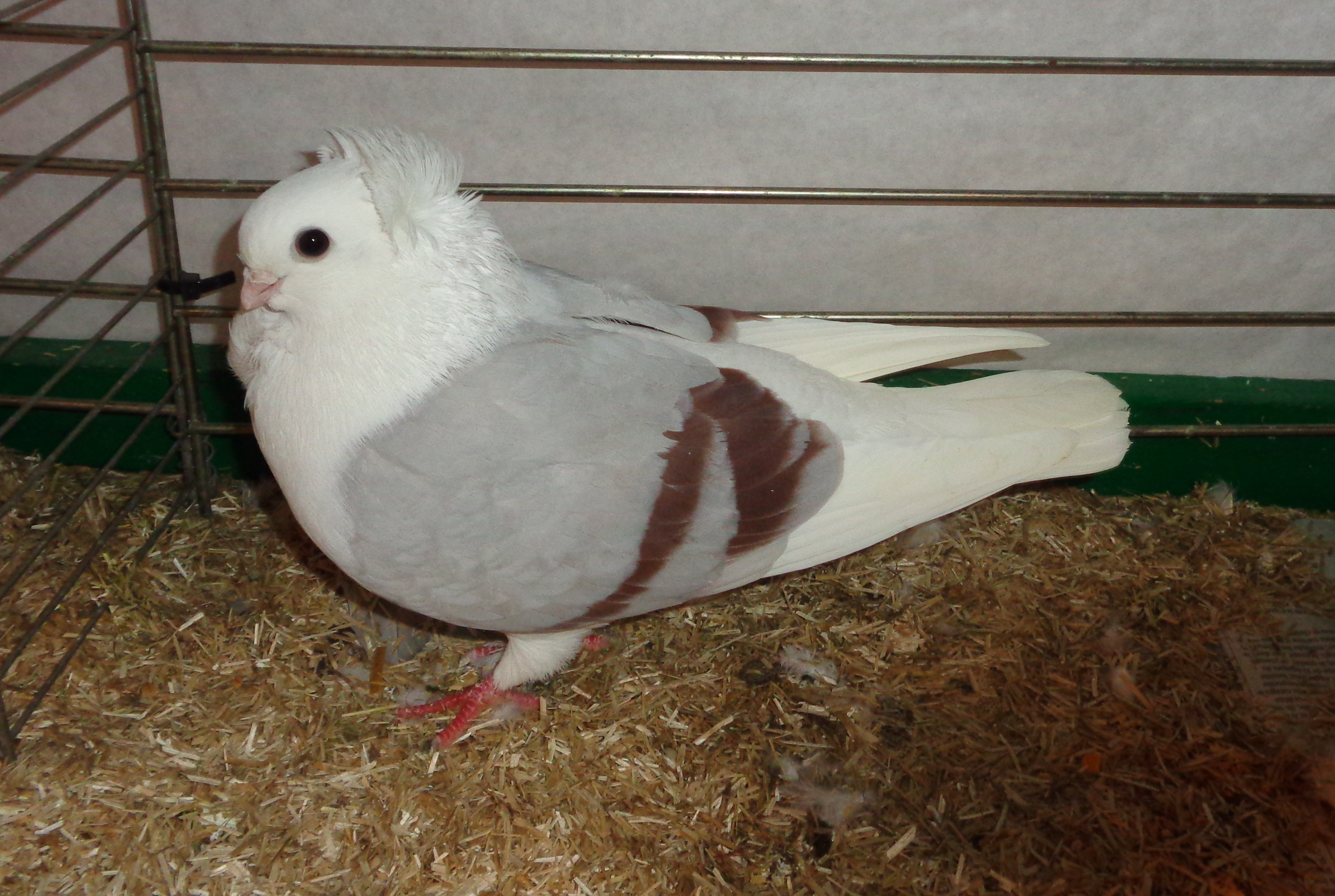
Red Bar Old German Owl
- Old German Turbit
- Old Holland Pouter
- Old Oriental Owl pigeon (D^{(USA)}/726) (= Old Fashioned Oriental Frill)
- Old Style English Flying Saddle Tumbler
- Old Vienna Highflyer (A/982)
- Orbetean Romanian Rust-coloured Highflyer (RO/1004)
- Oriental Frill (GB/714)
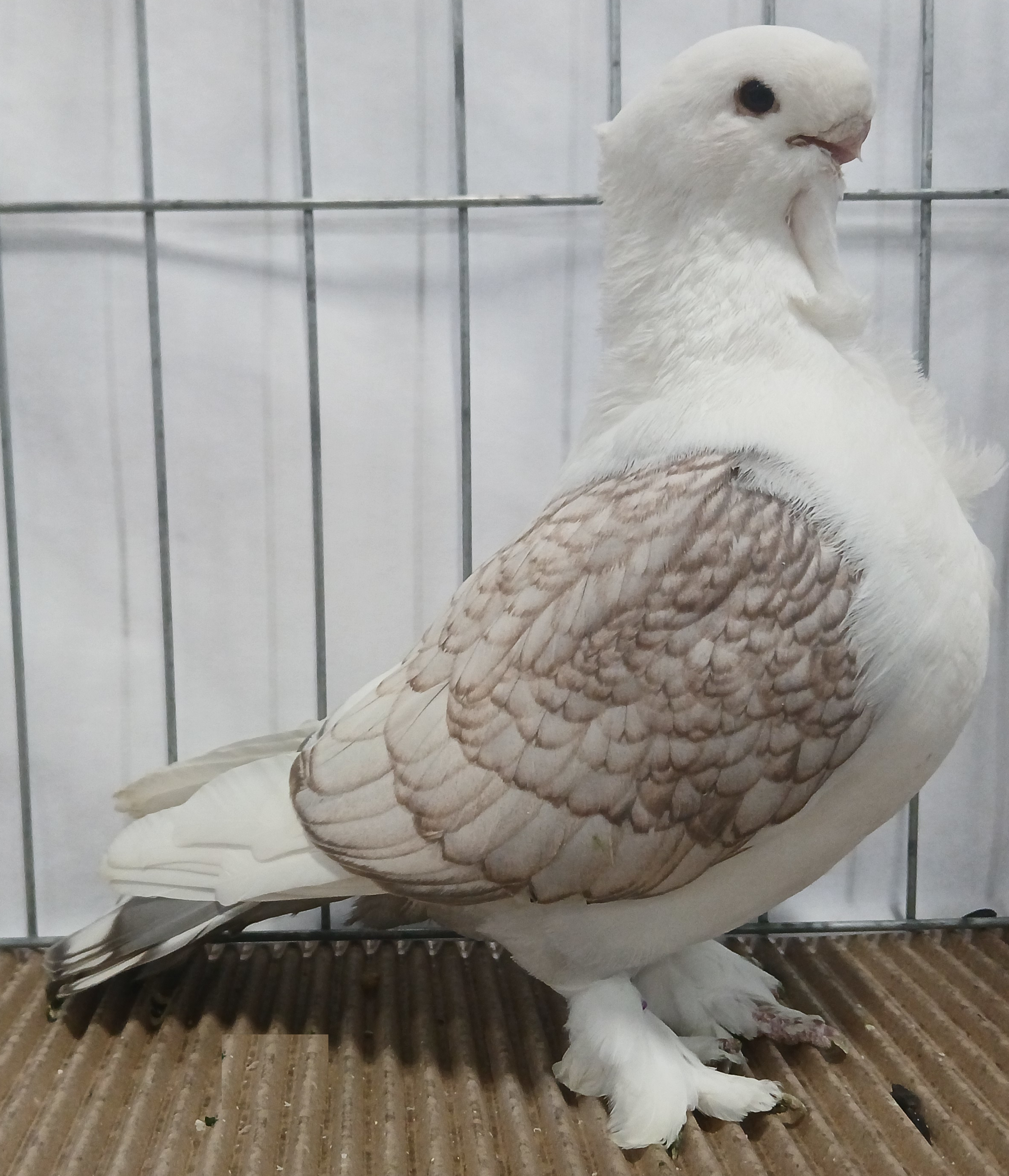
Oriental Frill

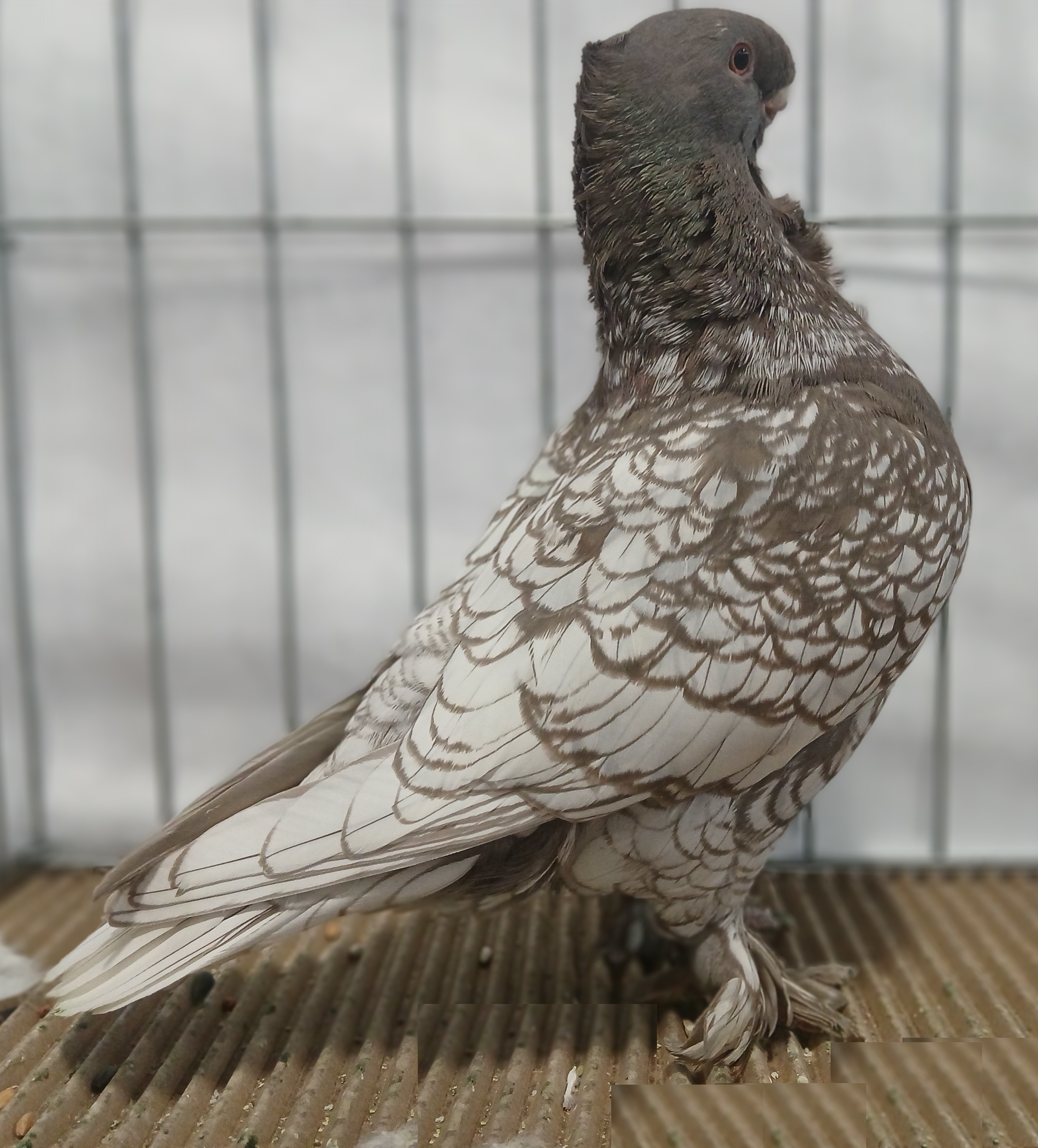
Oriental Frill
- Oriental Roller (D/850)
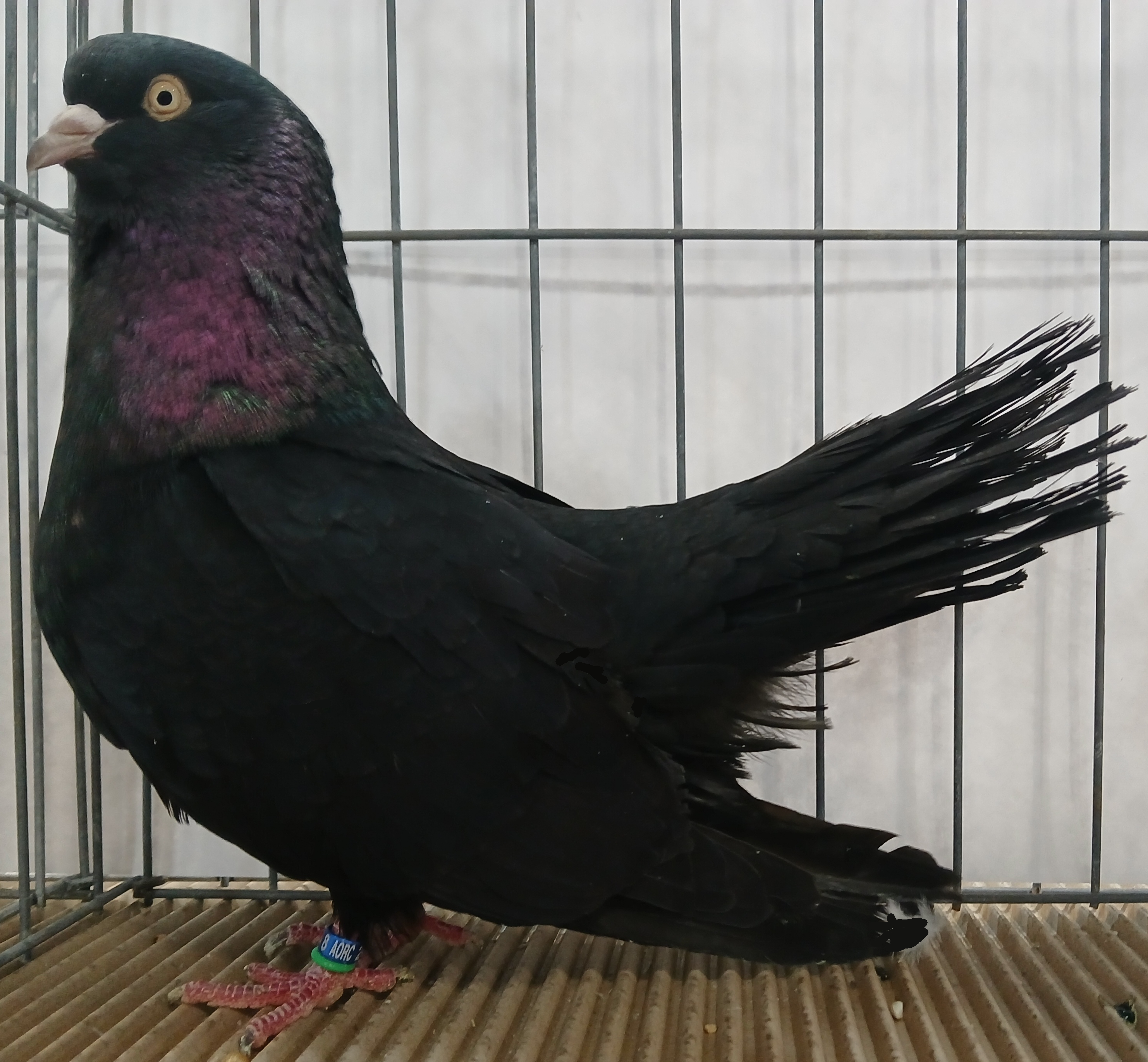
Oriental Roller Black

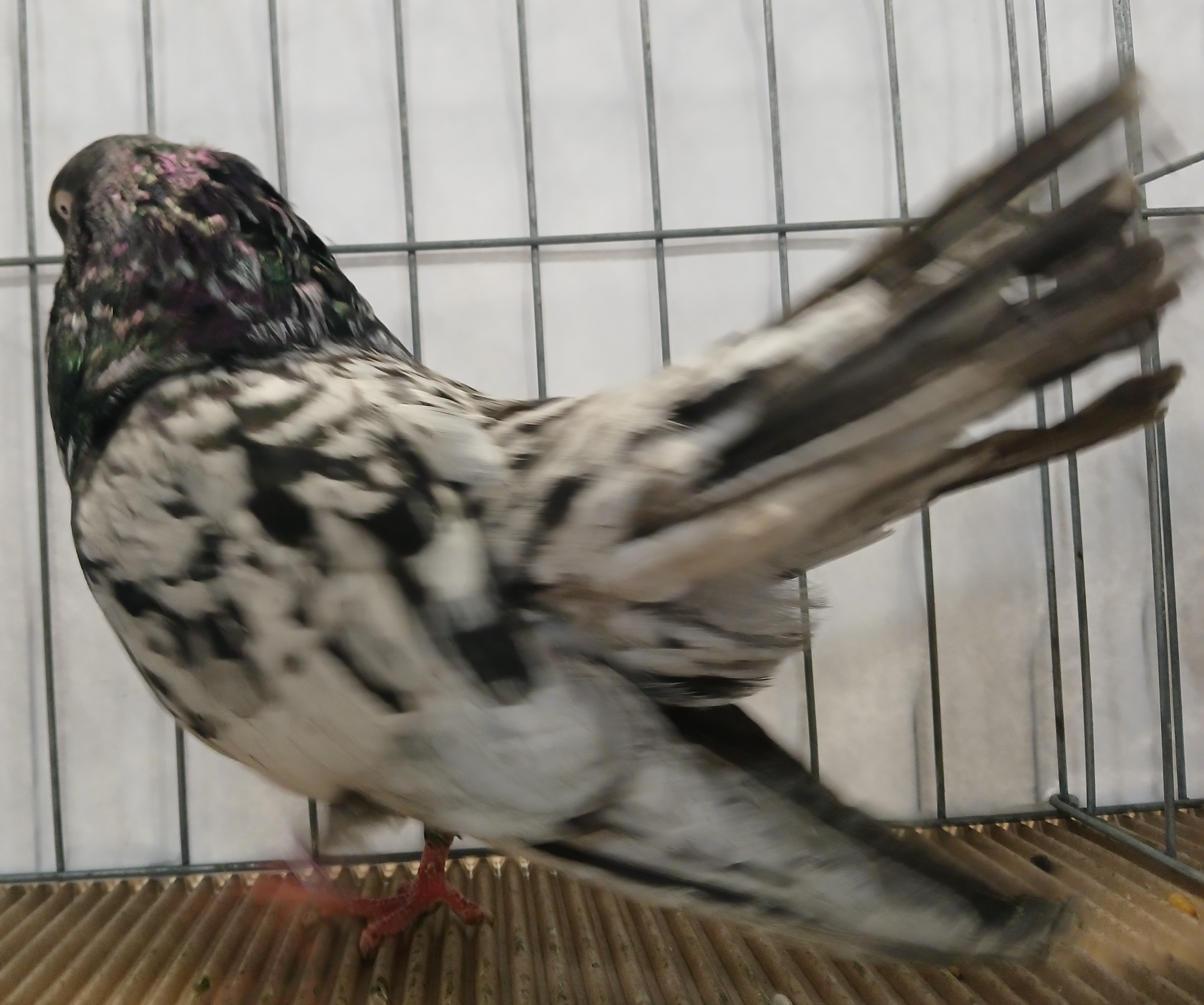
Oriental Roller Splash
- Orientale Eastslowakian Roller (SK/980)
- Oriental Turbit
- Ostrava Bagdad (CZ/109)
- Ostrowiec Wattle Pigeon (PL/117)

== P ==
- Pazardchin Roller (BG/992) (Bulgarian: Pazardziscki premetatsch (Benkalija))
- Pakistani Highflyer
- Pappatacci
- Parisian pouter (extinct)
- Parlor Roller = Parlor Tumbler
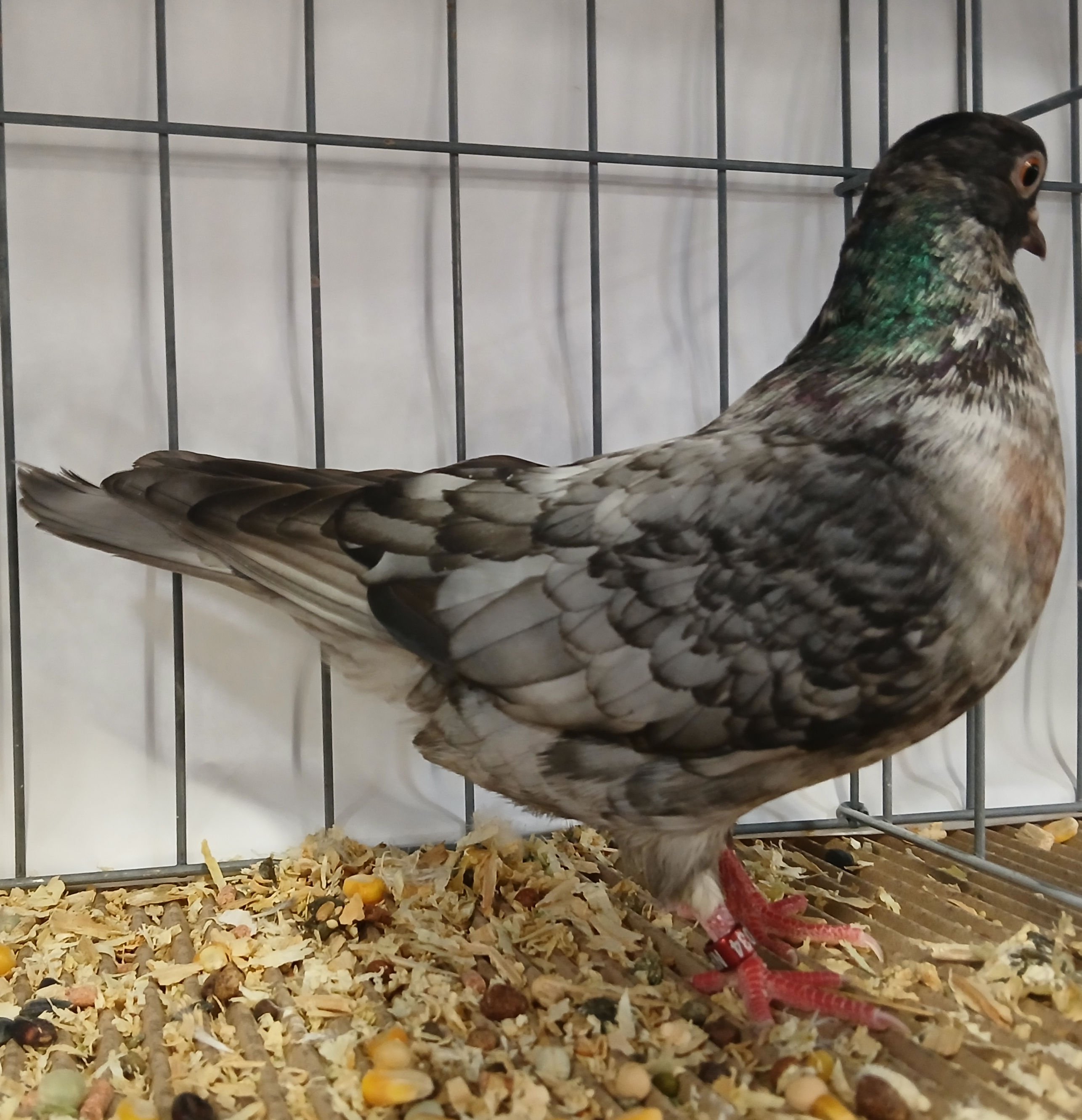
Almond
- Pemba Green Pigeon
- Persian Highflyer
- Pheasant
- Piacentino (I/004)
- Piestanau Giant Pigeon (SK/048)
- Pigmy Mariola
- Pigmy Pouter (GB/329)
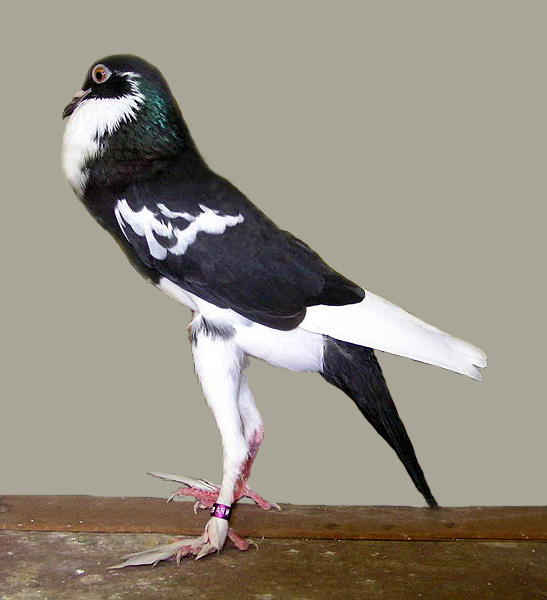
Pigmy Pouter
- Pinta Tumbler (E/926)
- Polish Bagdad (PL/114)
- Polish Barb
- Polish Beauty Homer (PL/065)
- Polish Crest Tumbler (PL/877) (Polish: Koroniarz koncaty)
- Polish Eagle pigeon (PL/963) (Polish: Orlik Polski)
- Polish Gansel Tumbler
- Polish Griwuni Tumbler (PL/937) (Polish: Grzywasc polski)
- Polish Helmet (= Polish Krymka Tumbler (PL/934))
- Polish Highflyer (= Galician Highflyer)
- Polish Kronen Tumbler
- Polish Krymka Tumbler (PL/934) (= Polish Helmet) (Polish: Krymka Polska)
- Polish Long-faced Tumbler (PL/802) (Polish: Polski Dlugodzioby Lotny)
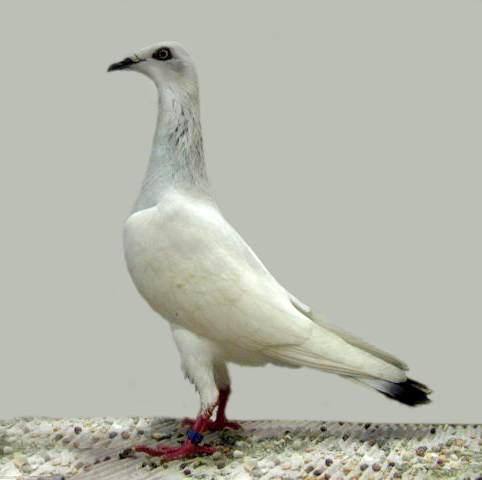
Polish Long-faced Tumbler, Ice
- Polish Lynx (D/024)
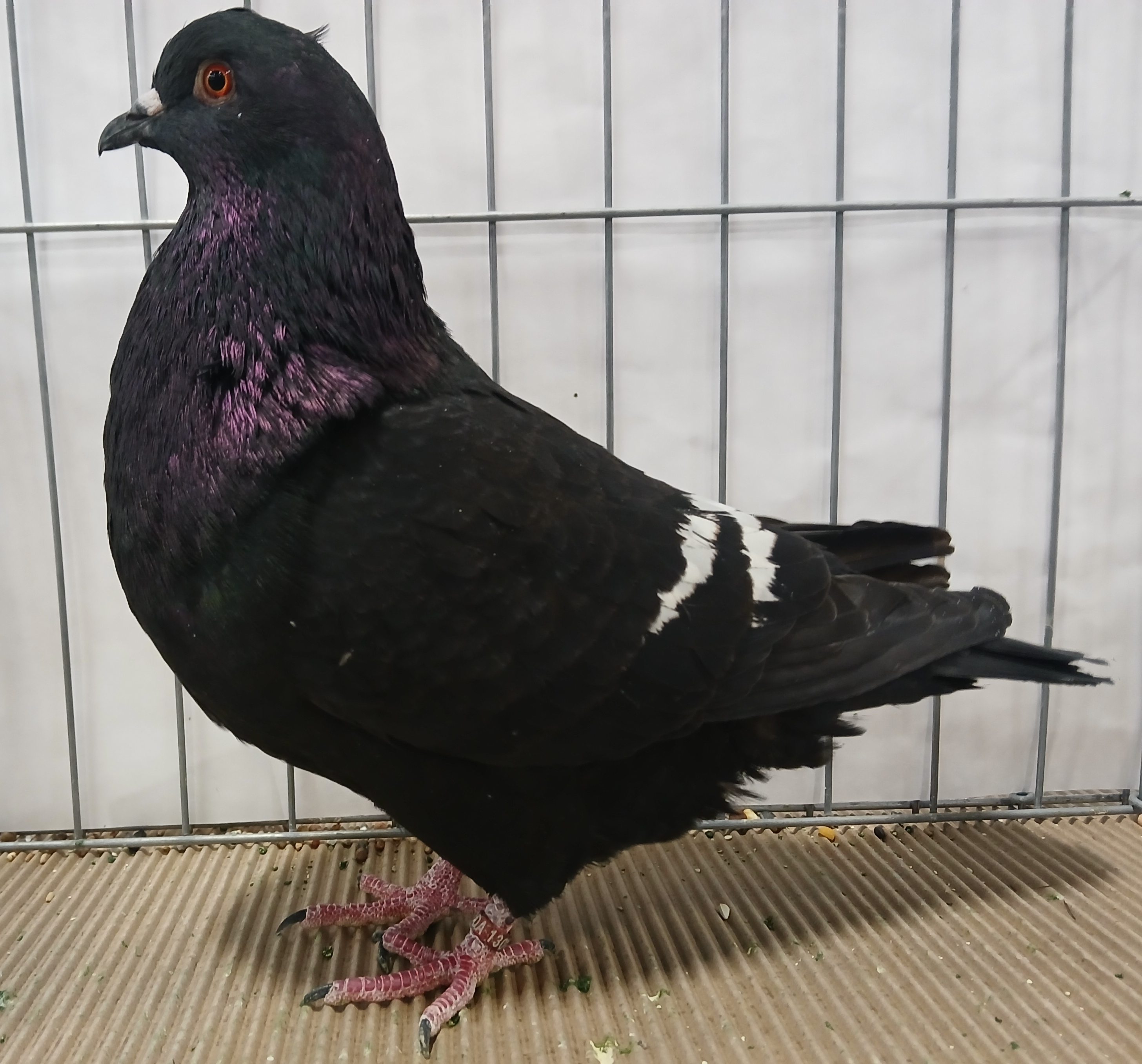
Polish Lynx Black with white bars

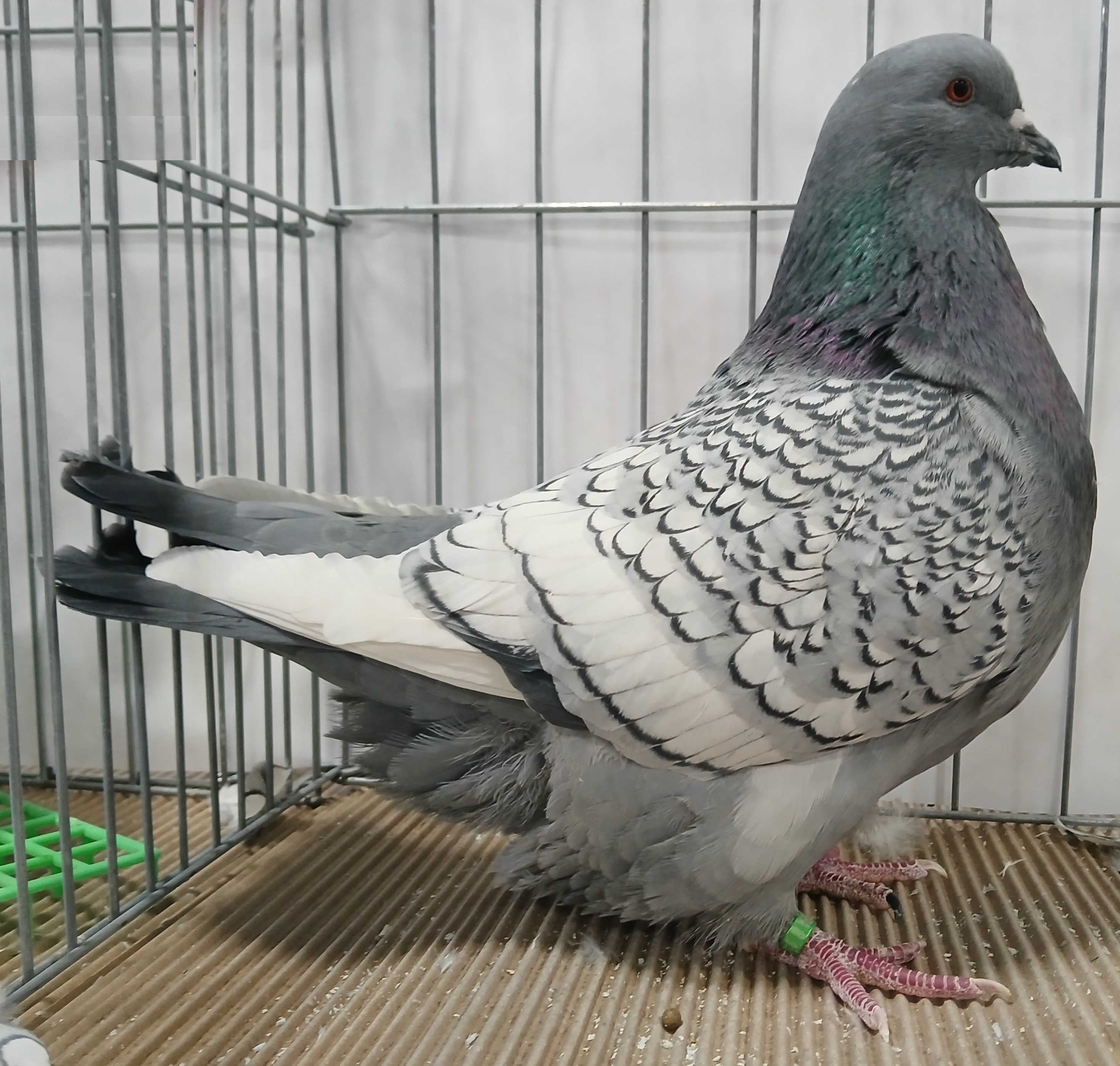
Polish Lynx White checked
- Polish Masciuch Tumbler (PL/960) (Polish: Masciuch Polski)
- Polish Murzyn
- Polish Orlik (= Ukrainian Skycutter, NPA; see also: Polish Eagle pigeon (PL/963) and Polish Wilna Eagle pigeon (PL/964))
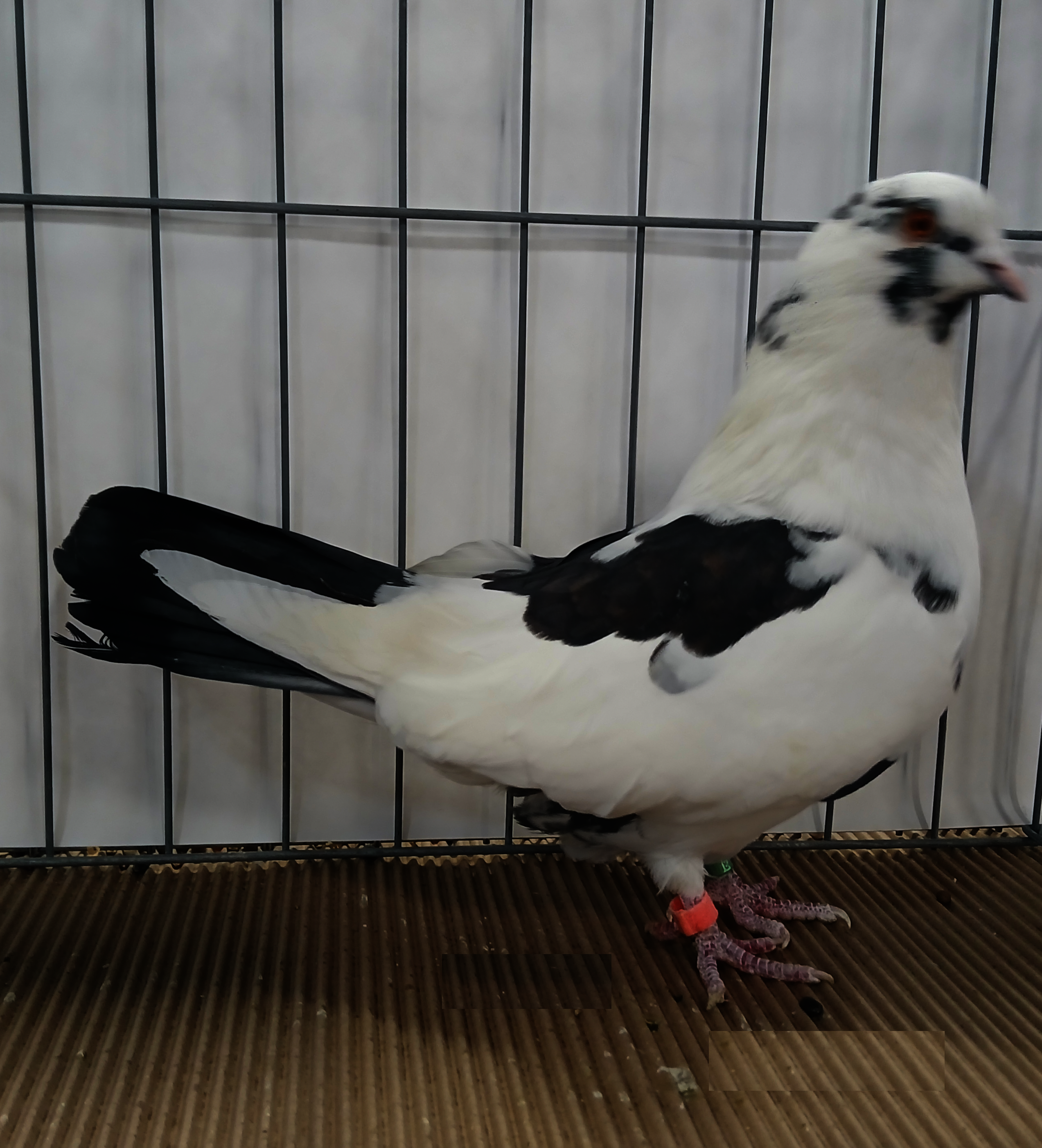
Ukrainian Sky Cutter
- Polish Owl pigeon (PL/724)
- Polish Shield Highflyer (PL/965) (Polish: Polski tarczowy wysokolotny)
- Polish Short-beaked Tumbler (PL/948) (Polish: Polski Krótkodzioby)
- Polish Short-beaked Magpie Tumbler (PL/969) (Polish: Sroczka polska krótkodzioba)
- Polish Wattle Pigeon (PL/116)
- Polish Wilna Eagle pigeon (PL/964) (Polish: Orlik Wilenski)
- Pomeranian Cropper (D/303)
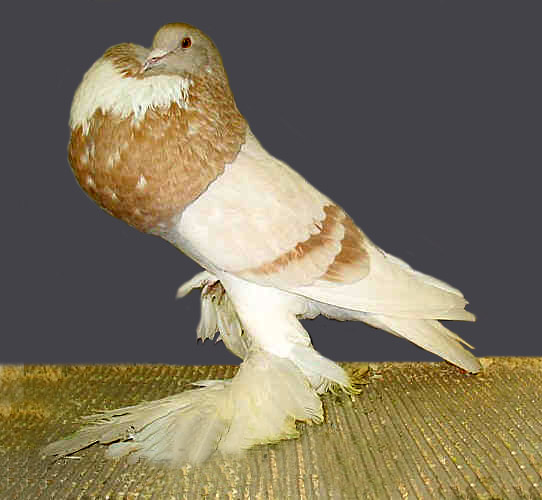
Pomeranian Cropper
- Pomeranian Show Crest Highflyer (D/817) (German: Pommersche Schaukappe)
- Portuguese Tumbler (P/921) (Portuguese: Cambalhota Português)
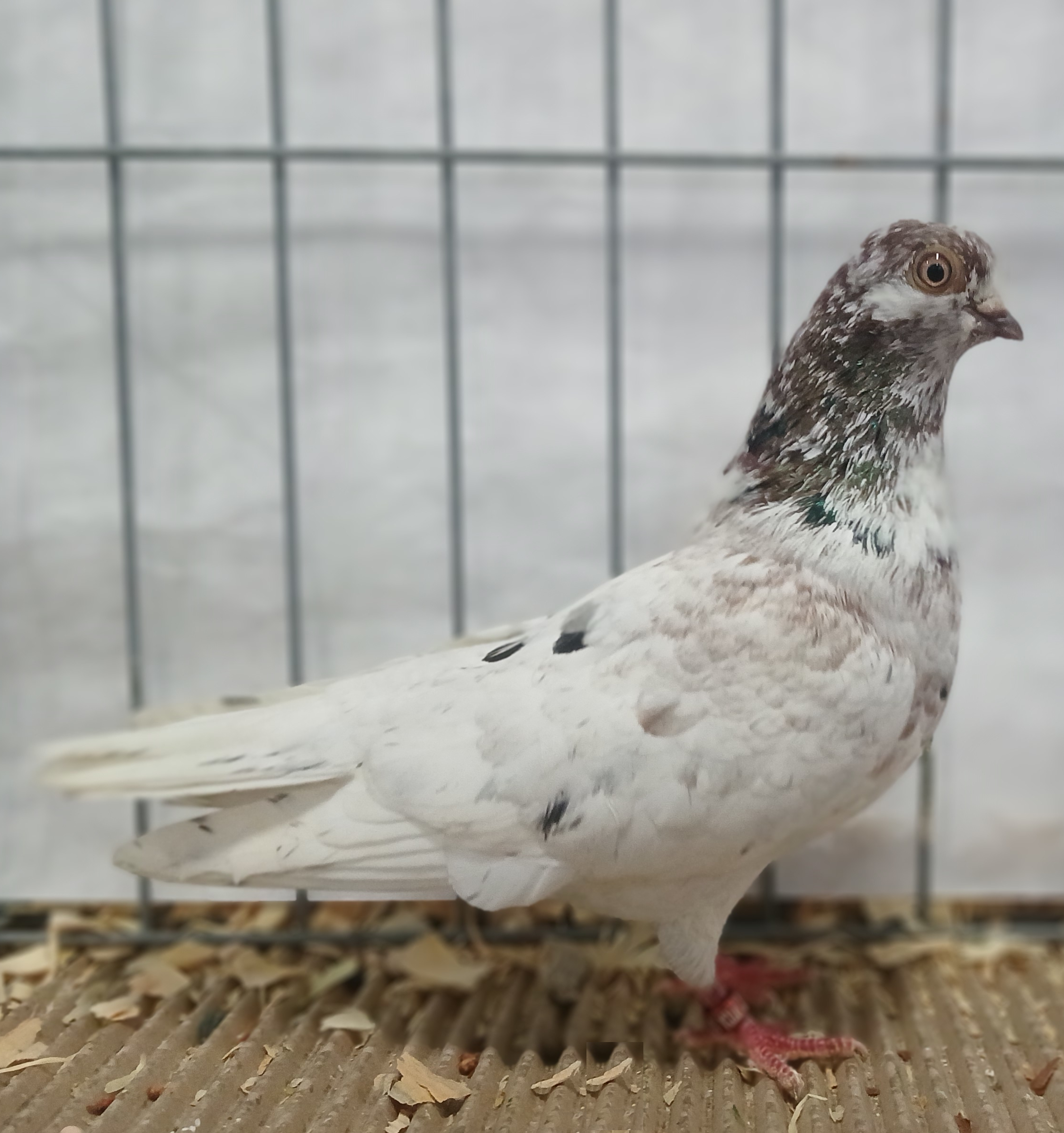
Portuguese Tumbler

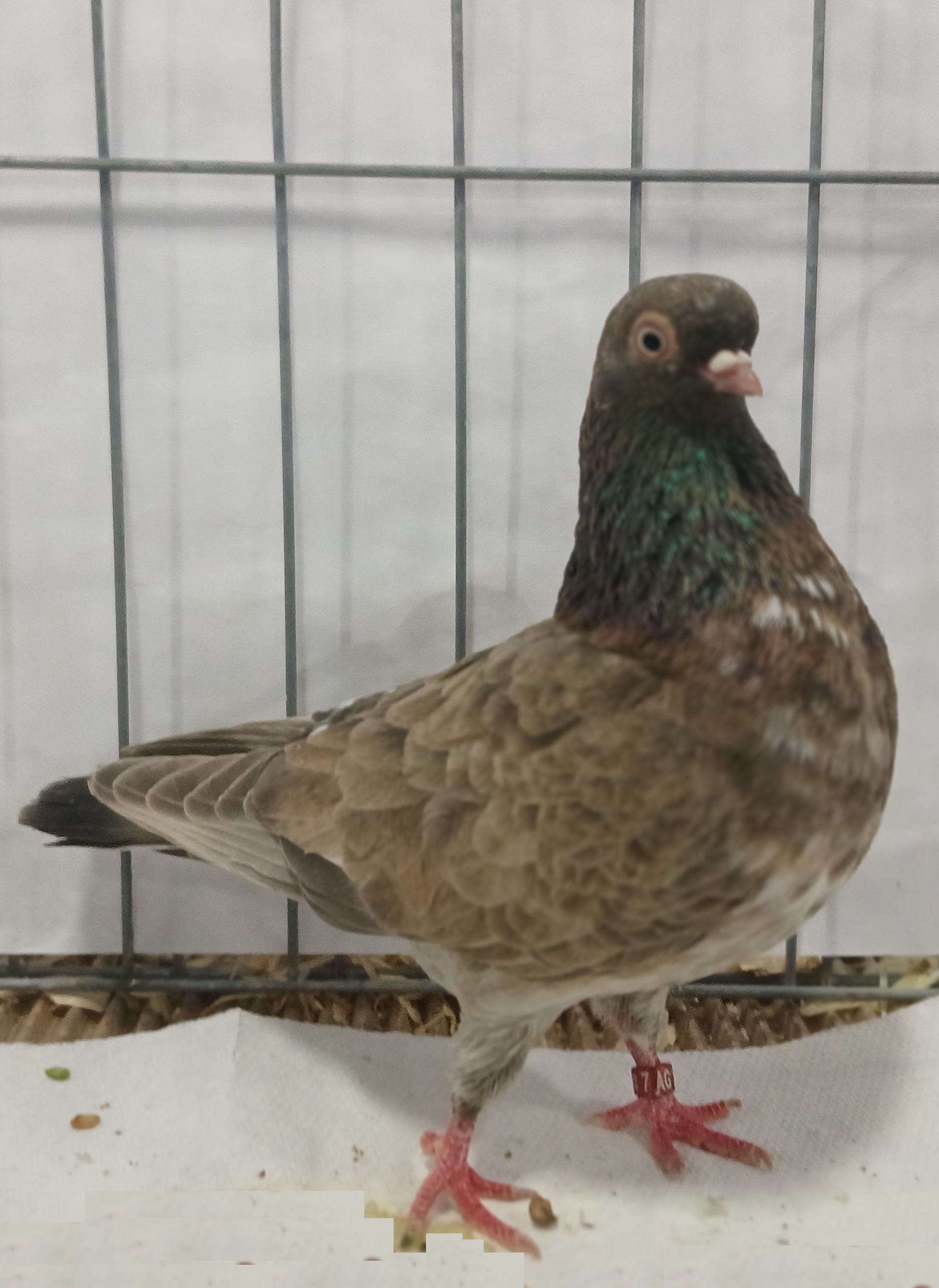
Portuguese Tumbler
- Posen Colour-head Tumbler (D/910) (German: Posener Farbenkopf)
- Poster (CH/485)
- Prachen Kanik (CZ/021)
- Prague Short-faced Tumbler(CZ/913) (Czech: Pražský rejdič krátkozobý)
- Prague Medium-faced Tumbler
- Prishtina Roller
- Ptarmigan pigeon (GB/611)

== Q ==
- Quet Roller

== R ==
- Racing Homer
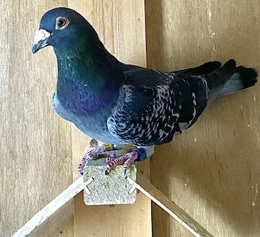
Homing Pigeon Blue check
- Rafeno Cropper (E/335)
- Rakovnik Roller (CZ/885)
- Rawson Short-faced Tumbler
- Razgrad Roller (BG/993)
- Refilador Tumbler (E/925)
- Regensburg Tumbler (D/852)
- Reinaugen Tumbler (= Koenigsberg Reinaugen Tumbler (D/906))
- Renaisien (B/051)
- Revellois (F/013)
- Reverse-wing Colour Pigeon (D/476) (German: Verkehrtflügelfarbentaube)
- Reverse-wing Pouter (= Reverse-wing Cropper (D/304)) (German: Verkehrtflügelkröpfer)
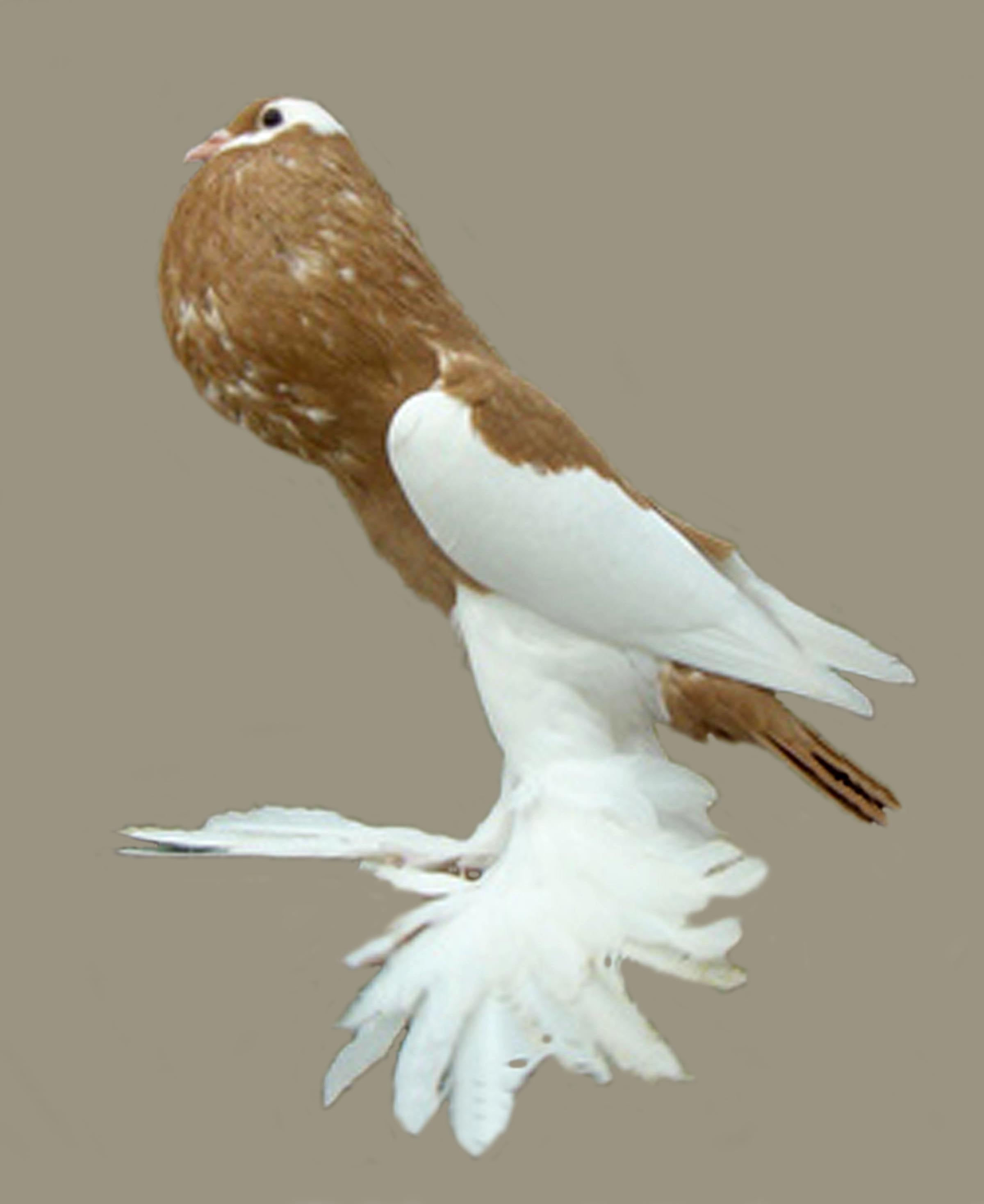
Reverse-wing
- Rhine Ring-beater (D/1103)
- Ribbon-tail Tumbler (RUS^{(D)}/866)
- Riga Tumbler (D/823)
- Rollers, a breed group
- Romagnol (I/005)
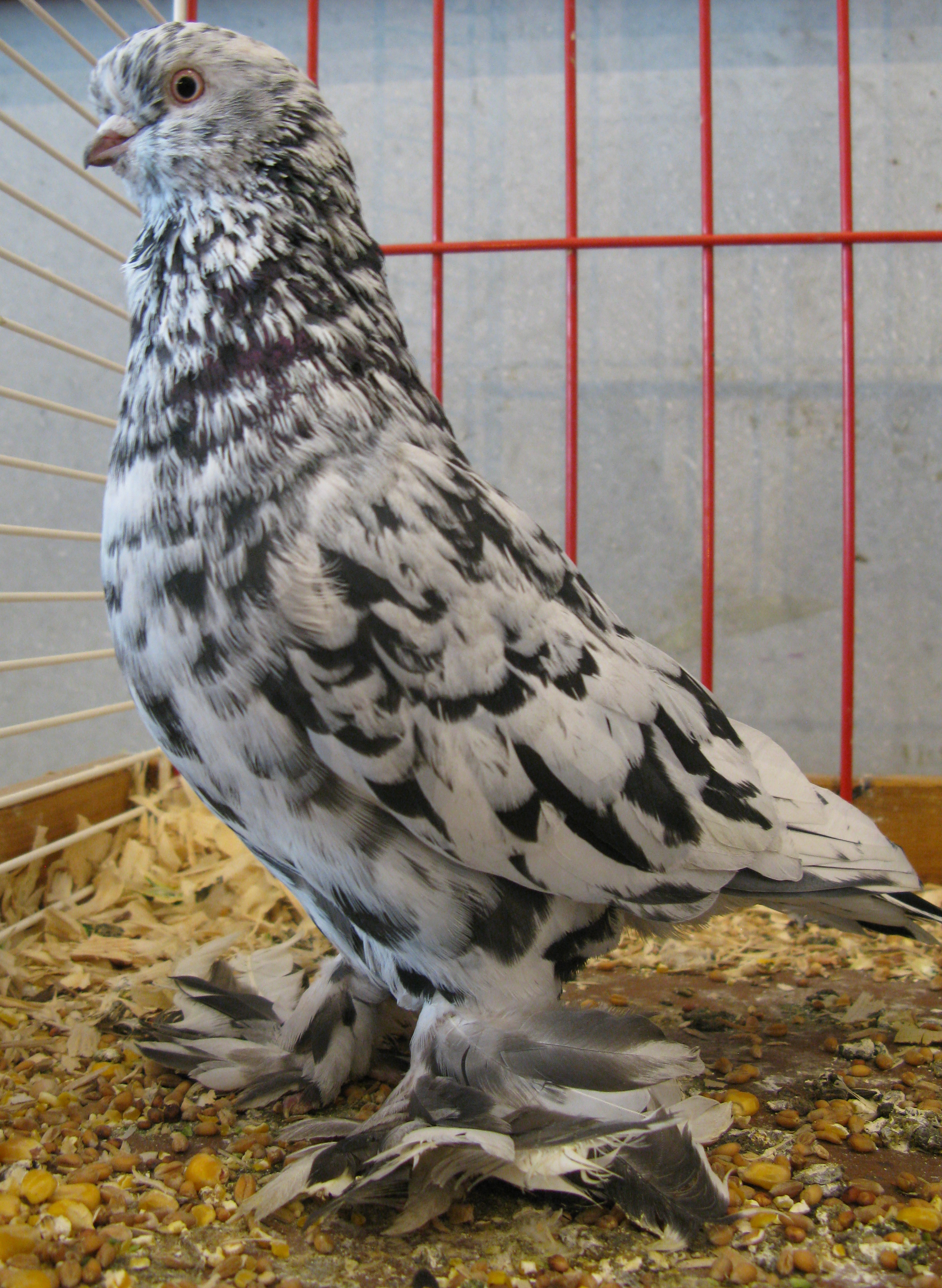
Romagnol
- Romanian Argintiu Tumbler
- Romanian Barred Highflyer (RO/978) (Romanian: Zburator Dungat Romanesc)
- Romanian Beard
- Romanian Black-cherry Tumbler
- Romanian Blind Tumbler
- Romanian Blue-barred White-tail
- Romanian Cherry-coloured Highflyer (RO/1002) (Romanian: Zburator Visiniu Romanesc)
- Romanian Coffee-coloured Tumbler
- Romanian Gagiu
- Romanian Magpie Tumbler (RO^{(D)}/854) (Romanian: Jucator Baltat de Bucaresti)
- Romanian Moriscar Roller
- Romanian Naked-neck Tumbler (= Naked-neck Tumbler (RO^{(D)}/853))
- Romanian Silvery Tumbler
- Romanian Orbetean Tumbler (= Orbetean Romanian Rust-coloured Highflyer (RO/1003))
- Romanian Tshoong Tumbler
- Romanian White-tail Tumbler (RO^{(D)}/855) (Romanian: Porumbii jucatori romenesti codalbi)
- Romanian Satu-Mare Tumbler
- Roshan Chirag
- Rostock Tumbler (D/901)
- Rostov Tumbler (RUS^{(D)}/873)
- Roubaisien (F/052)
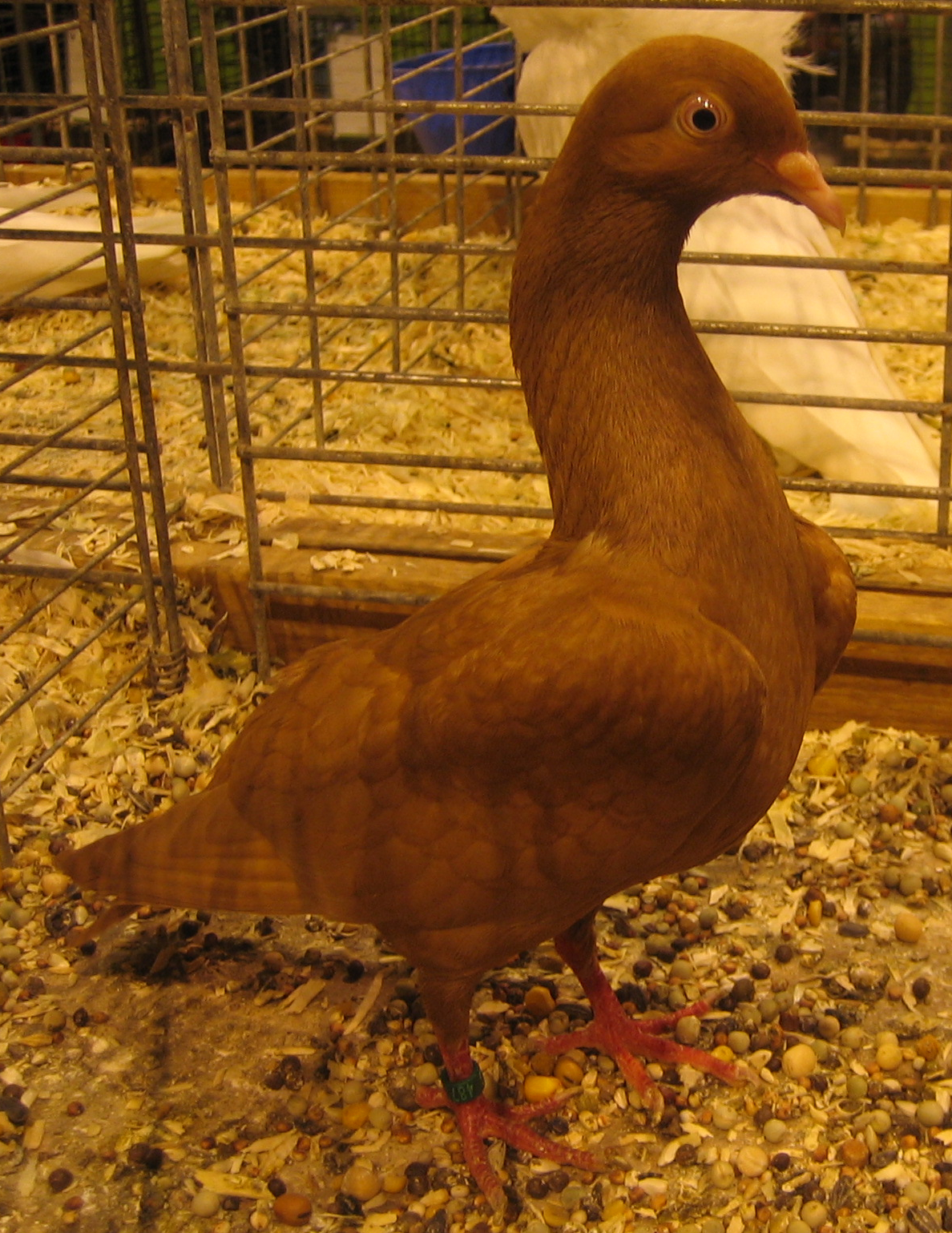
Red Roubaisien
- Royal Snow Tumbler
- Runt (F/001)
- Russe Blue Tumbler (BG/995) (Bulgarian: Rusenski siv (mavija))
- Russe Tschilbolli (BG/996) (Bulgarian: Rusenski tschilbolija)
- Russe Tumbler (BG/994) (Bulgarian: Rusenski topgerdanlija)
- Russian Akkermann Tumbler
- Russian Martini
- Russian Tumbler
- Rzhev Star-tail Tumbler (= Ribbon-tail Tumbler (RUS^{(D)}/866))
- Indian Rampuri

== S ==
- Saar Pigeon (D/011)
- Saddle Homer
- Saint
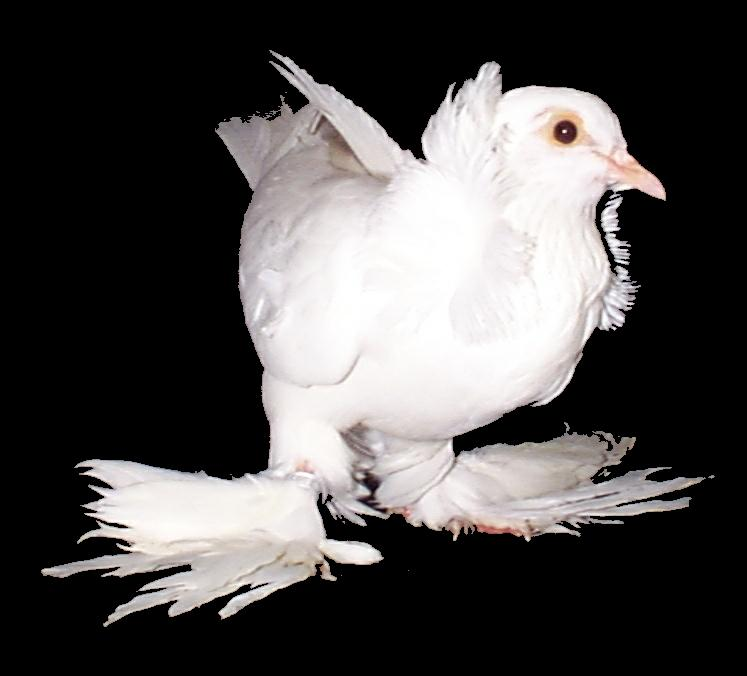
Saint Pigeon White YH
- Saint Gallen Wing Pigeon (CH/431)
- Saint Louis Arch Crested Fantail
- Sarajewo Roller (BiH/888)
- Satu-Mare Tumbler
- Saxon Breast (D/474)
- Saxon Crescent Pigeon (D/473)
- Saxon Cropper (D/316)
- Saxon Fairy Swallow pigeon
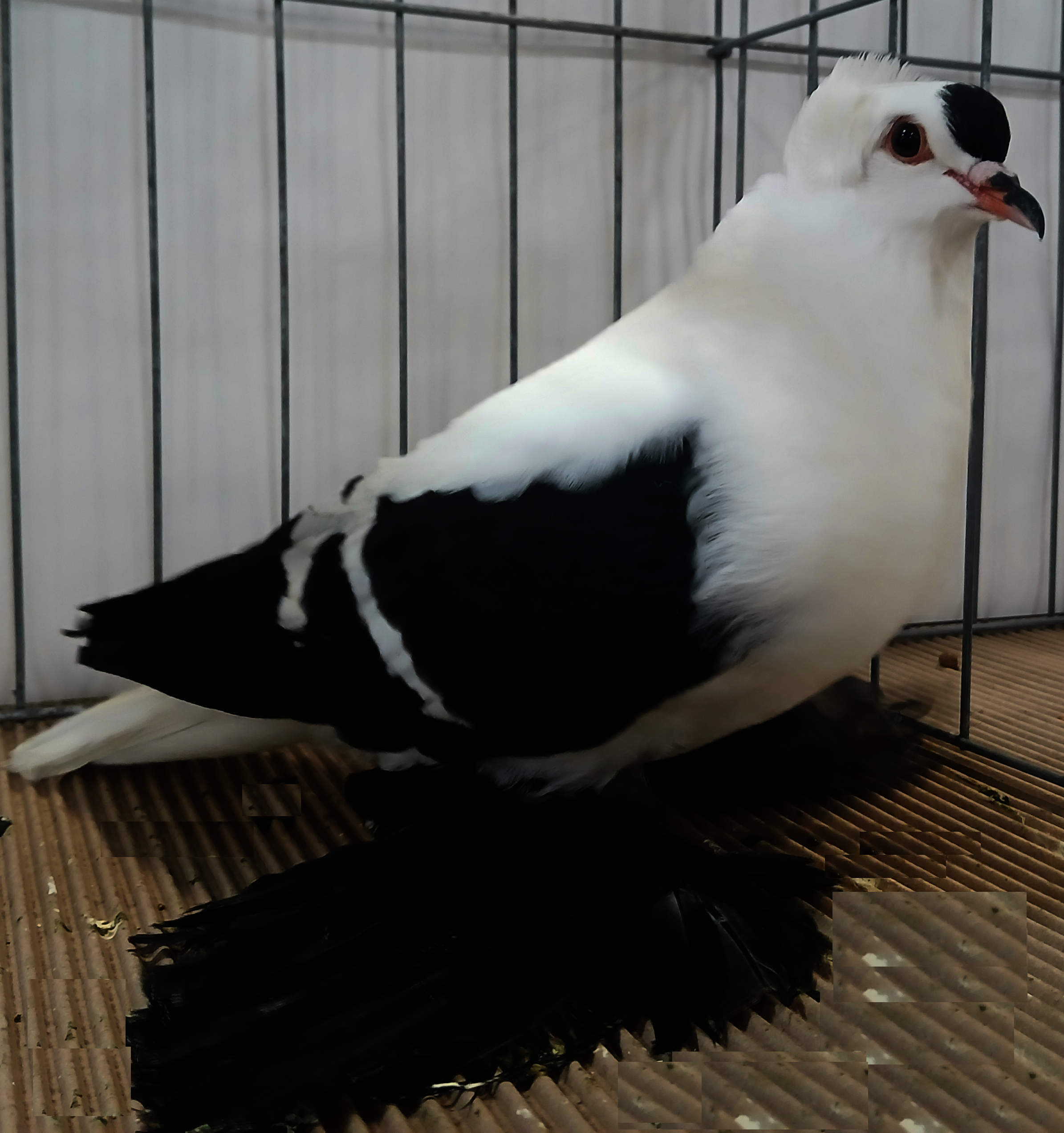
Fairy Swallow

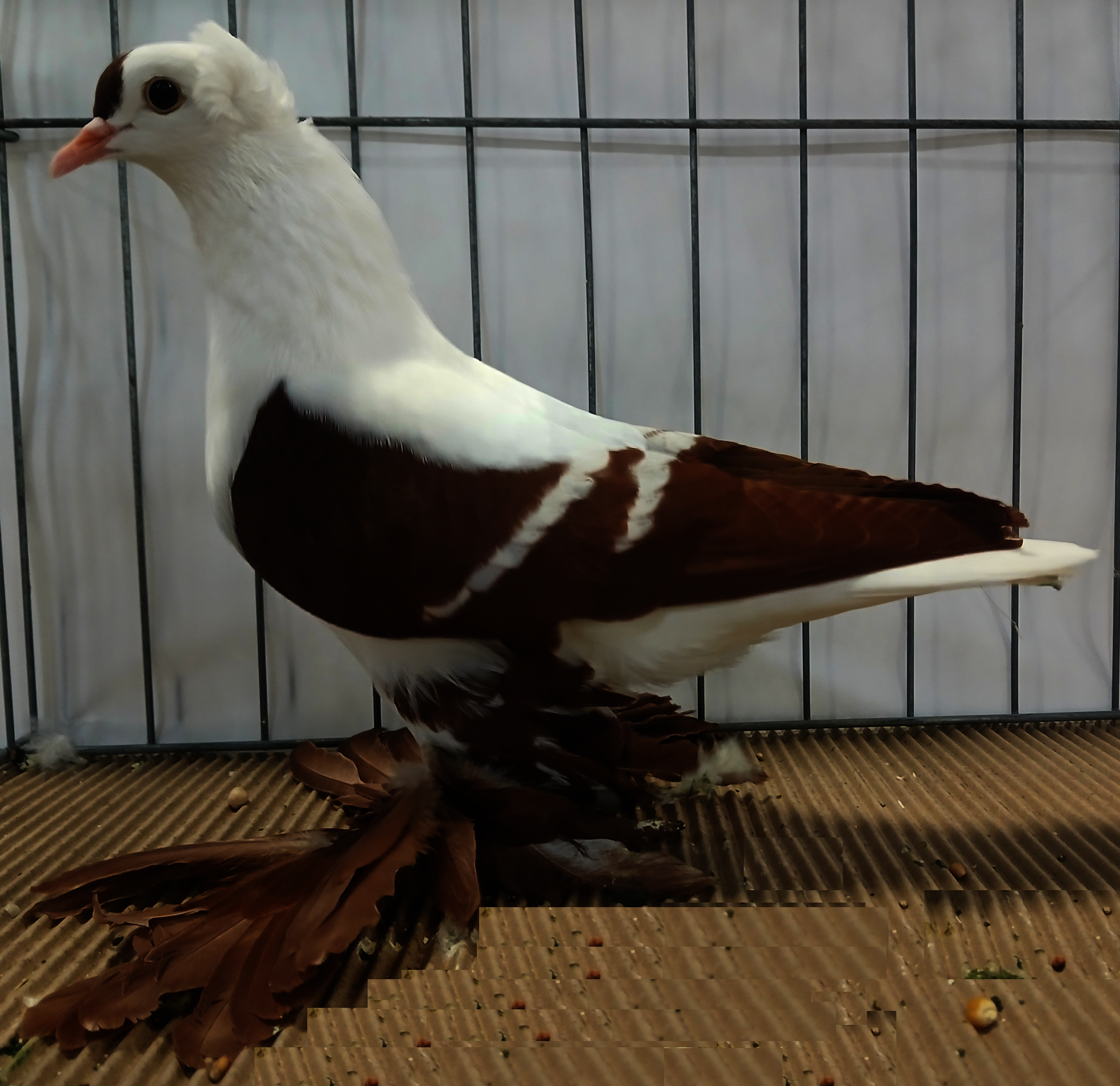
Fairy Swallow
- Saxon Field Pigeon (D/475)
- Saxon Monk (D/467)
- Saxon Priest (D/466)
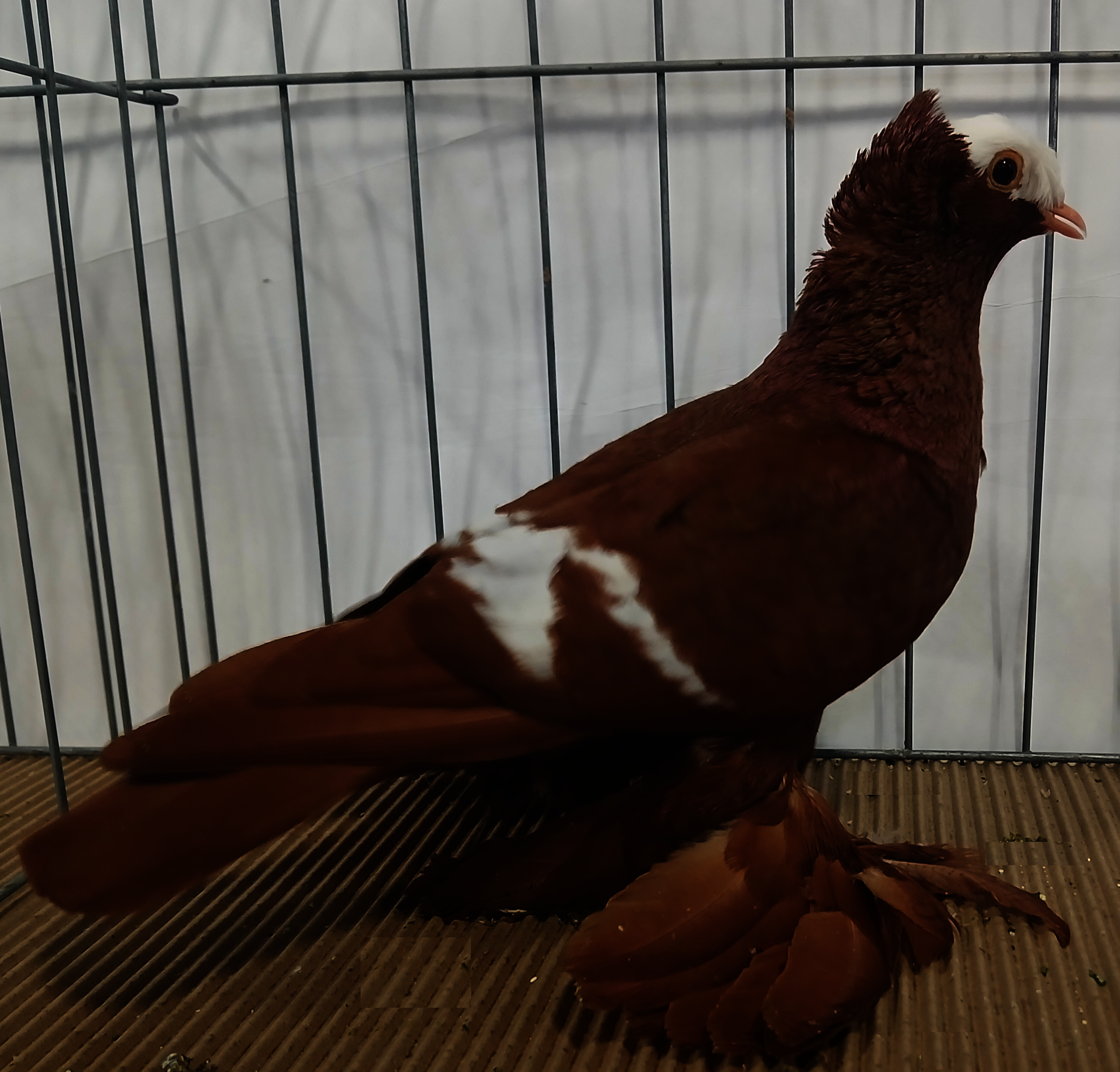
Saxon Priest
- Saxon Shield (D/471)
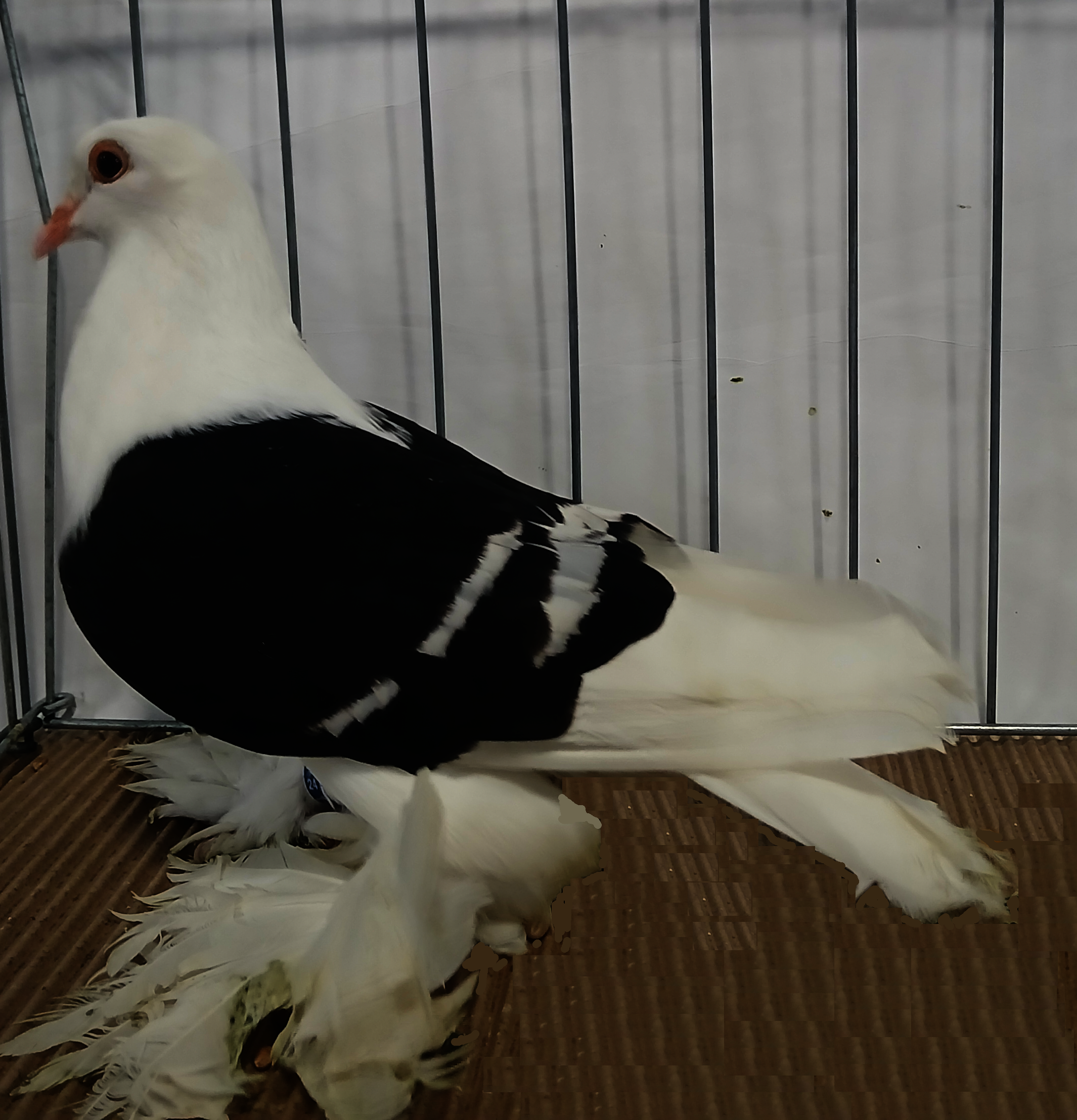
Saxon Shield
- Saxon Spot (D/472)
- Saxon Stork Pigeon (D/470)
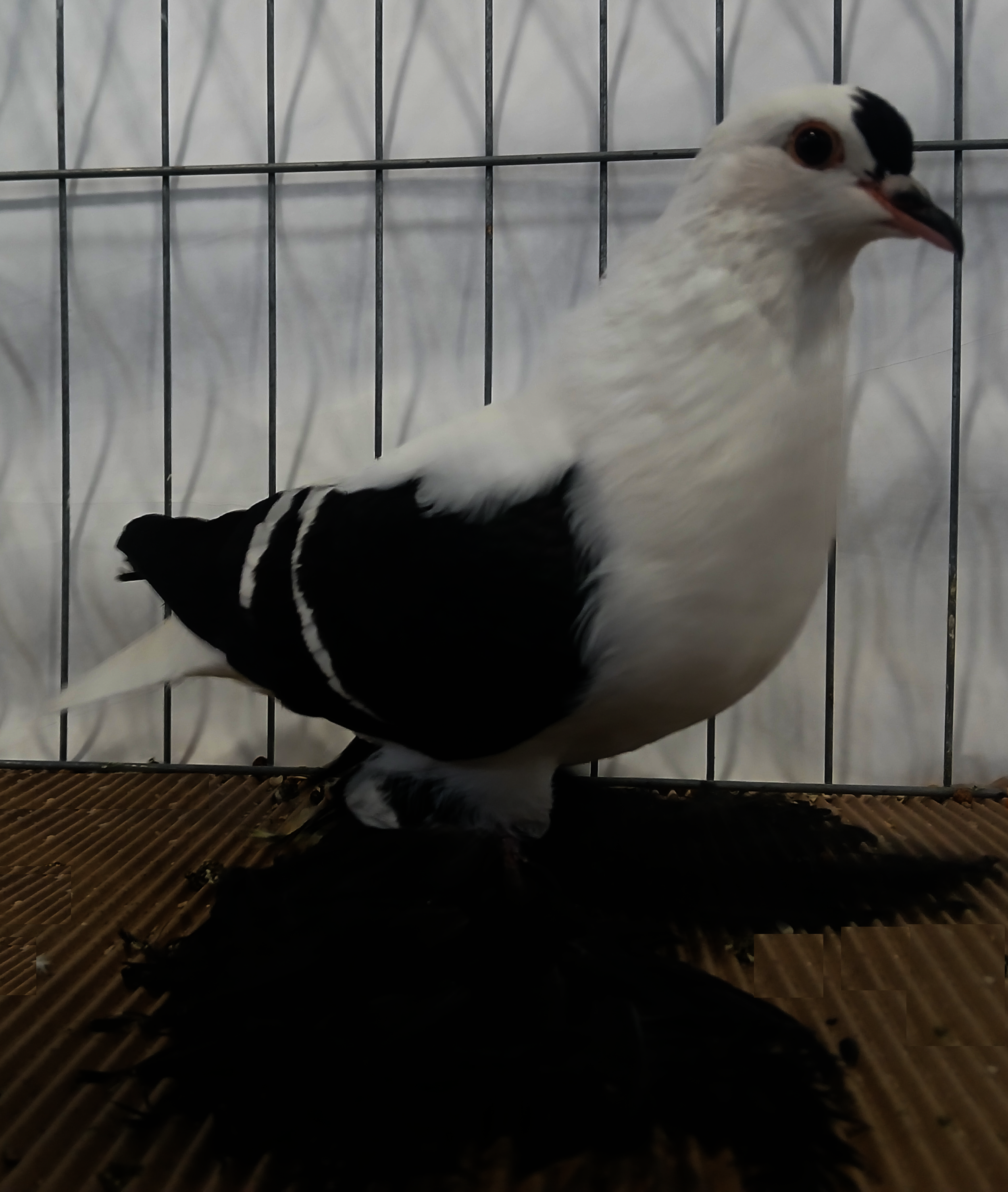
Saxon Stork
- Saxon Swallow pigeon (D/468)
- Saxon White-tail (D/465)
- Saxon Wing Pigeon (D/469)
- Scandaroon (D/105)
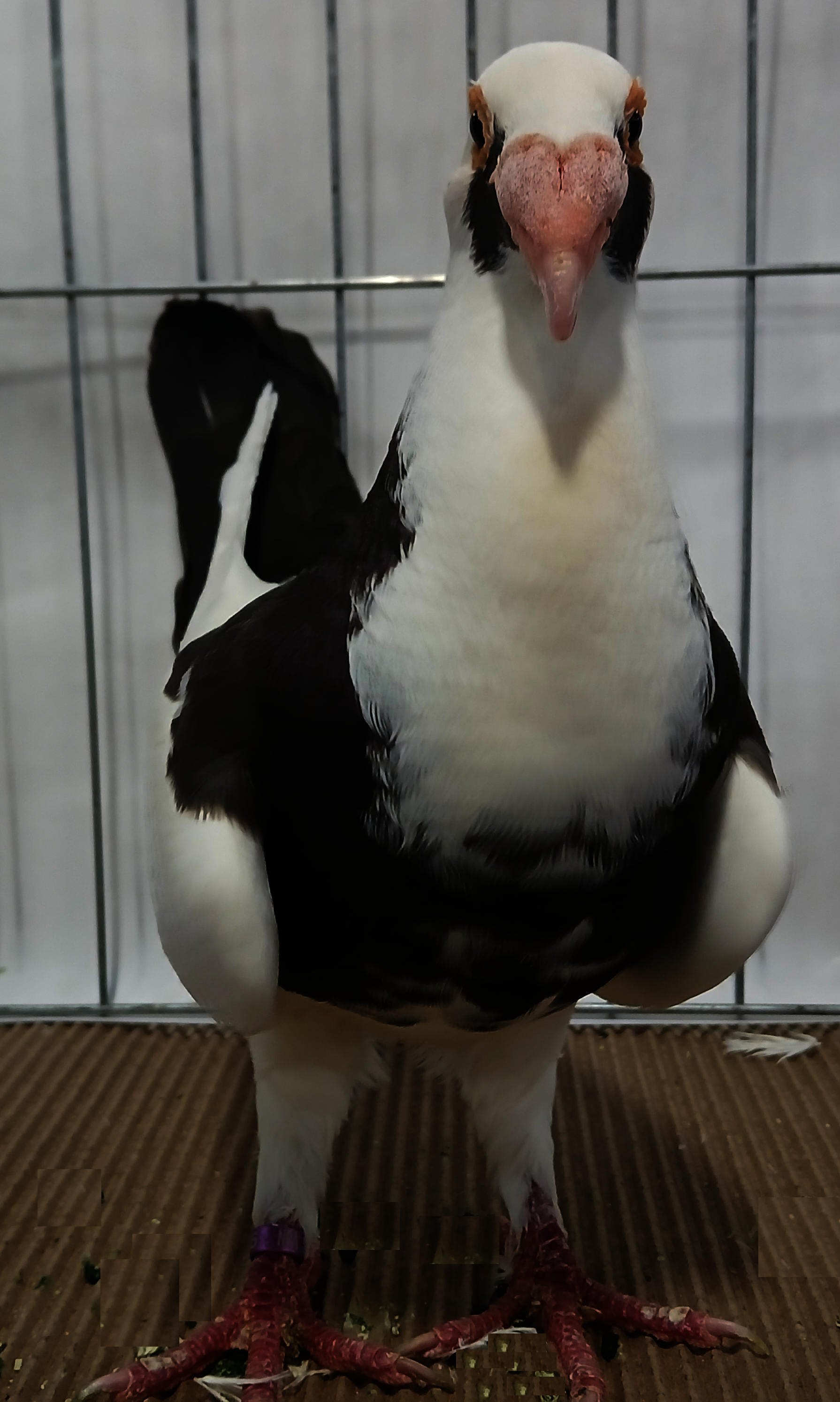
Scandaroon
- Schalaster Pouter
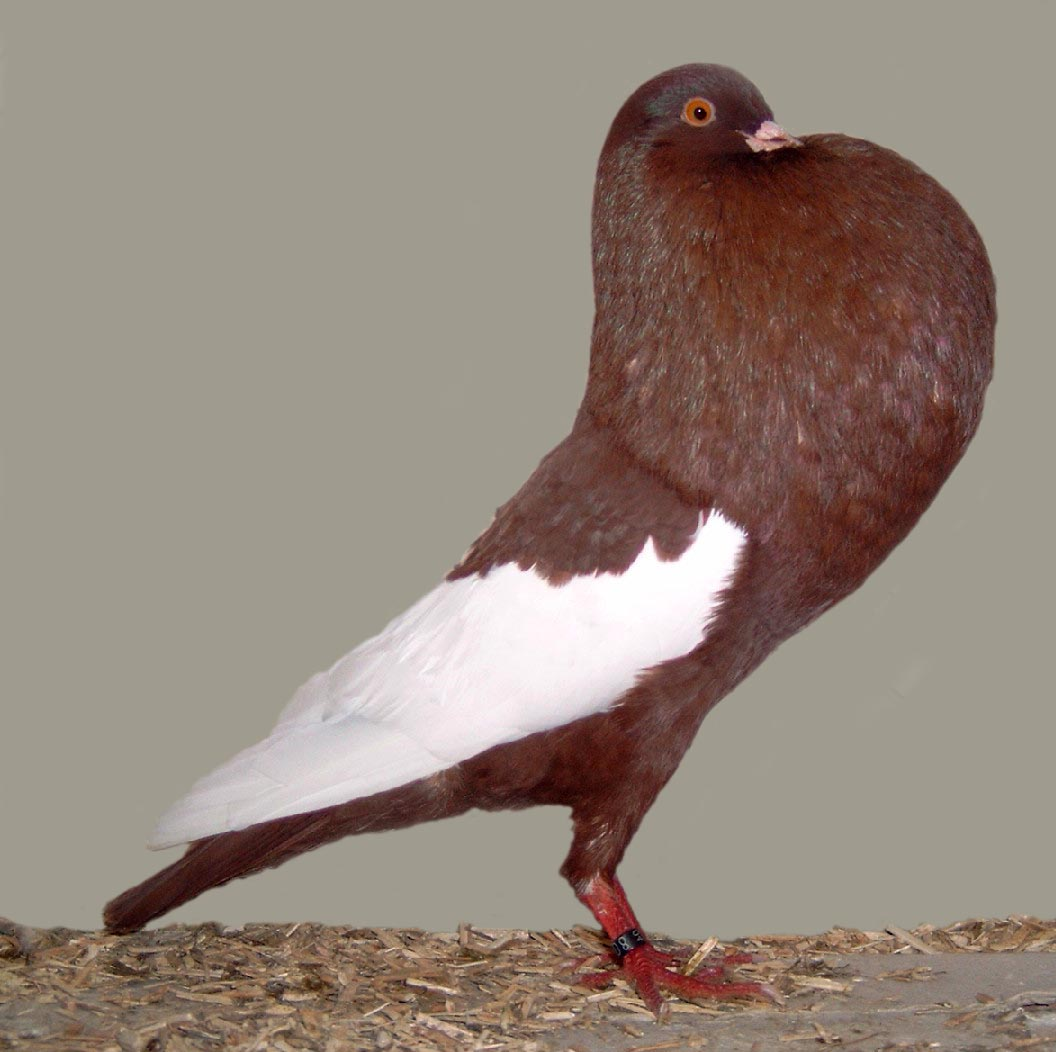
Schalaster Pouter
- Schmalkalden Moorhead (D/602)
- Schmolln Trumpeter (D/511)
- Schoeneberg Barred Tumbler (D/903)
- Schumen Tumbler (BG/997)
- Seldschuk Pigeon (D/613)
- Seraphim Pigeon
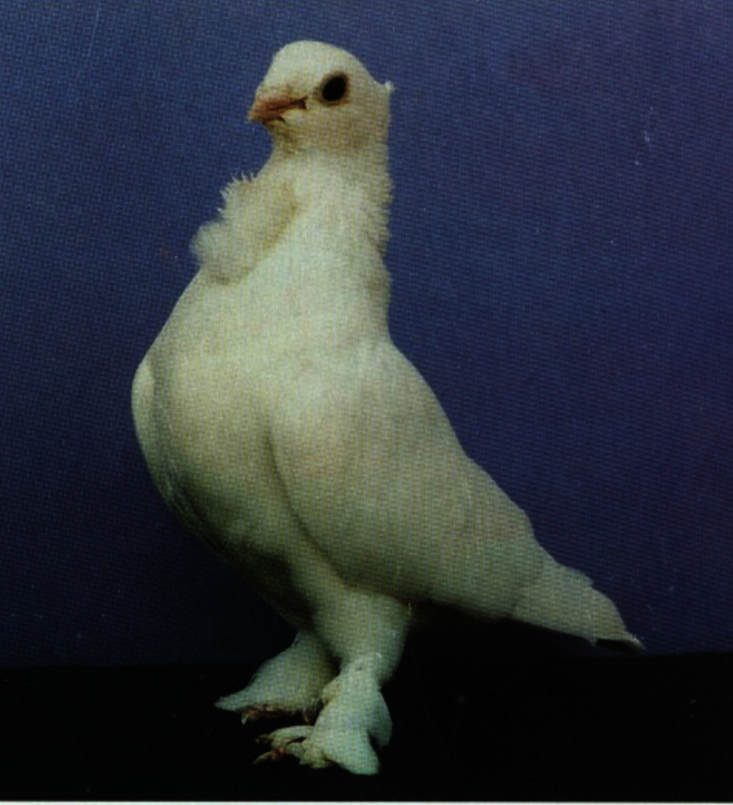
Seraphim
- Serbian Highflyer (SRB/886)
- Shack Kee
- Shakhsharli
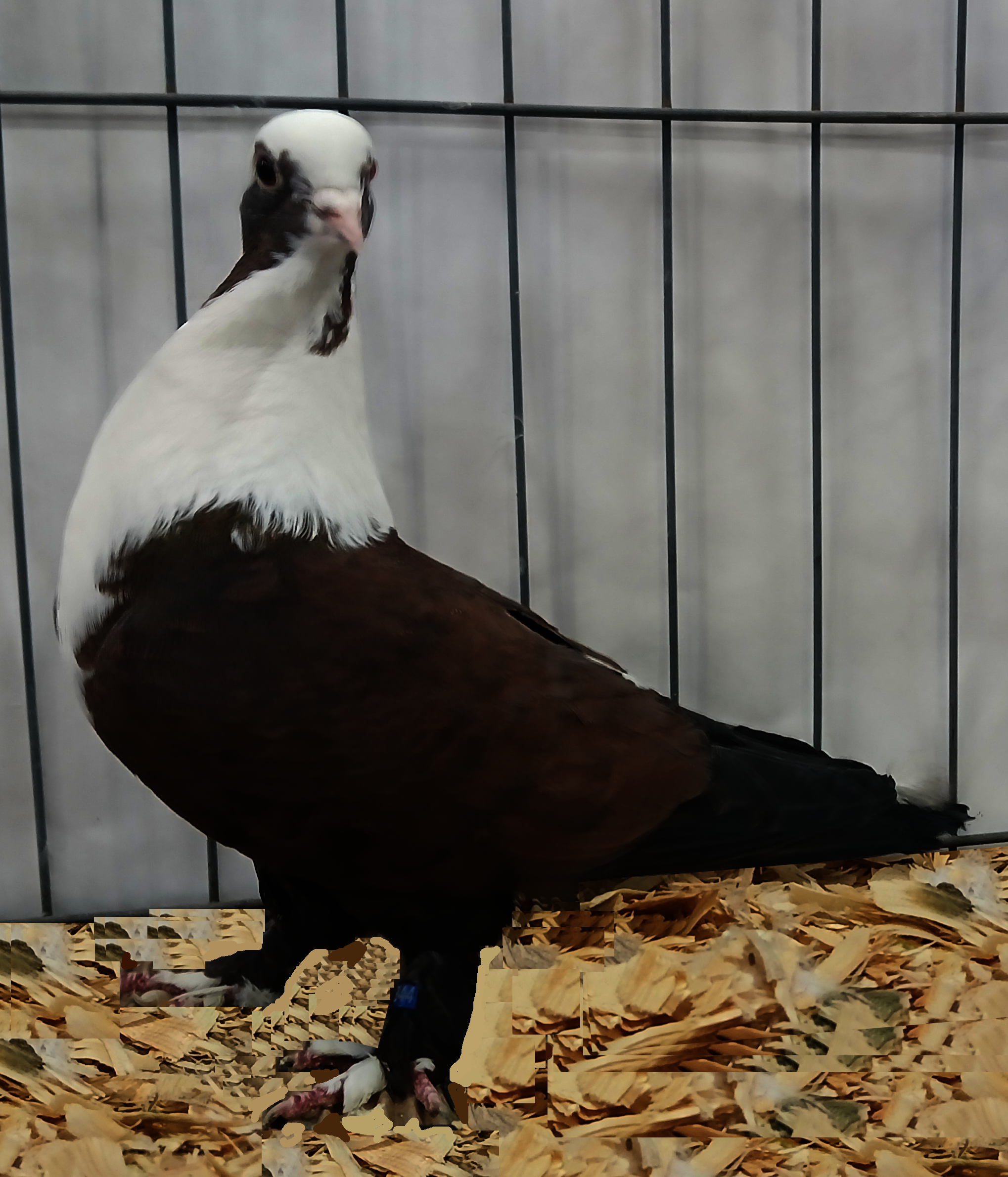
Shakhsharli Bronze

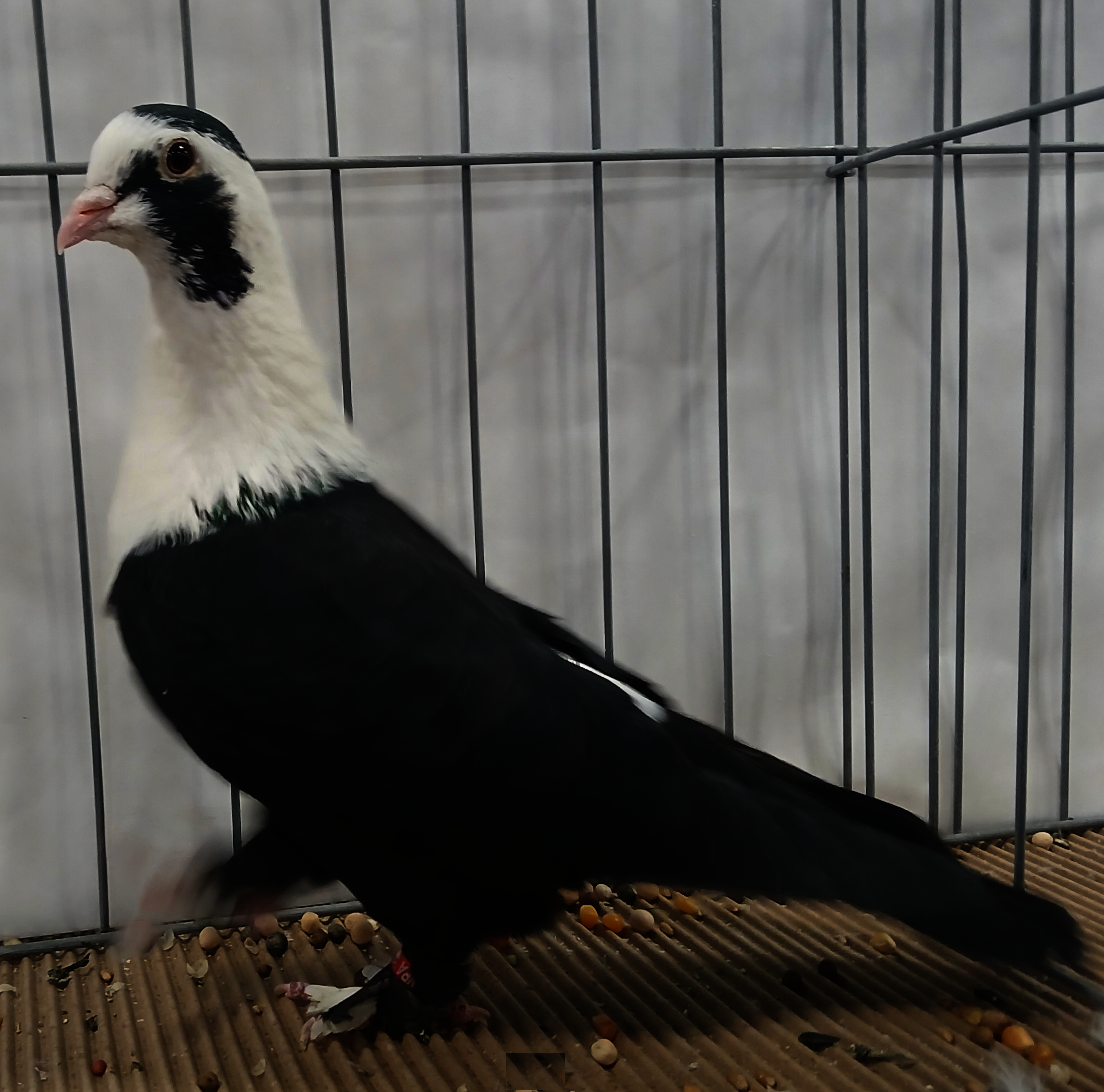
Shakhsharli Black
- Shiraz Tumbler (D/920)
- Short-beaked Armavir Tumbler (RUS^{(D)}/841)
- Short-faced Gansel Tumbler (H/842)
- Show Antwerp (GB/026)
- Show Homer (GB/027)
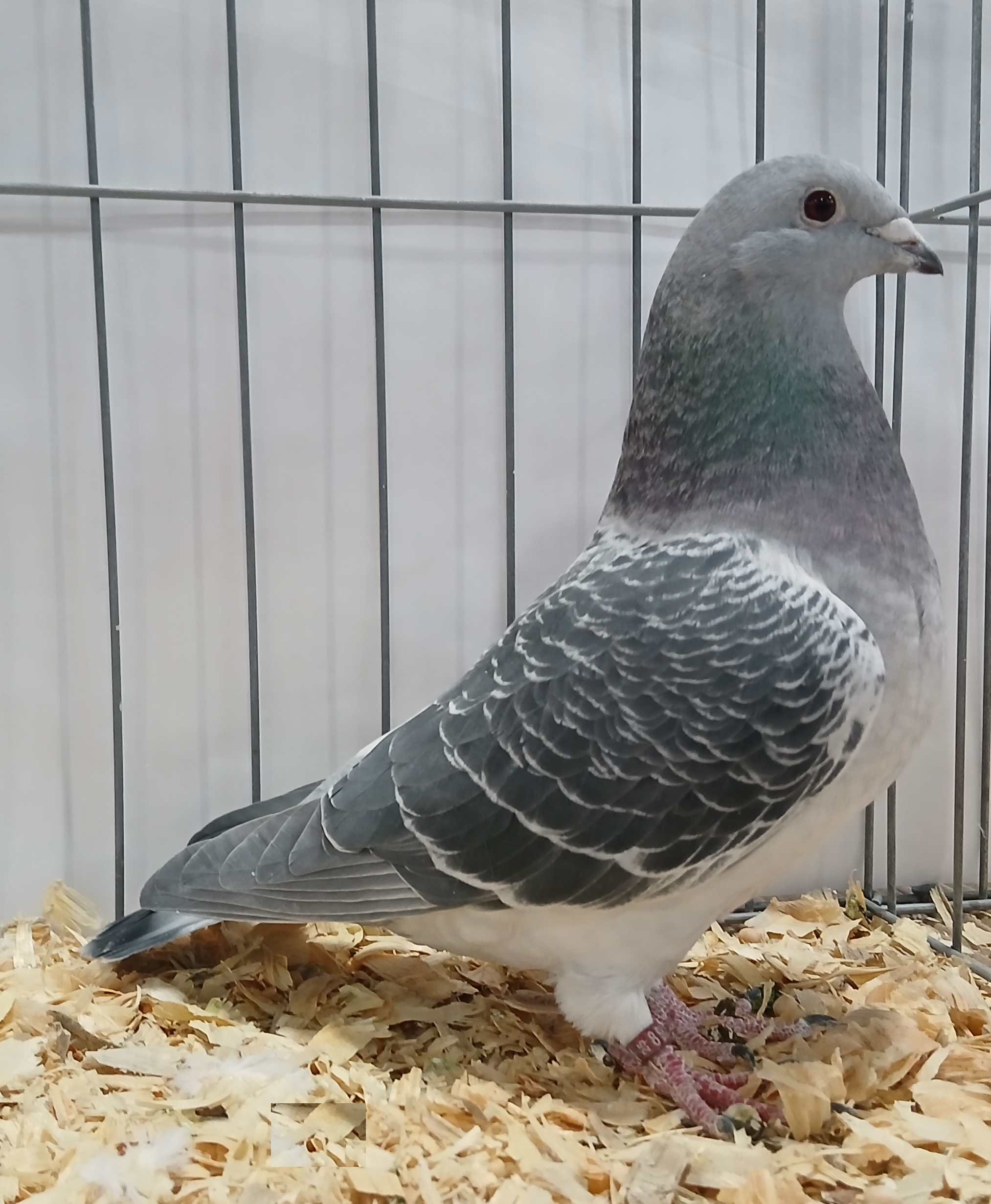
Show Homer Blue check

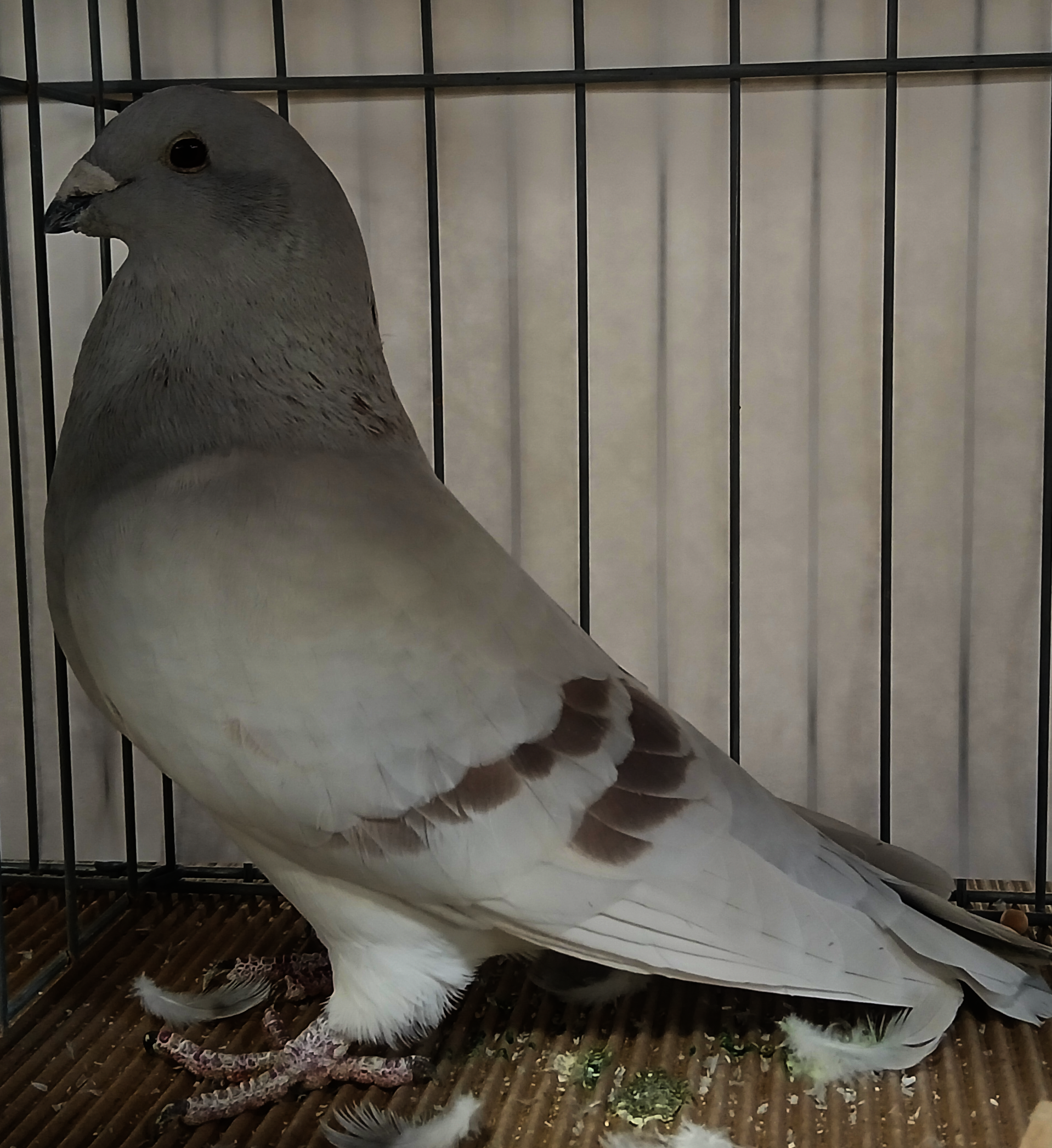
Show Homer Powdered red bar

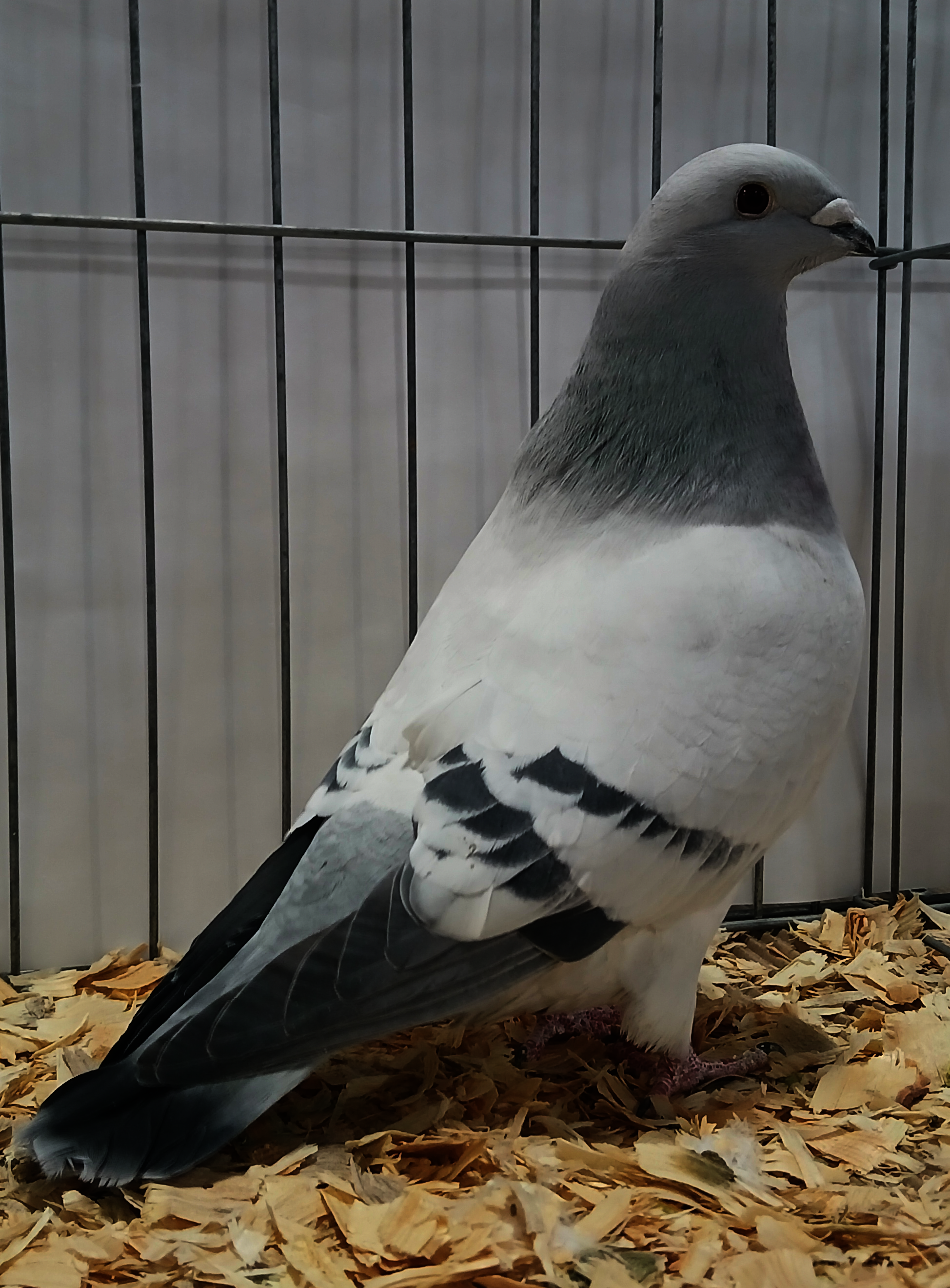
Show Homer Powdered blue bar
- Showpen Homer = Show Racing Homer, American Show Racing Homer
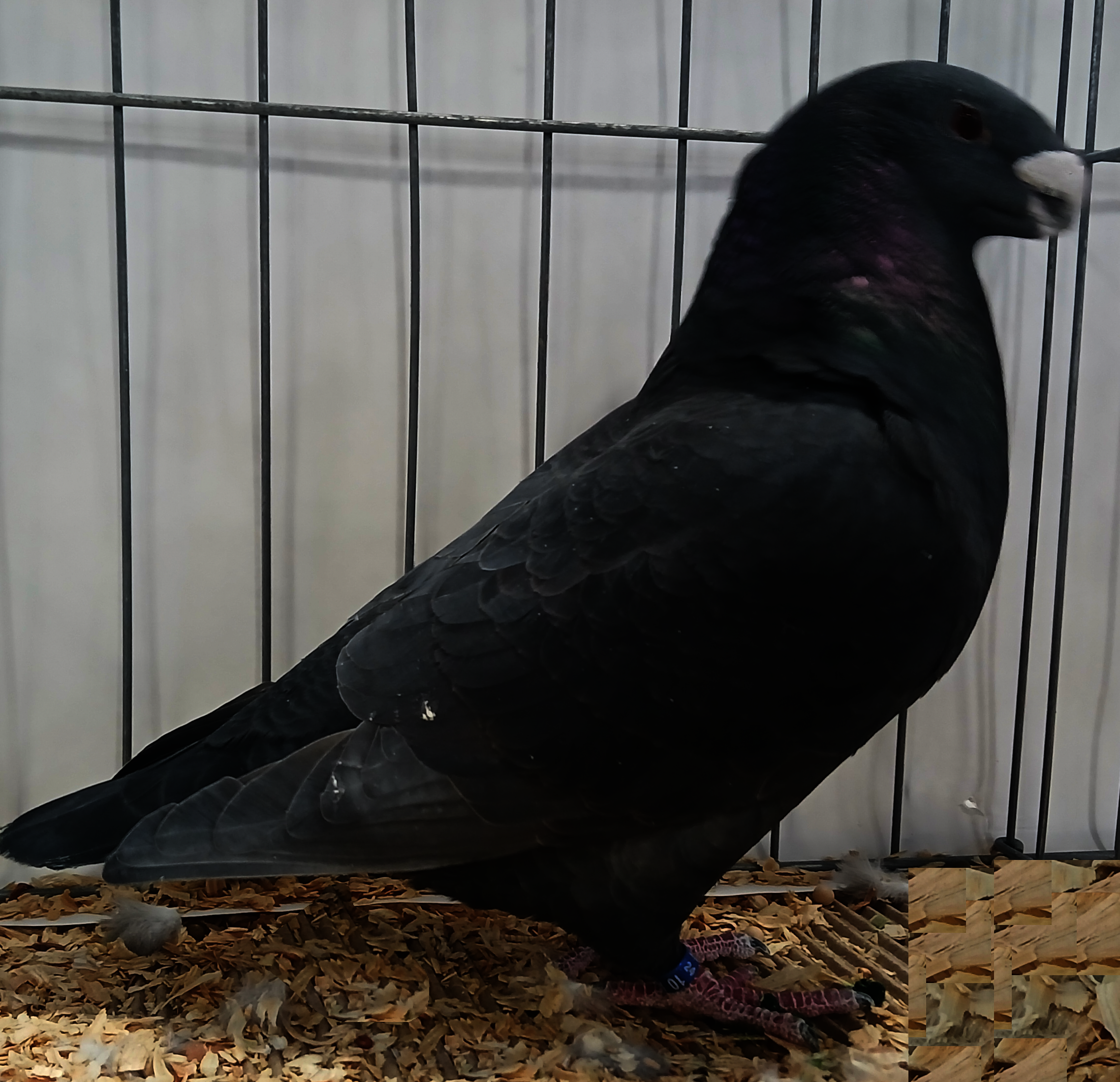
American Show Racer Black

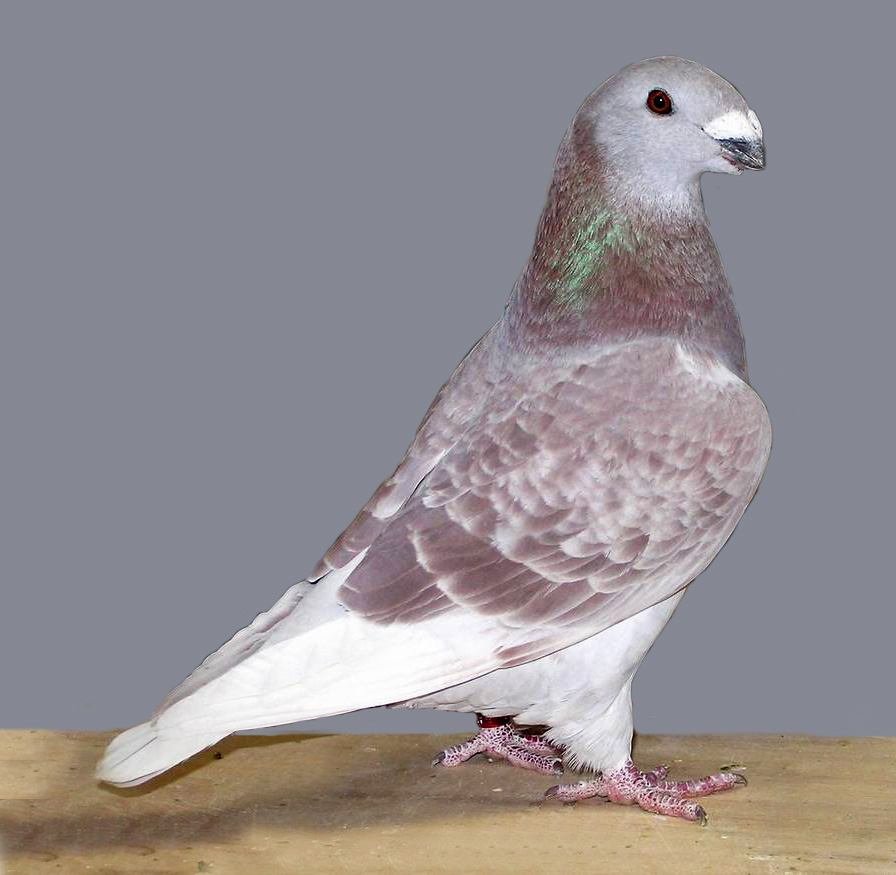
Show pen Homer Red check

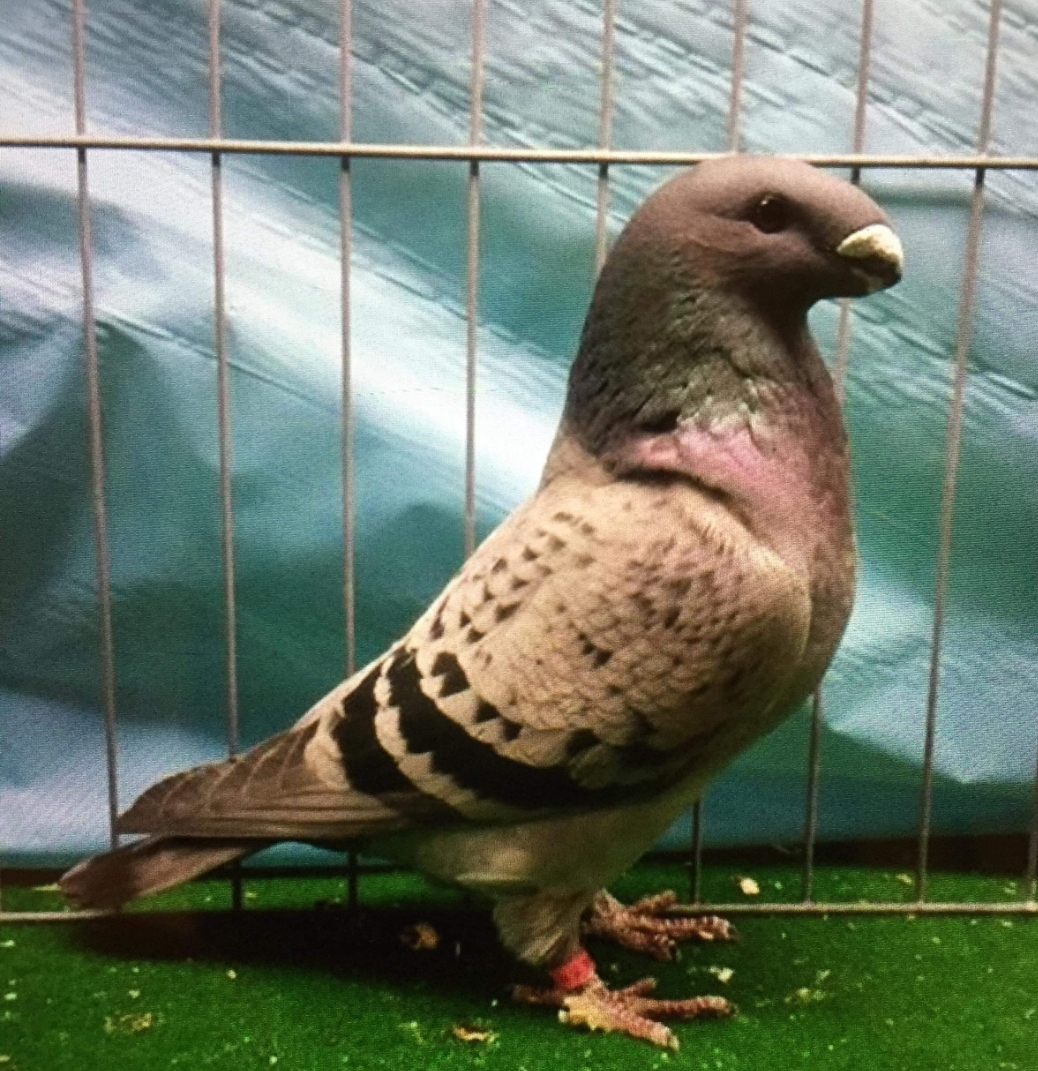
Show Racer Blue check
- Shumen Tumbler (BG/997)
- Siberian Tumbler (RUS^{(D)}/962)
- Silesian Colour-head (CZ/064)
- Silesian Cropper (D/323)
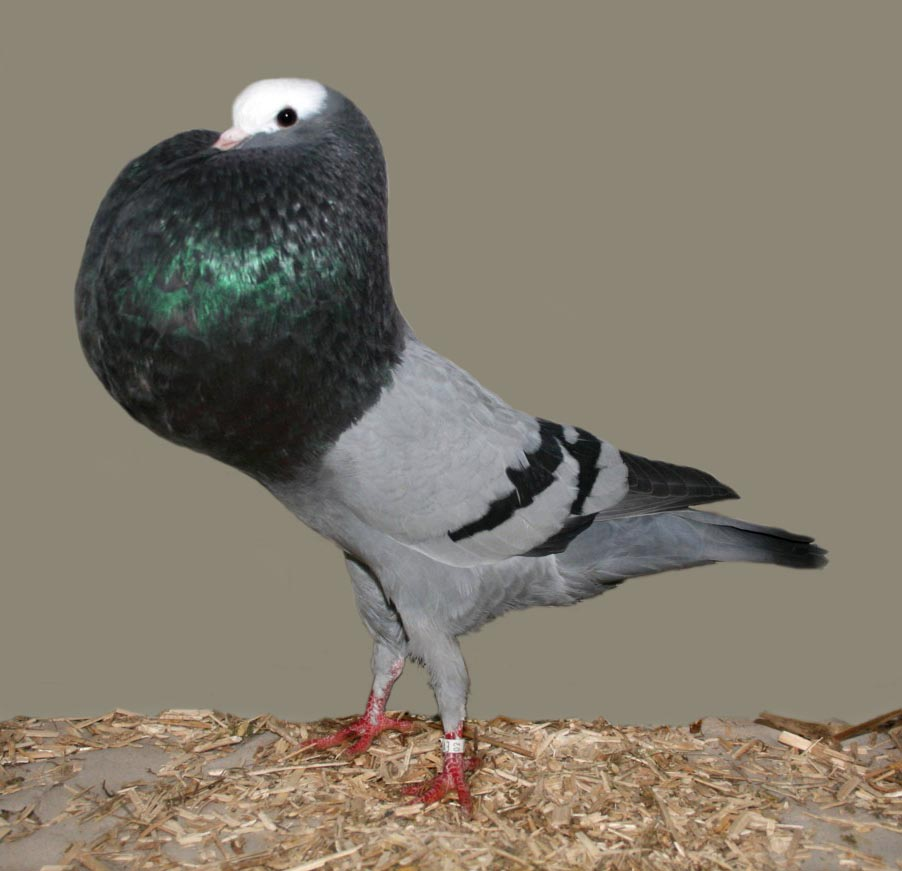
Silesian Cropper
- Silesian Moorhead (D/480)
- Silesian White-head
- Silky Fantail
- Single-crested Priest
- Sisak Roller (HR/938)(Croatian: Sisački prevrtač)
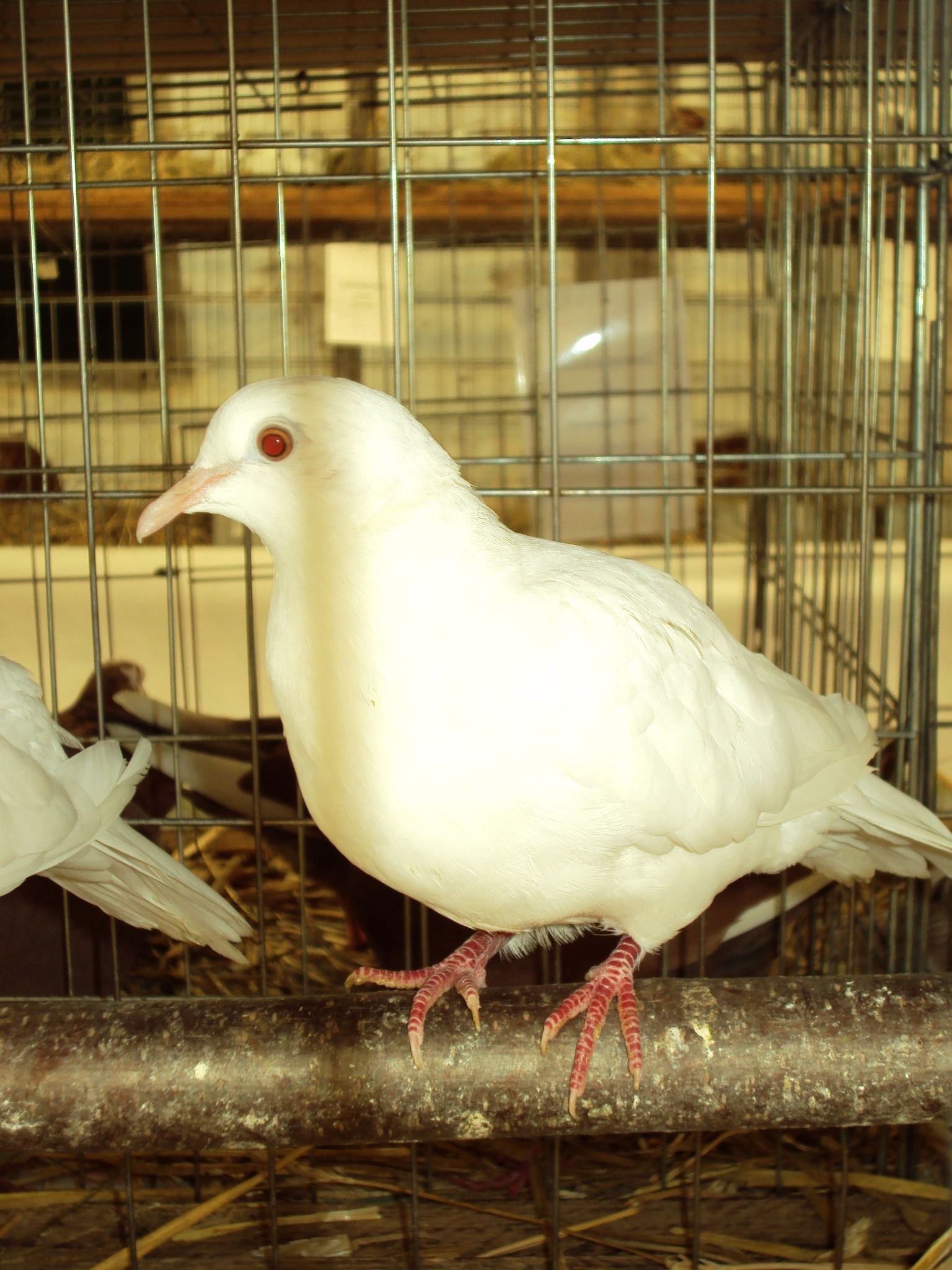
Sisak Roller
- Sivas Kumru Güvercin
- Slovakian Cropper (SK^{(D)}/322)
- Slovakian Highflyer (SK/932)
- Slowenien White-head (SLO/060)
- Smyter (B/053)
- Sobji (Bangladeshi High Flyer and racing breed)
- Sobuj neck Bangladeshi High Flyer Pigeons
- Sofia Tumbler (BG/998)
- Sombor (= Bácka Long-beaked Tumbler (SRB^{(D)}/859))
- Sottobanca (= Italian Sottobanca (I/019))
  - Sottobanca, French type (F/020)
- South Batschka Tumbler (H/941) (Hungarian: Dél-Bacskai keringö)
- South German Blasse (D/435)
- South German Breast (D/440) (German: Süddeutsche Latztaube
- South German Charcoal Lark pigeon (D/432)
- South German Monk (muffed (D/436) and clean-legged (D/437))
- South German Moorhead (D/439)
- South German Shield (D/438)
- South German Spot (D/441) (German: Süddeutsche Schnippe)
- South German Tiger-head (D/433) (German: Süddeutscher Tigermohr)
- South German White-tail (D/434)
- Spanish Bagdad
- Spanish Barb
- Spanish Flamenca (E/113)
- Spanish Flamenca Runt
- Spanish Frillback Bagadette
- Spanish Gabacho Runt
- Spanish Little Friar Tumbler
- Spanish Mondain
- Spanish Monjin
- Spanish Naked-neck
- Spanish Nun
- Spanish Owl pigeon
- Spanish Owl Pouter
- Spanish Pigeon (D/046)
- Spanish Strawberry Eye (E/118) (Spanish: Ojo de Fresa)
- Spanish Thief Pouter
- Spangeled Magpie Purzler of Satu-Mare
- Speelderke (B/1101)
- Srebrniak (Perlovy)
- Stapar Tumbler (SRB^{(D)}/890)
- Stargard Shaker (D/818) (German: Stargarder Zitterhals)
- Starling pigeon (D/405)
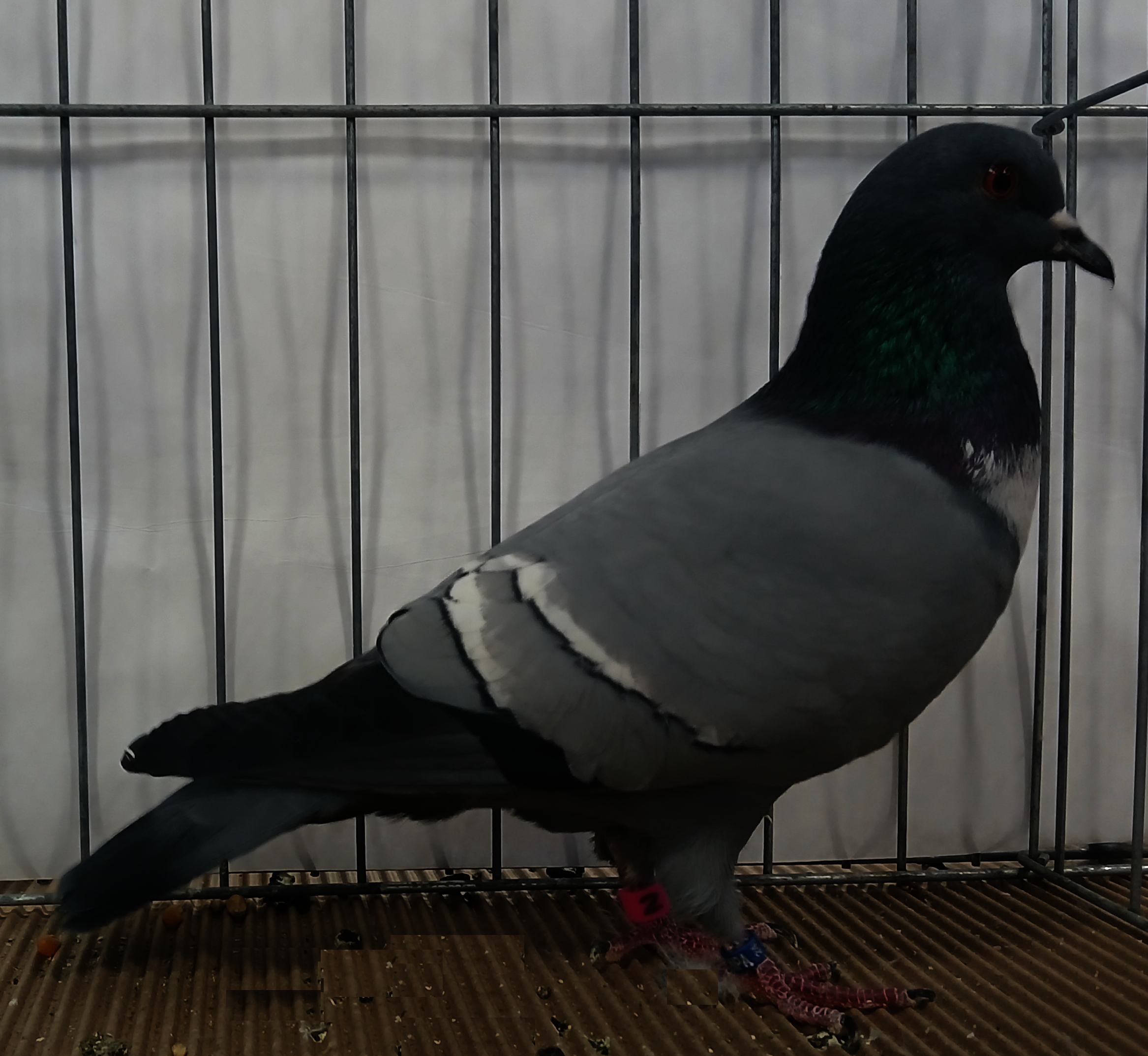
Starling

Starwitzer Cropper (D/320)[1]

- Steinheim Bagdad (D/108)
- Steller Cropper (D/319)
- Stettin Tumbler (D/912)
- Steiger Cropper (D/318)
- Stork Pigeon de Lodz (PL/809)
- Stralsund Highflyer (D/804)
- Strasser pigeon (D/023)
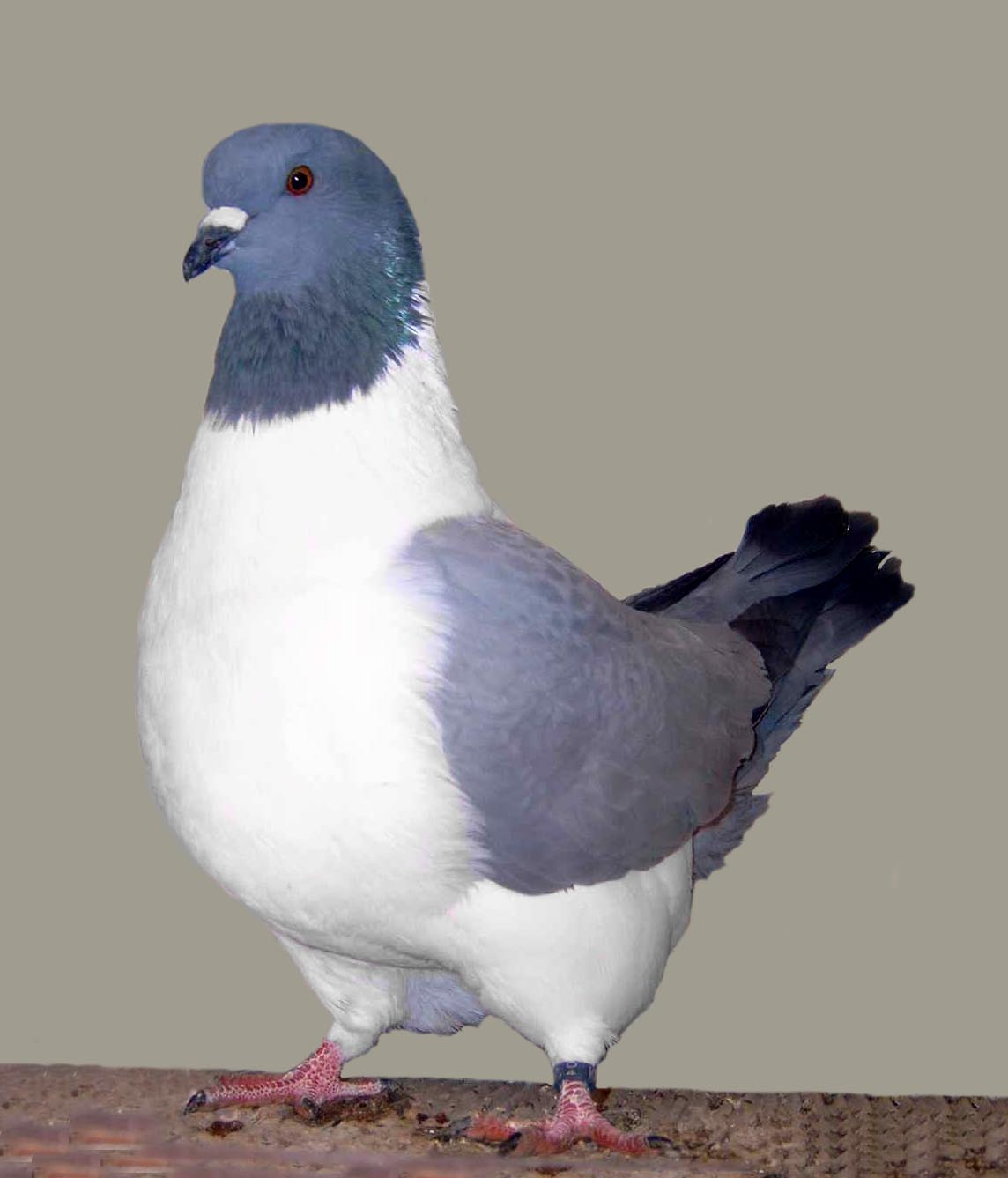
Strasser
- Sverdlovsk blue-gray mottle-headed pigeon
- Swallow pigeon
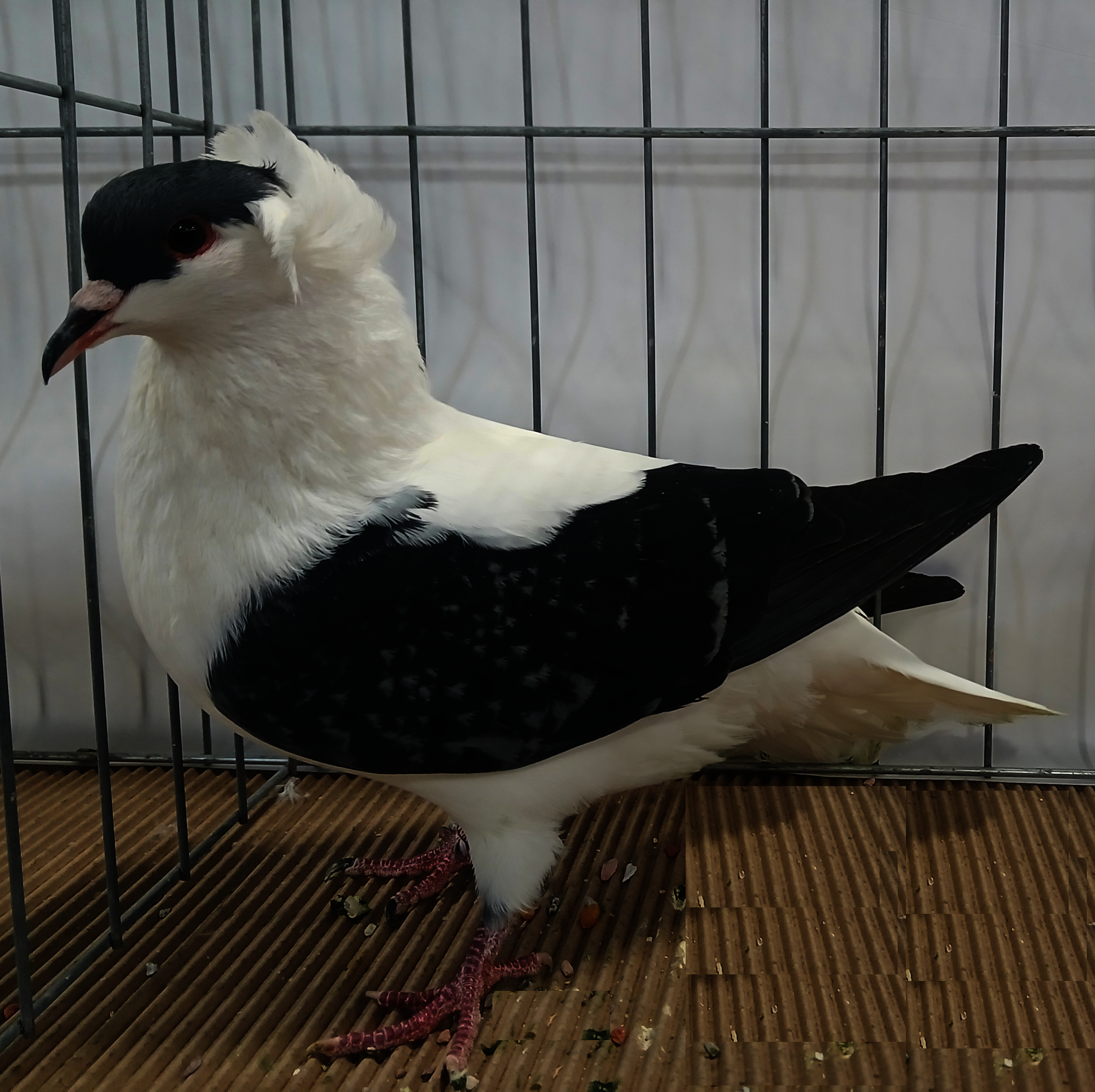
Swallow Pigeon Checked

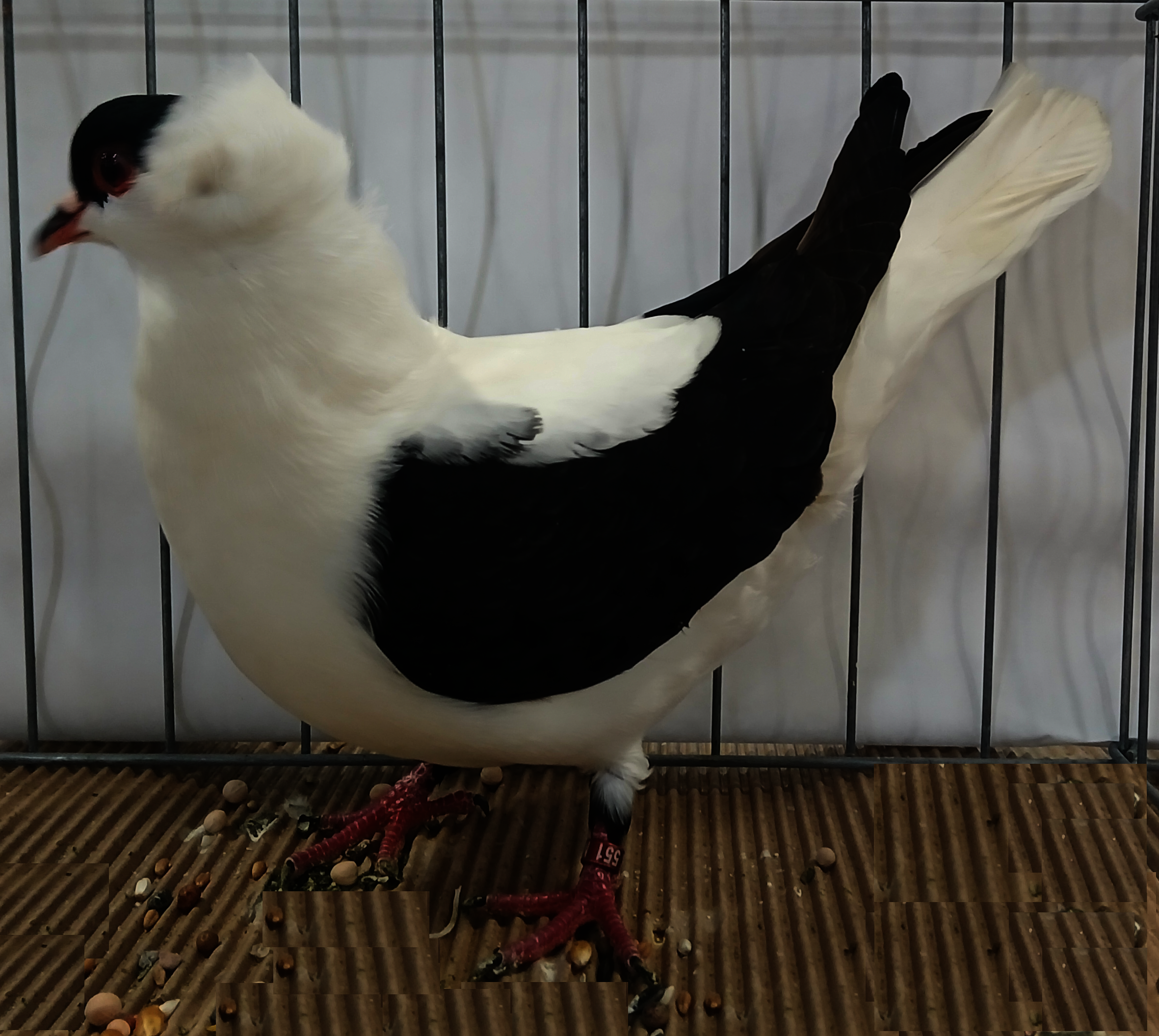
Swallow Pigeon Black
- Swedish Owl pigeon (S/720)
- Swedish Tumbler (S/881)
- Swing Pouter (Stavak Pouter, Steller Pouter)
- Swiss Crescent
- Swiss Mondain
- Swiss Pouter (CH/348)
- Swiss Self (CH/416)
- Syrian Bagdad
- Syrian Coop Tumbler
- Syrian Curled Dewlap (F/040)
- Syrian Dewlap (GB/039)
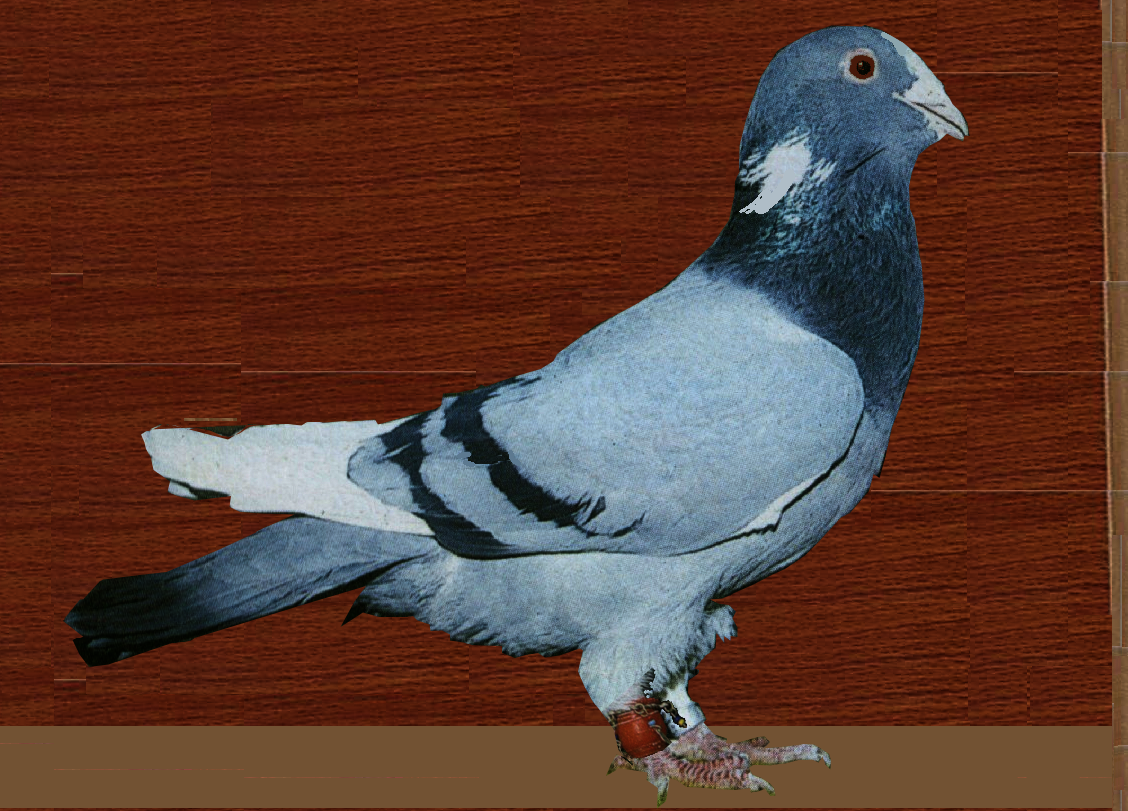
- Syrian Fantail
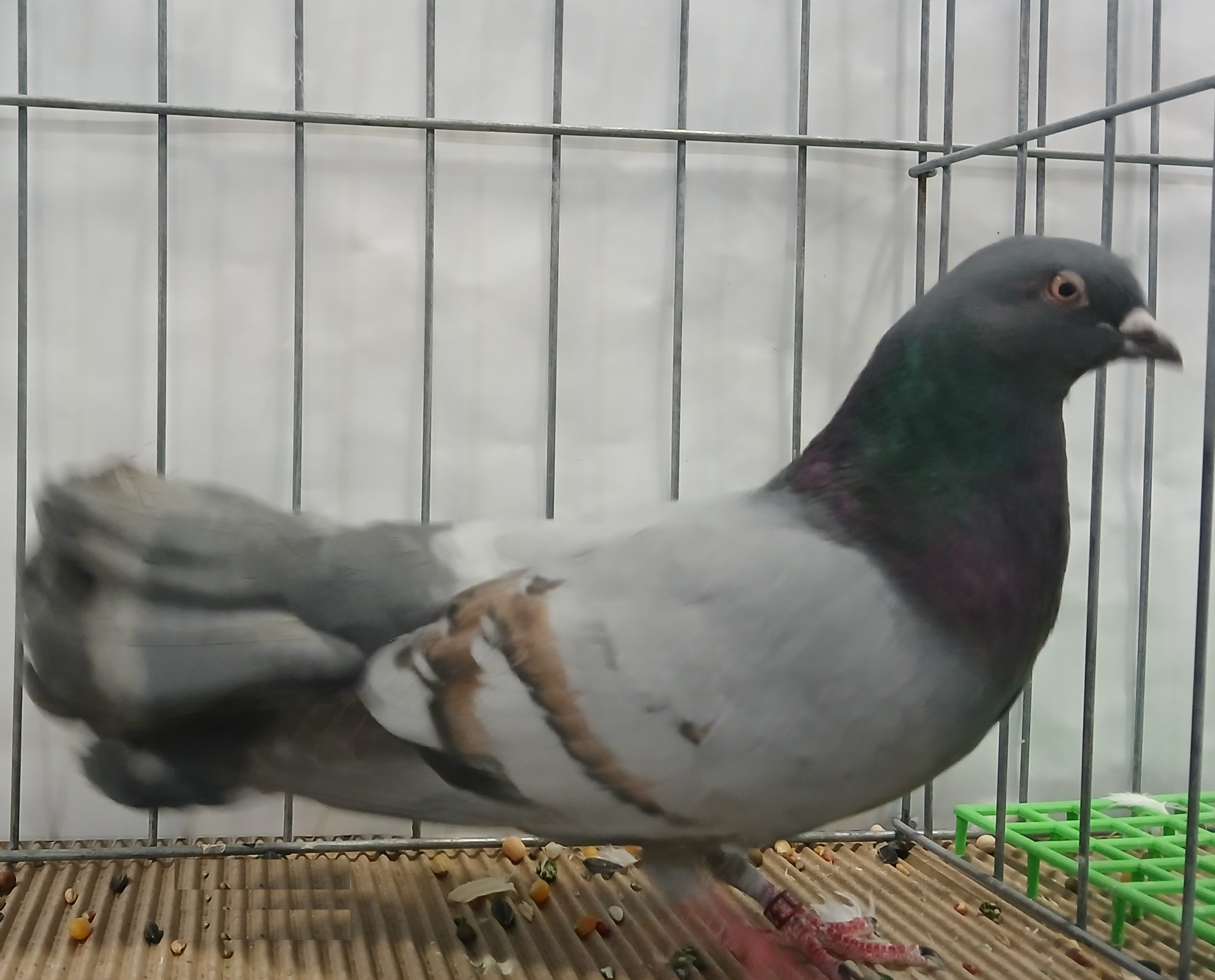
Syrain Fantail
- Syrian Frillback
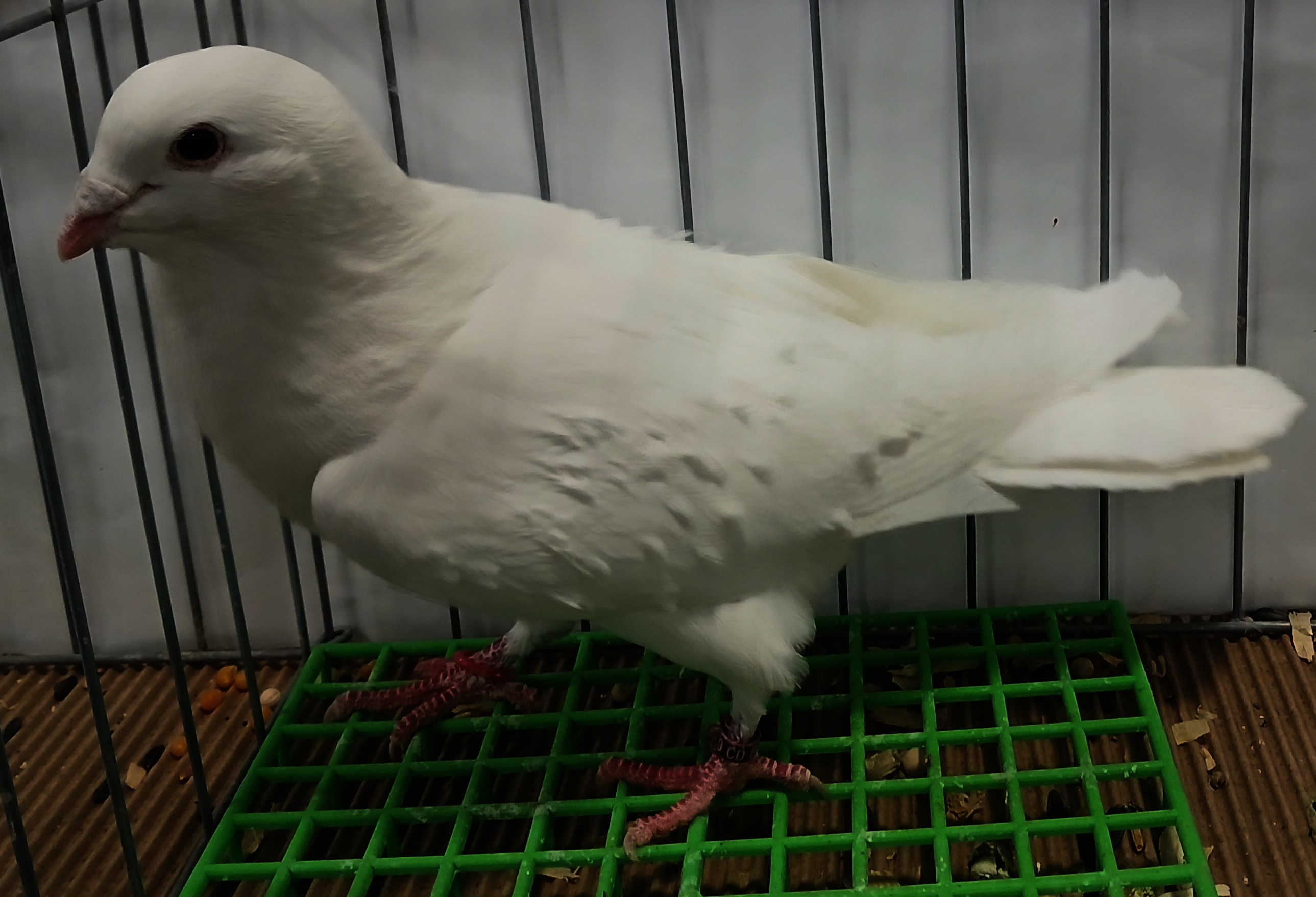
Syrain Frillback

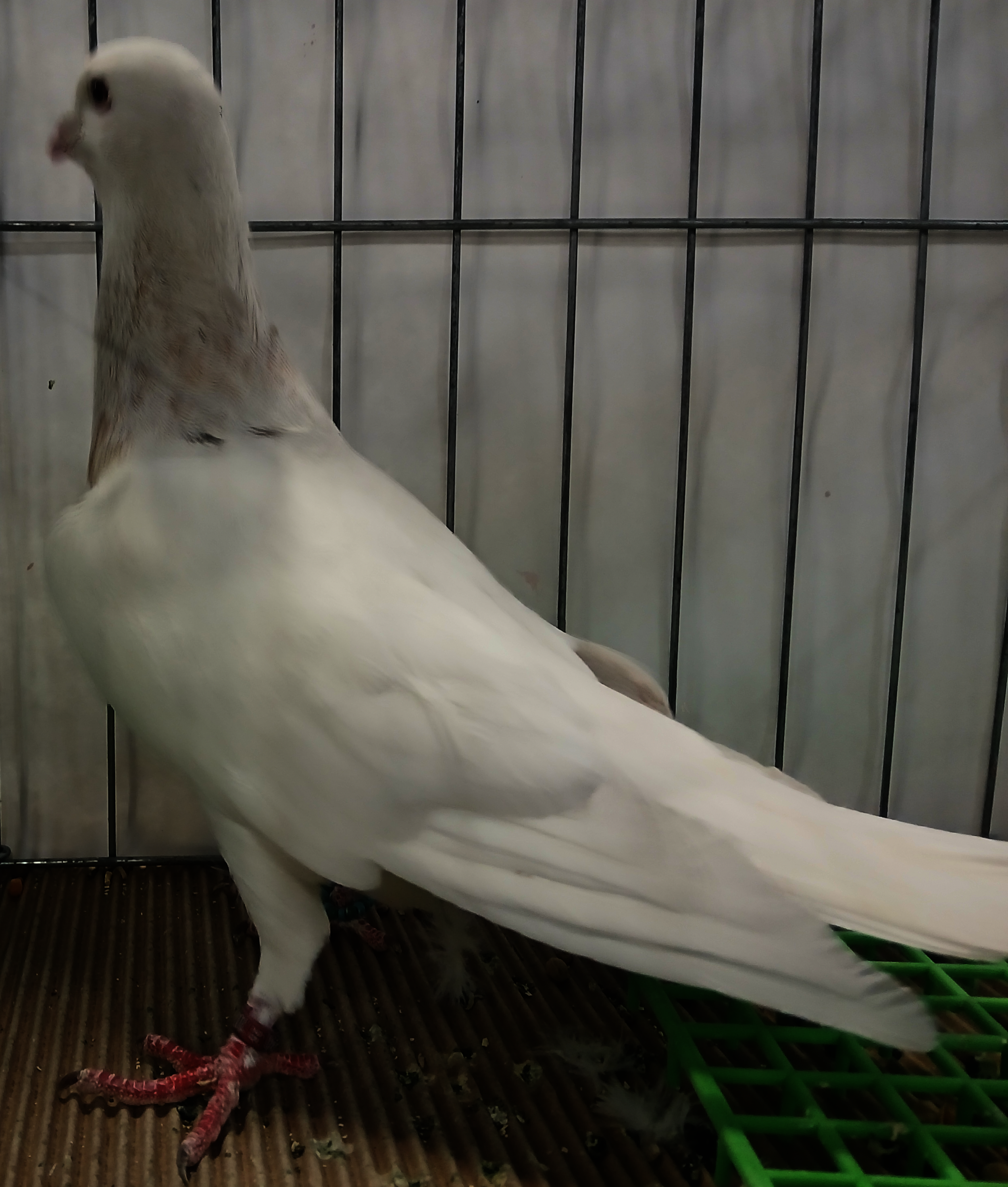
Syrain Frillback
- Syrian Halabi
- Syrian Sabuni Tumbler
- Syrian Swift pigeon (GB/044)
- Syrian Turbiteen (= Barbarisi Owl pigeon (SYR^{(D)}/725))
- Szegedin Highflyer (H/861)
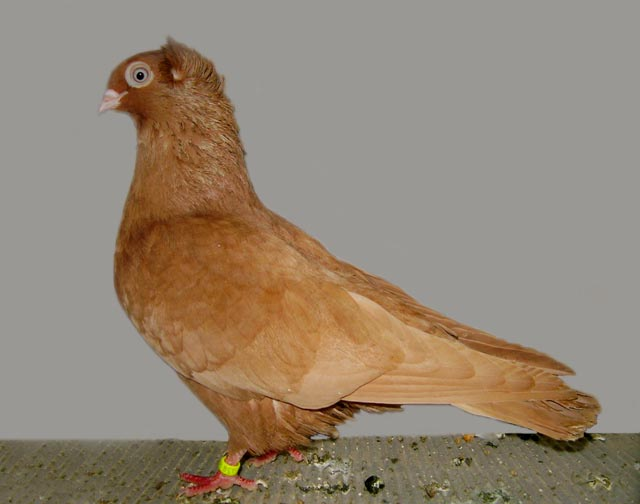
Szegediner Highflier
- Szekesfehervar Tumbler (H/942)
- Szolnok Bagdad (H/115)
- Szolnok Tumbler (H/940)
- Safchila
- Shuwa Chondon

== T ==
- Taganrog Tumbler (RUS(D)/867)
- Takla Tumbler
- Taqlaji
- Targovist Tumbler (BG/999)
- Targovista red Highflyer (RO/1005)
- Texan Pioneer (ESKT/012)
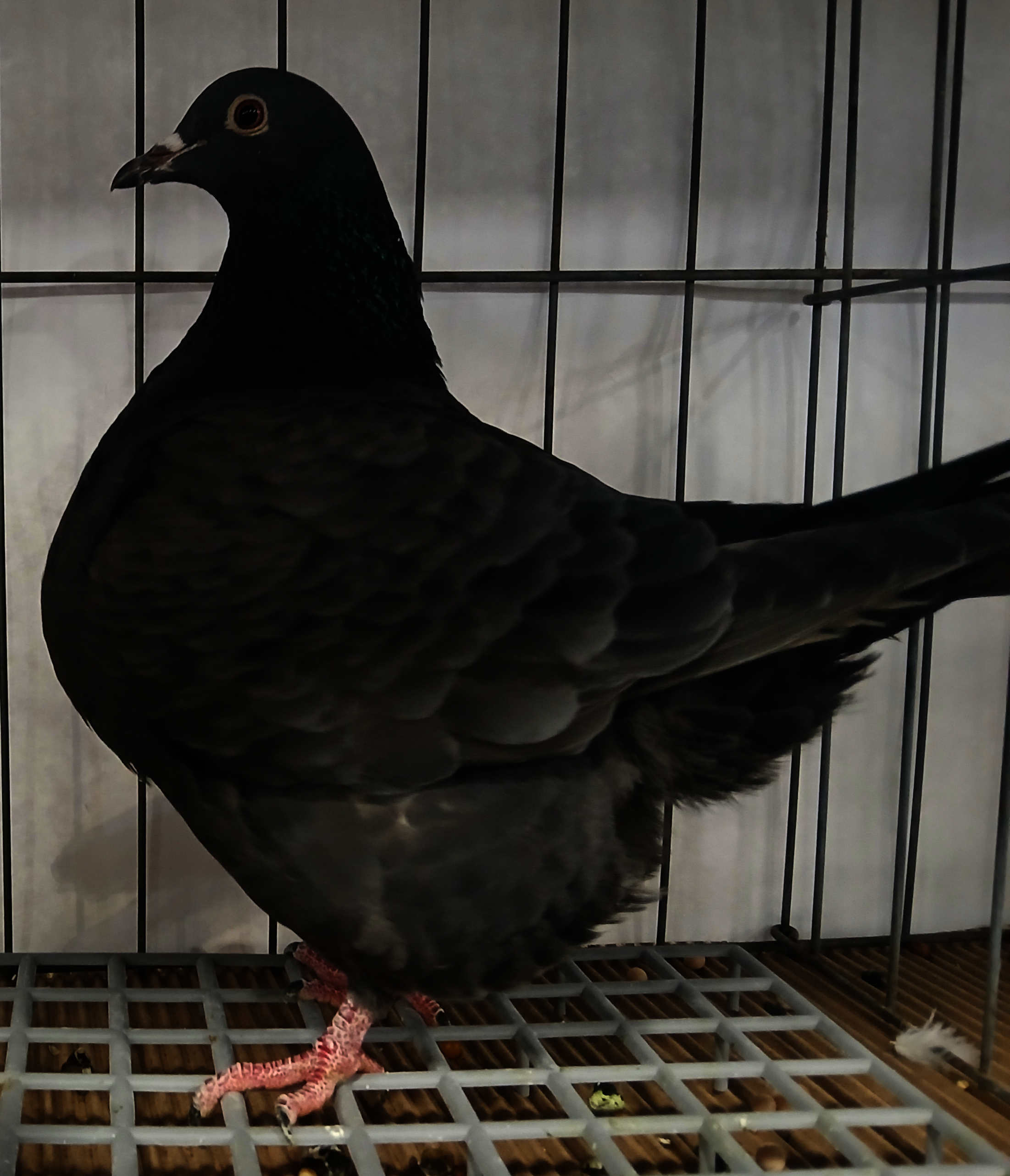
Texan Pioneer
- Thai Fantail
- Thai Laugher
- Thurgau Crescent (CH/425)
- Thurgau Elmer (CH/424)
- Thurgau Monk (CH/426)
- Thurgau Peak-crested
- Thurgau Shield (CH/427)
- Thurgau White-tail (CH/428)
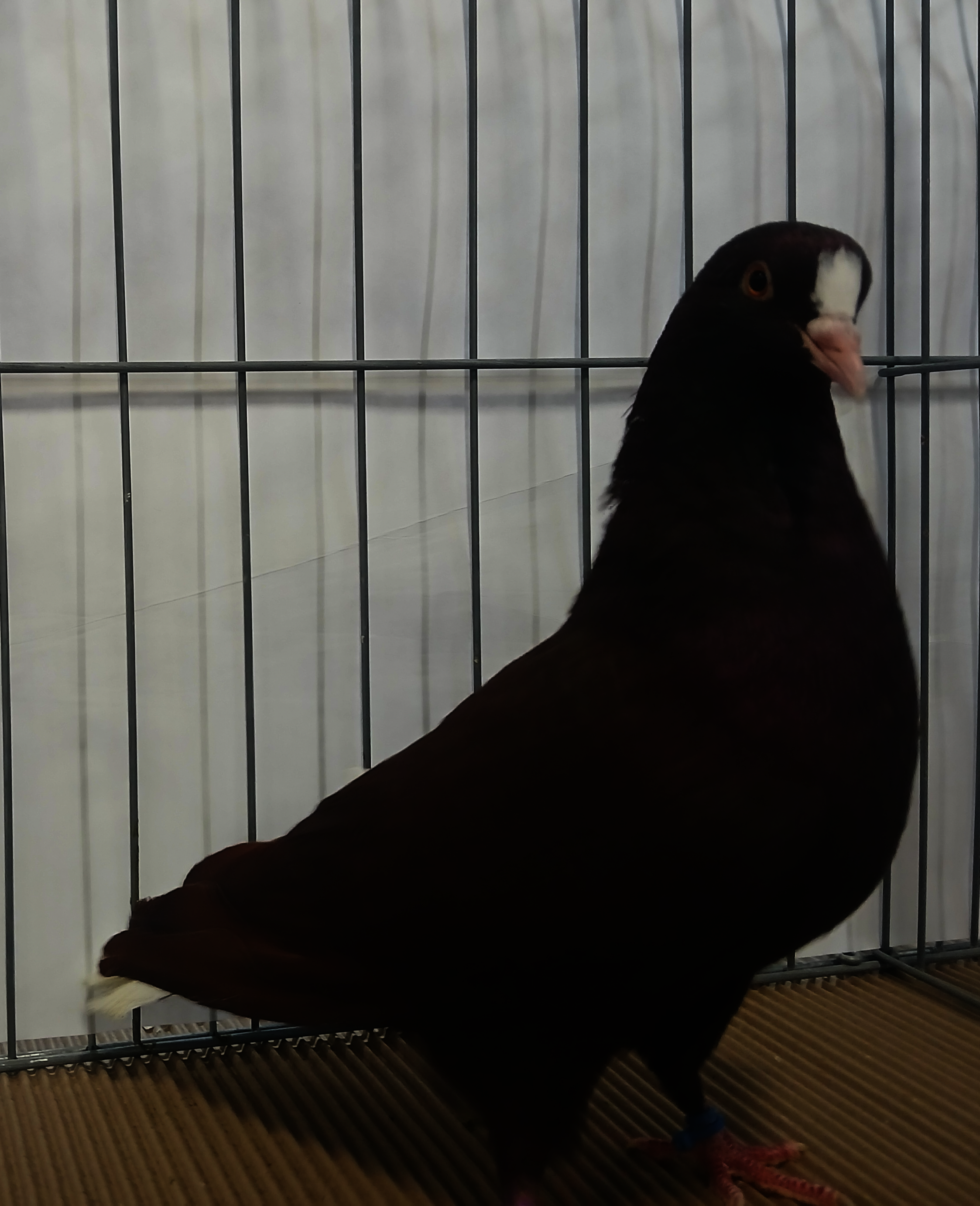
Thurgingian White Tail
- Thuringian Breast (D/461)
- Thuringian Colour pigeons, a group of pigeon breeds
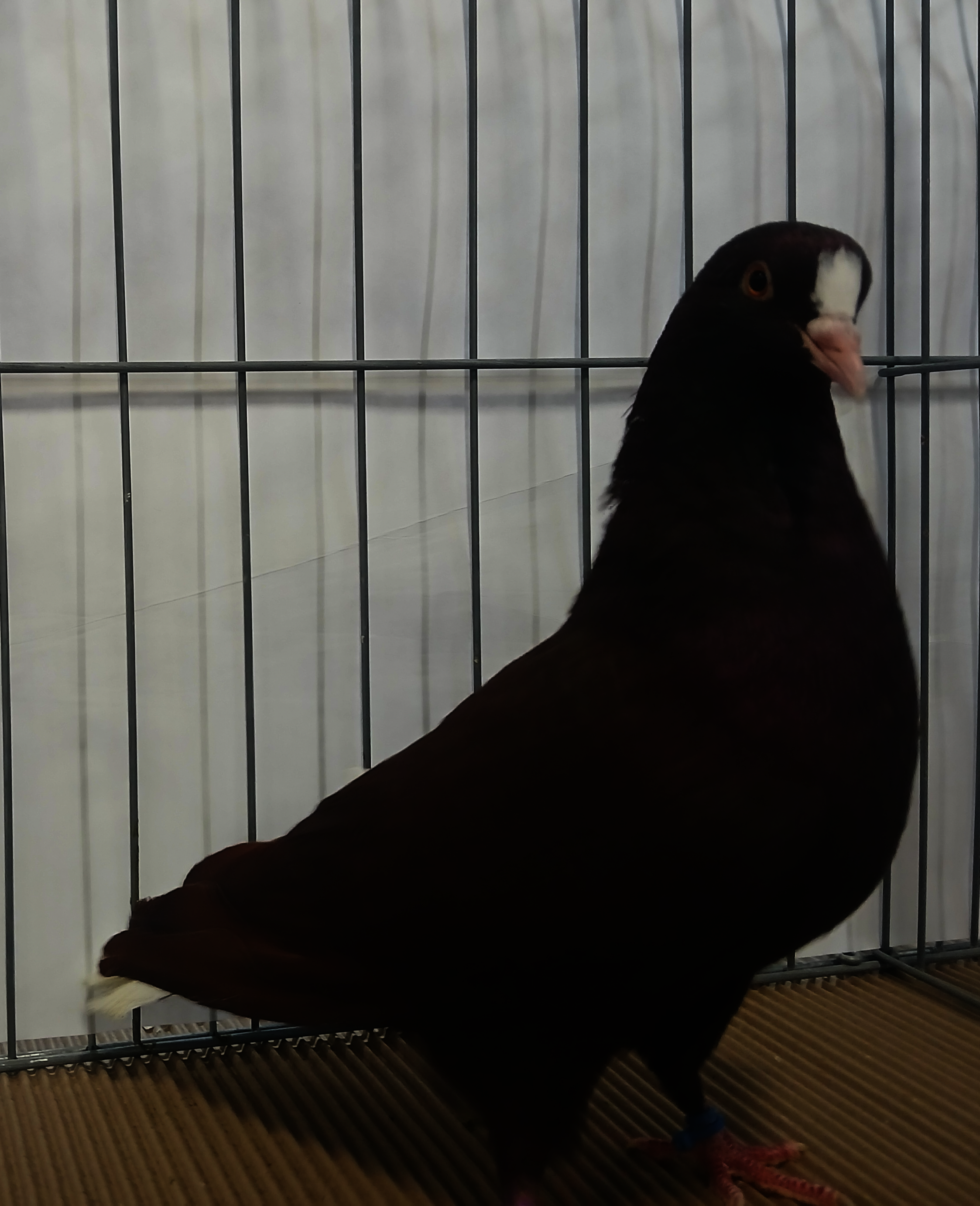
Thurgingian White Tail
- Thuringian Crescent Pigeon (D/463)
- Thuringian Cropper (D/324)
- Thuringian Goldbeetle (D/451)
- Thuringian Mauser Pigeon (D/453)
- Thuringian Monk (D/462)
- Thuringian Pouter (= Thuringian Cropper (D/324))
- Thuringian Self (D/450)
- Thuringian Shield Pigeon (D/459)
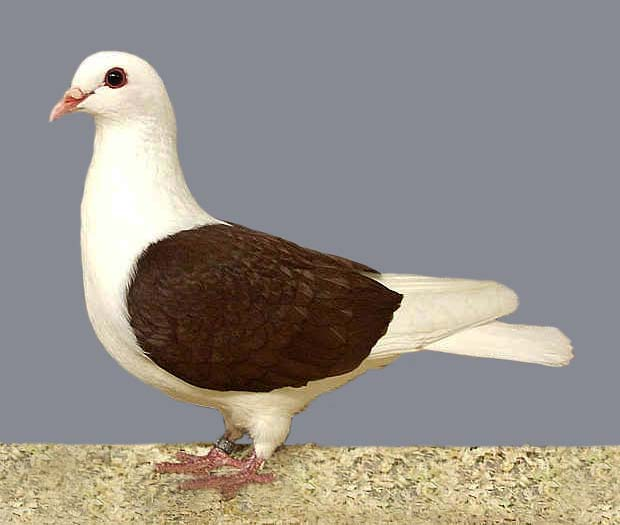
Thuringian Red
- Thuringian Spot (D/460)
- Thuringian Stork Pigeon (D/457)
- Thuringian Swallow pigeon (D/456)
- Thuringian White Bib (D/455)
- Thuringian White-head (D/454)
- Thuringian White-tail (D/452)
- Thuringian Wing Pigeon (D/458)
- Tiger Swallow pigeon (→ Bohemian Tiger Swallow, muffed (CZ/477) and Bohemian Tiger Swallow, clean-legged (CZ/478))
- Tippler
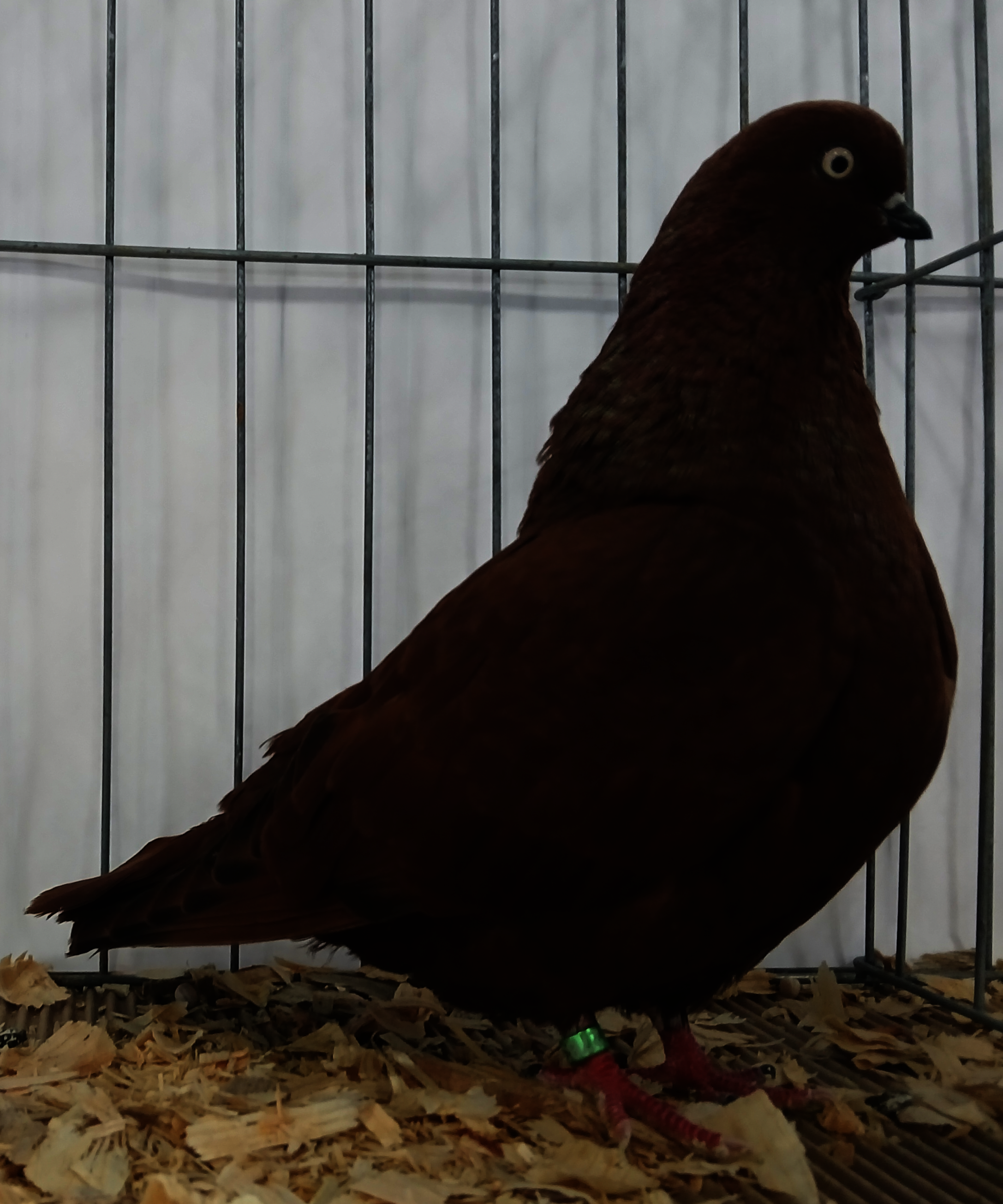
Tippler
- Timișoara Tumbler (RO^{(D)}/856)
- Tokur
- Transylvanian Back-crested Tumbler
- Transylvanian Double-crested Tumbler (RO^{(D)}/863)
- Transylvanian Tumbler (without any crest)
- Travnik Highflyer (BiH/946)
- Trenton
- Triganino Modena (I/207)
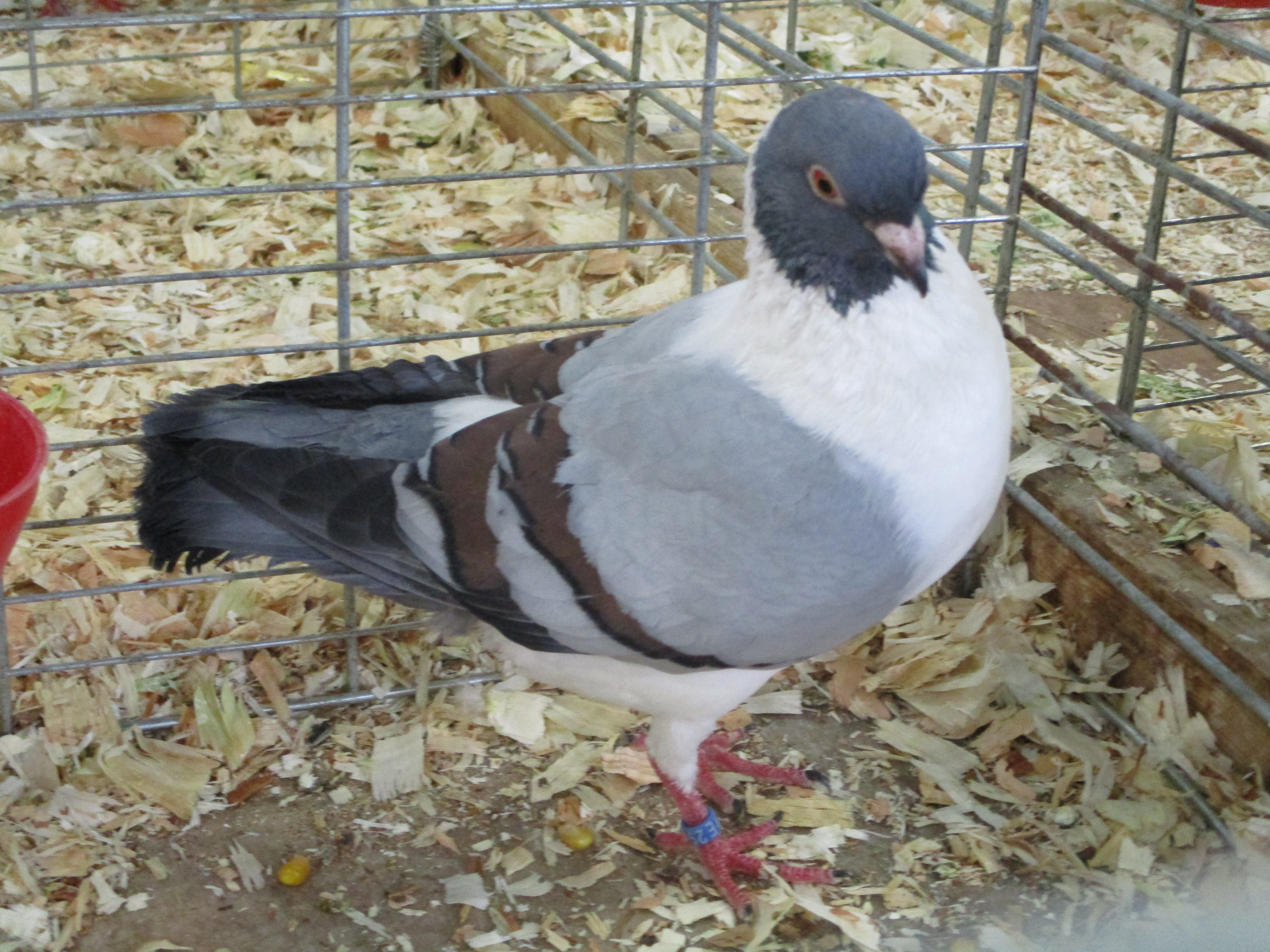
Triganio Modena Gazzi Blue Bar

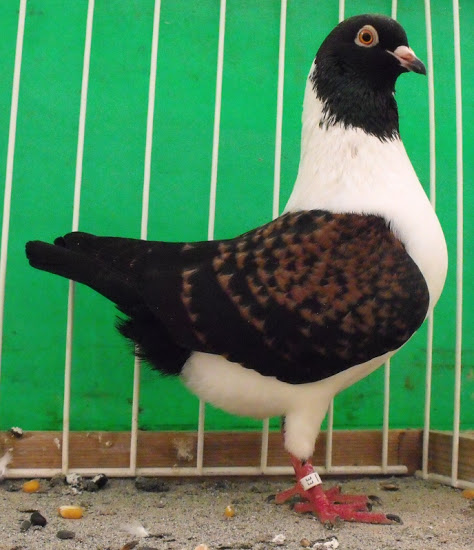
Triganino Modena Gazzi
- Tula Ribbon-tail Tumbler (RUS (D)/865)
- Tumbler Pigeons
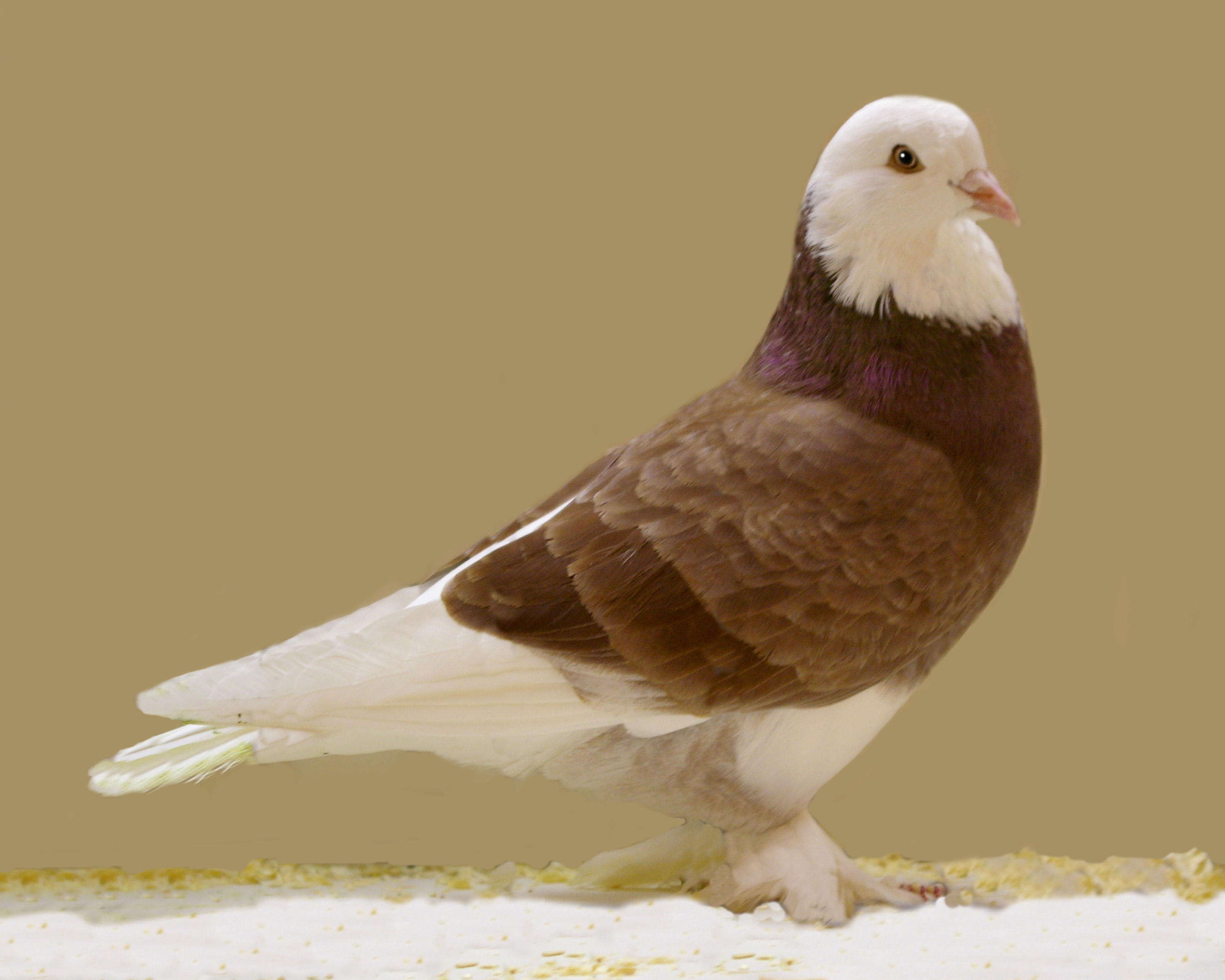
West of England Tumbler

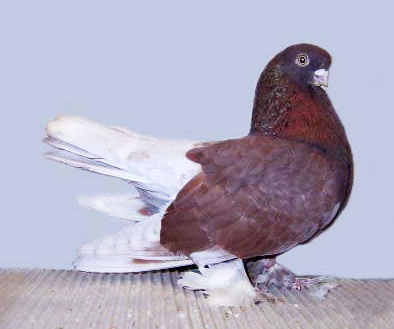
Kasaner Tumbler

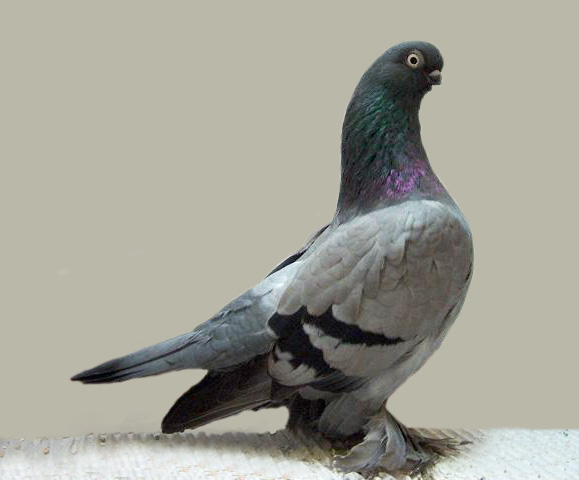
Berlin Short Faced Tumbler

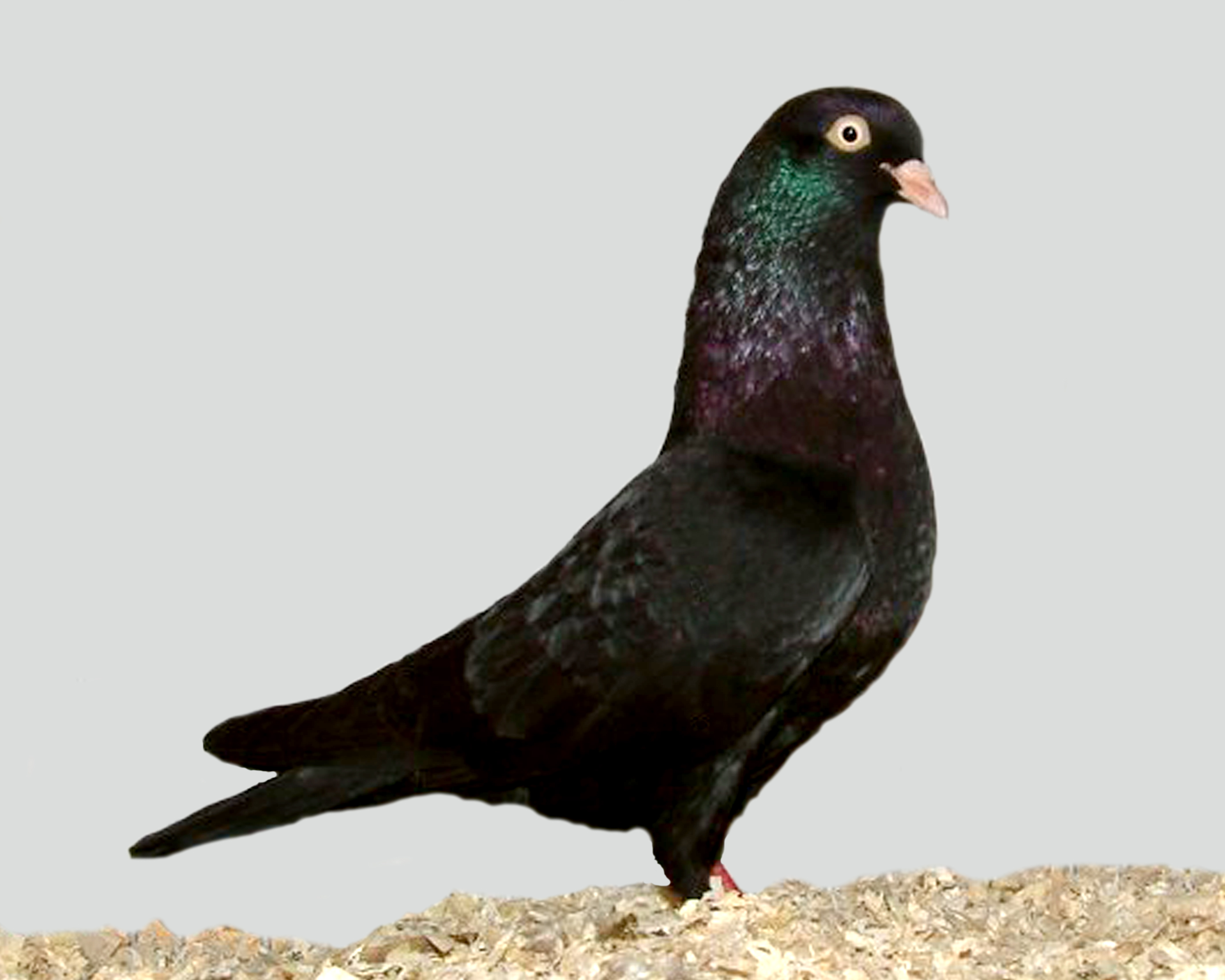
Belgian Tumbler

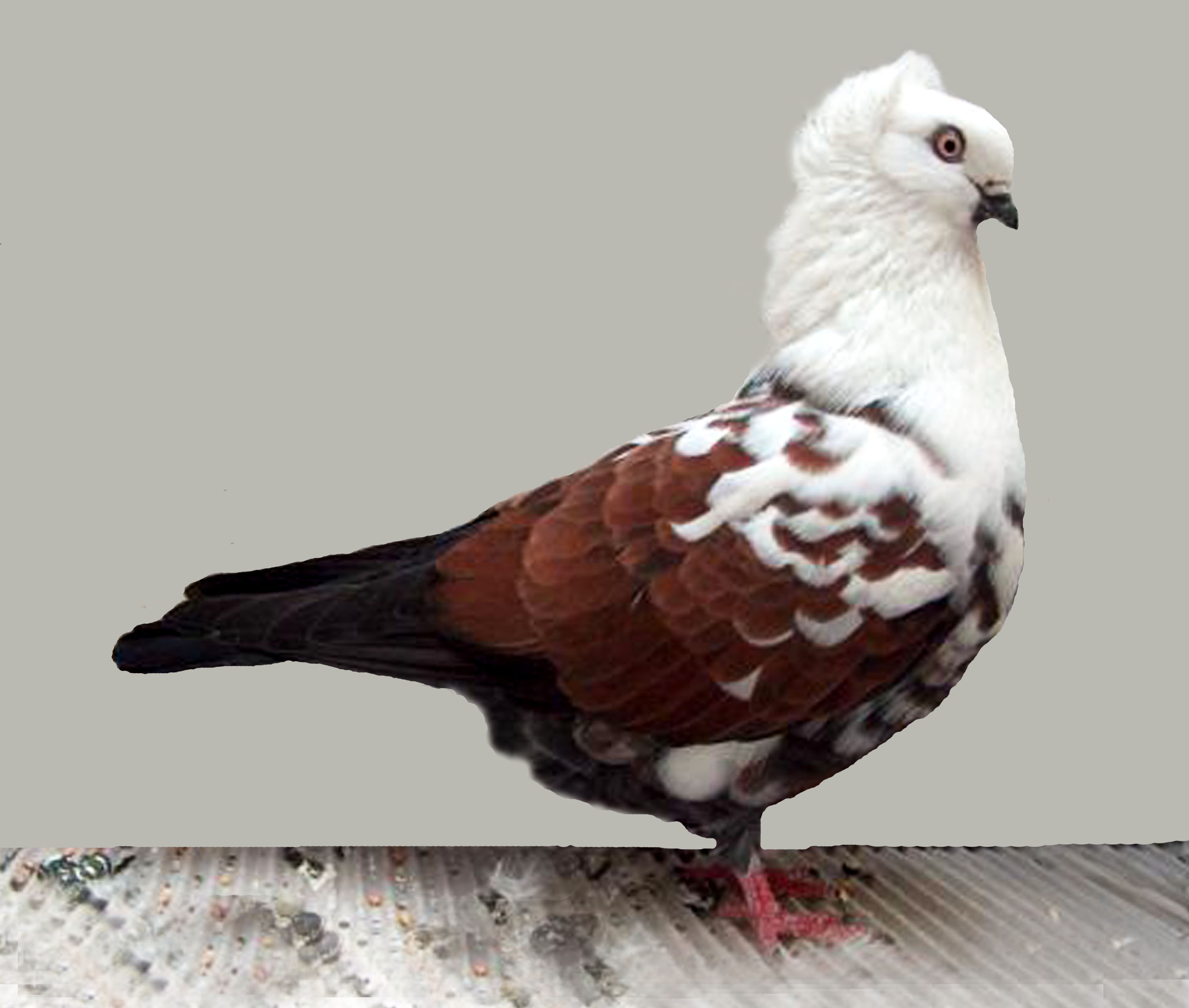
Timisoara Tumbler

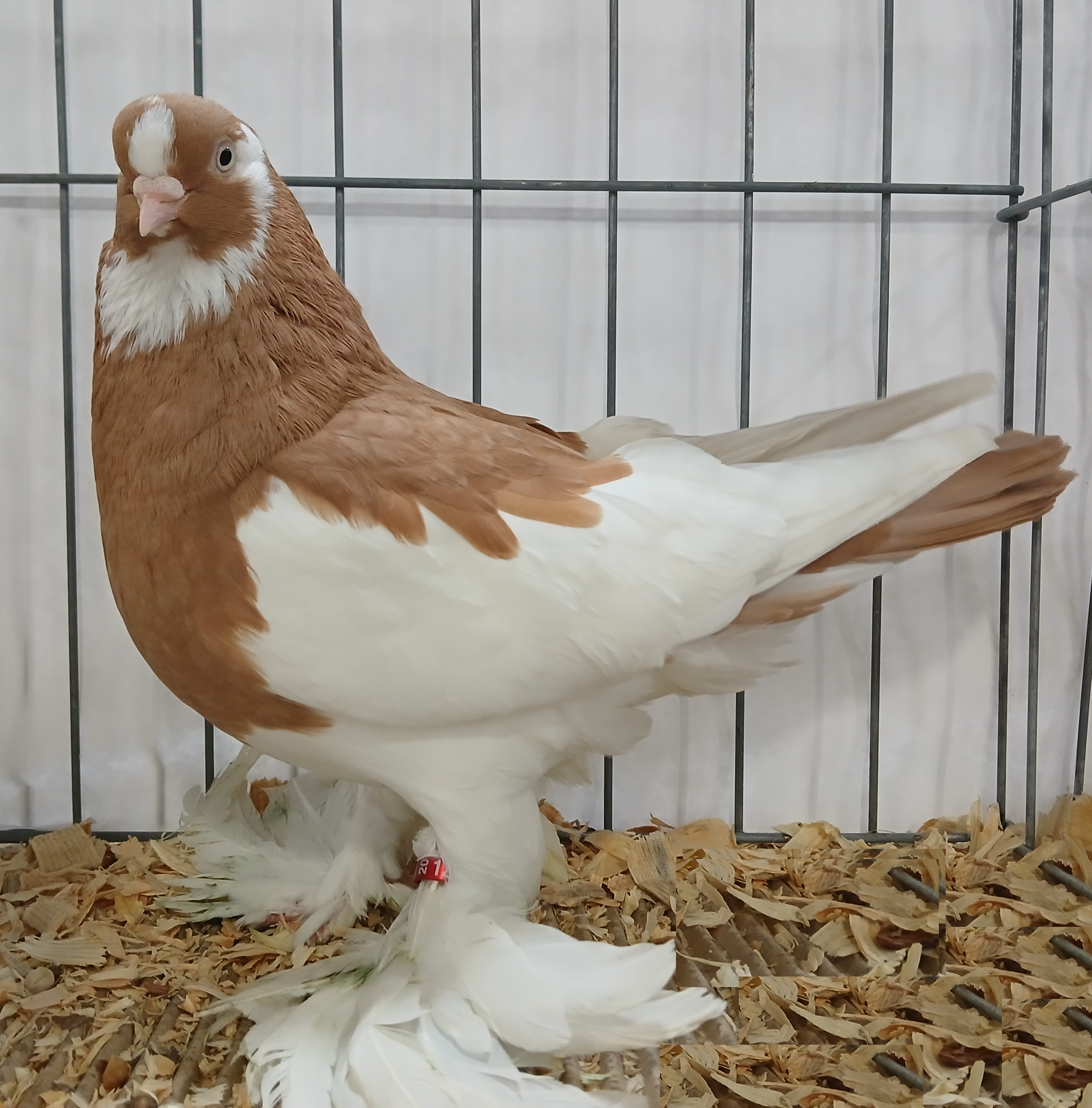
Old Style Muffed Tumbler

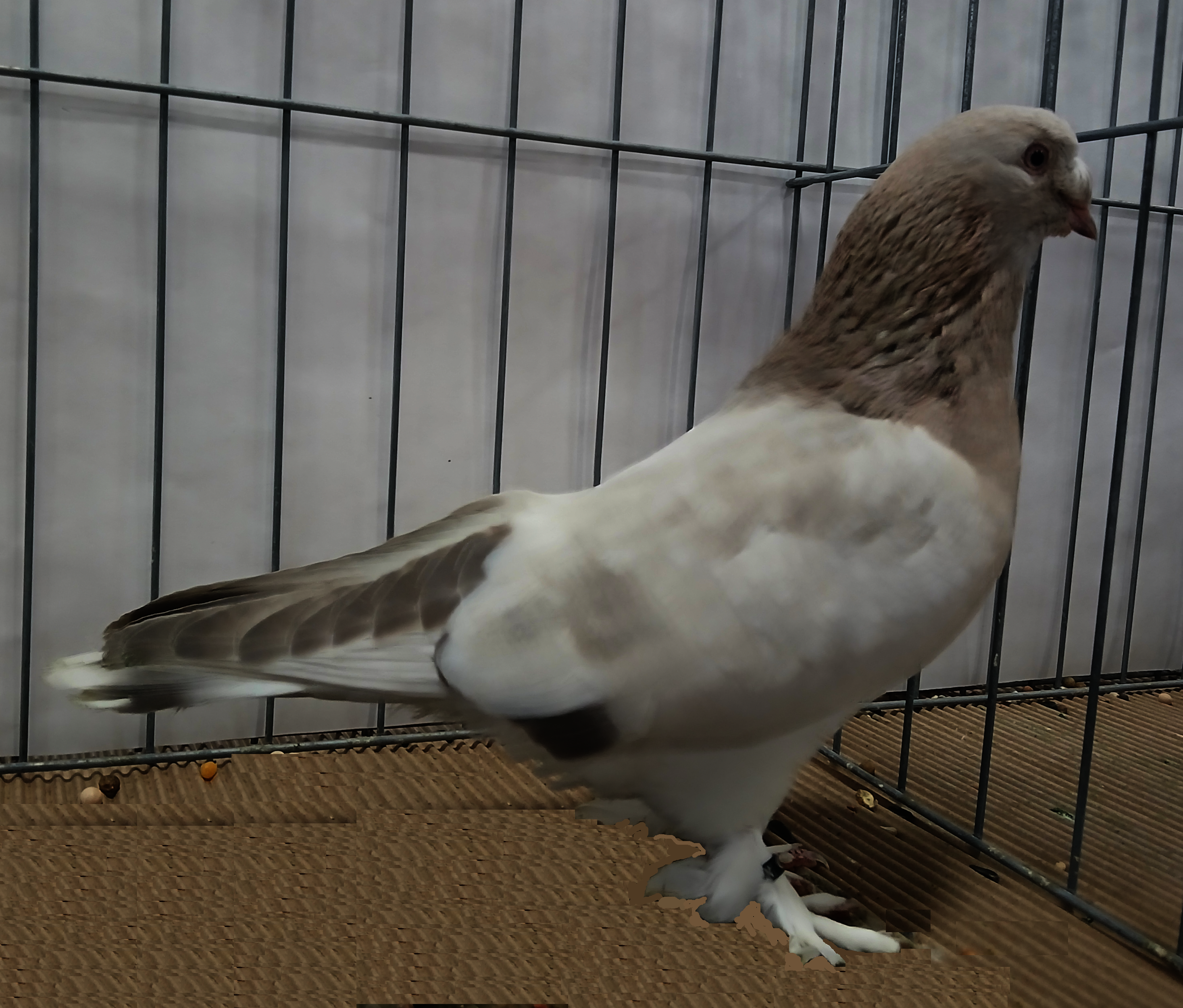
Turkish Tumbler
- Tunesian Owl pigeon (F/721)
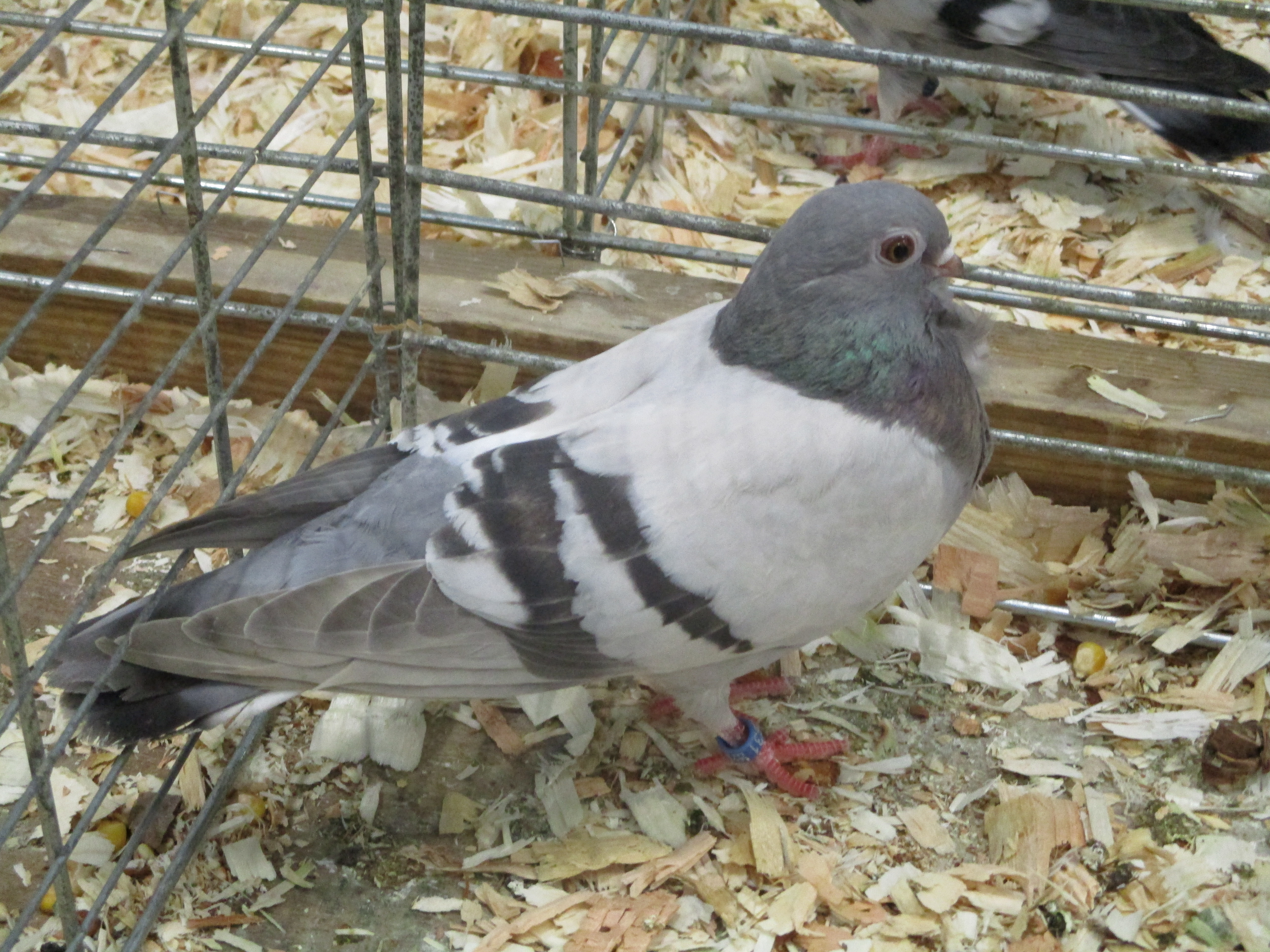
Tunisian Owl
- Tung Koon Paak
- Turbit (GB/711)
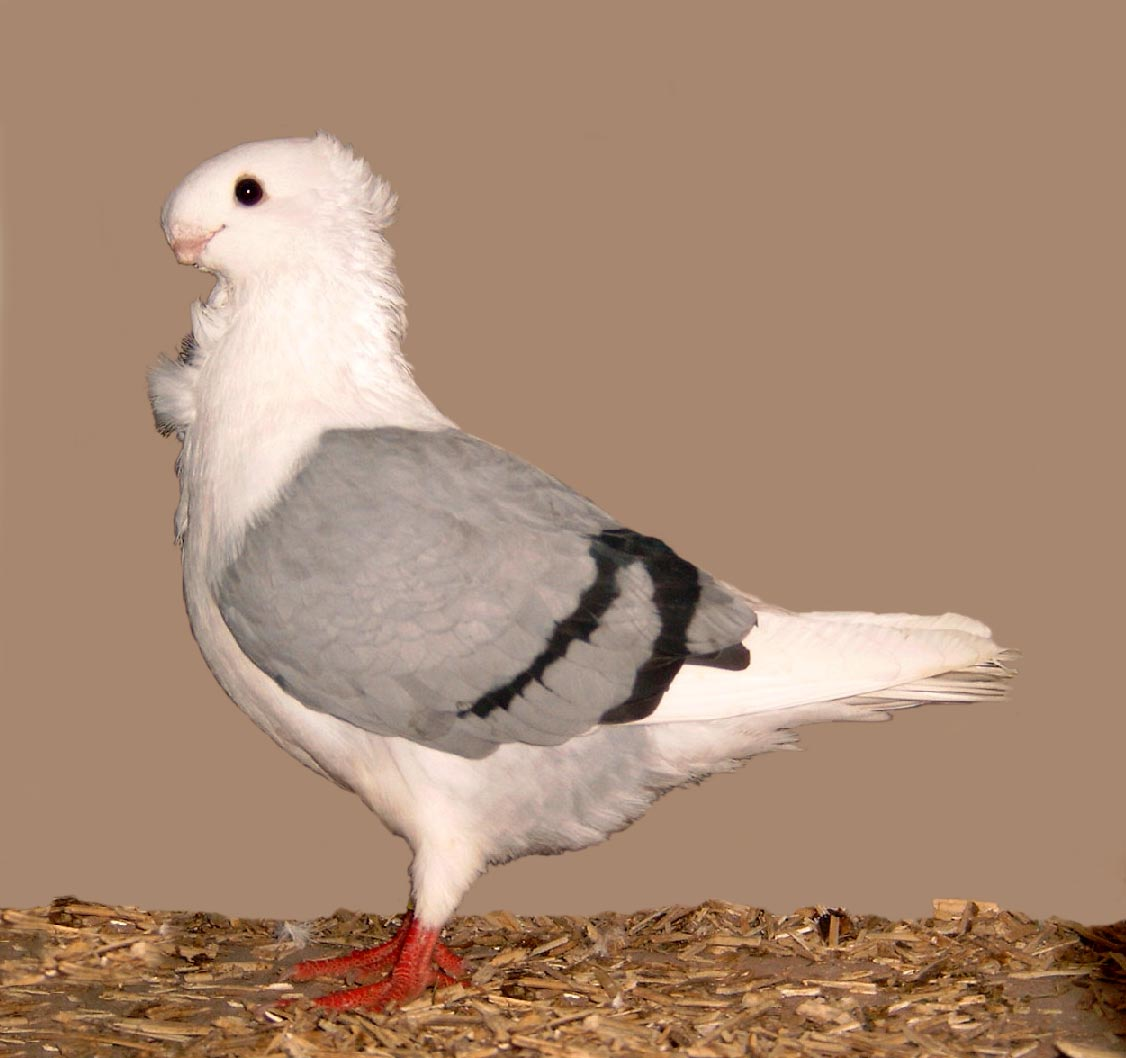
Turbit blue bar
- Turbiteen (GB/716)

== U ==
- Ural striped maned pigeon
- Usbekian Tumbler (RUS(D)/892)
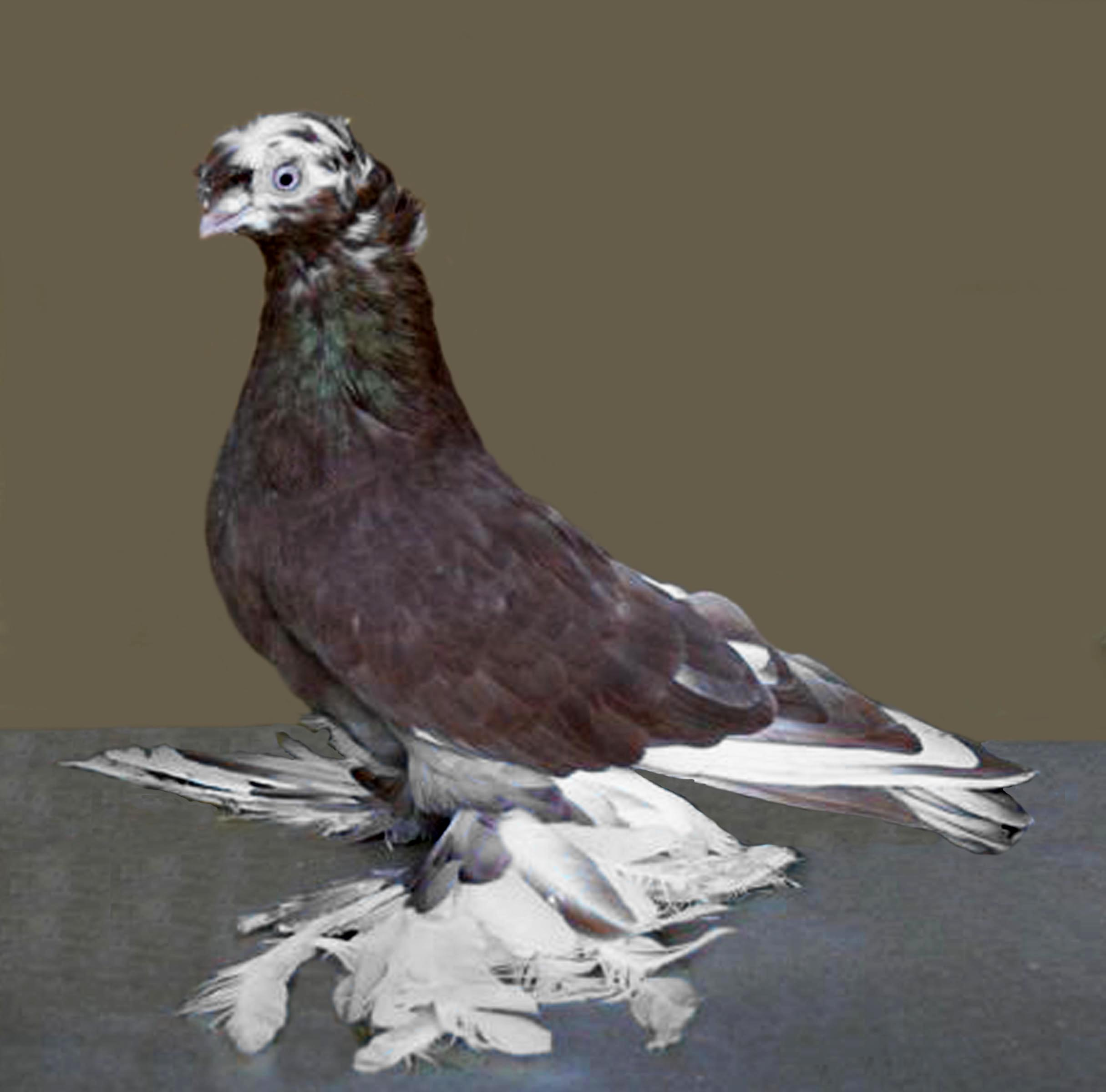
Usbekian Tumbler Red pied

== V ==
- Valencian Cropper, Dutch type (NL/333)
- Valencian Figurita (= Valencian Frill (E/722))
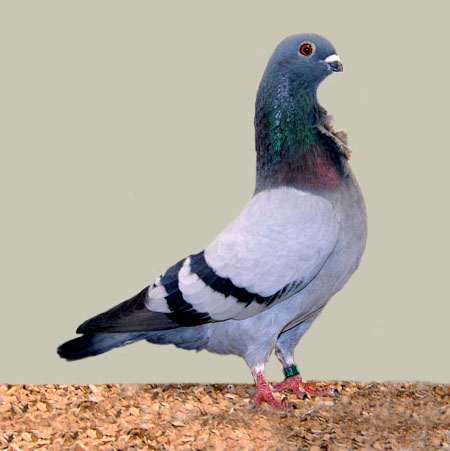
Valencian Figurita blue bar
- Valencian Giant Tenant Pigeon
- Valencian Homer
- Valencian Magany Homer
- Valencian Peter Runt
- Varna Tumbler (BG/1000)
- Veleño Pouter
- Vienna Highflyer (A/981)
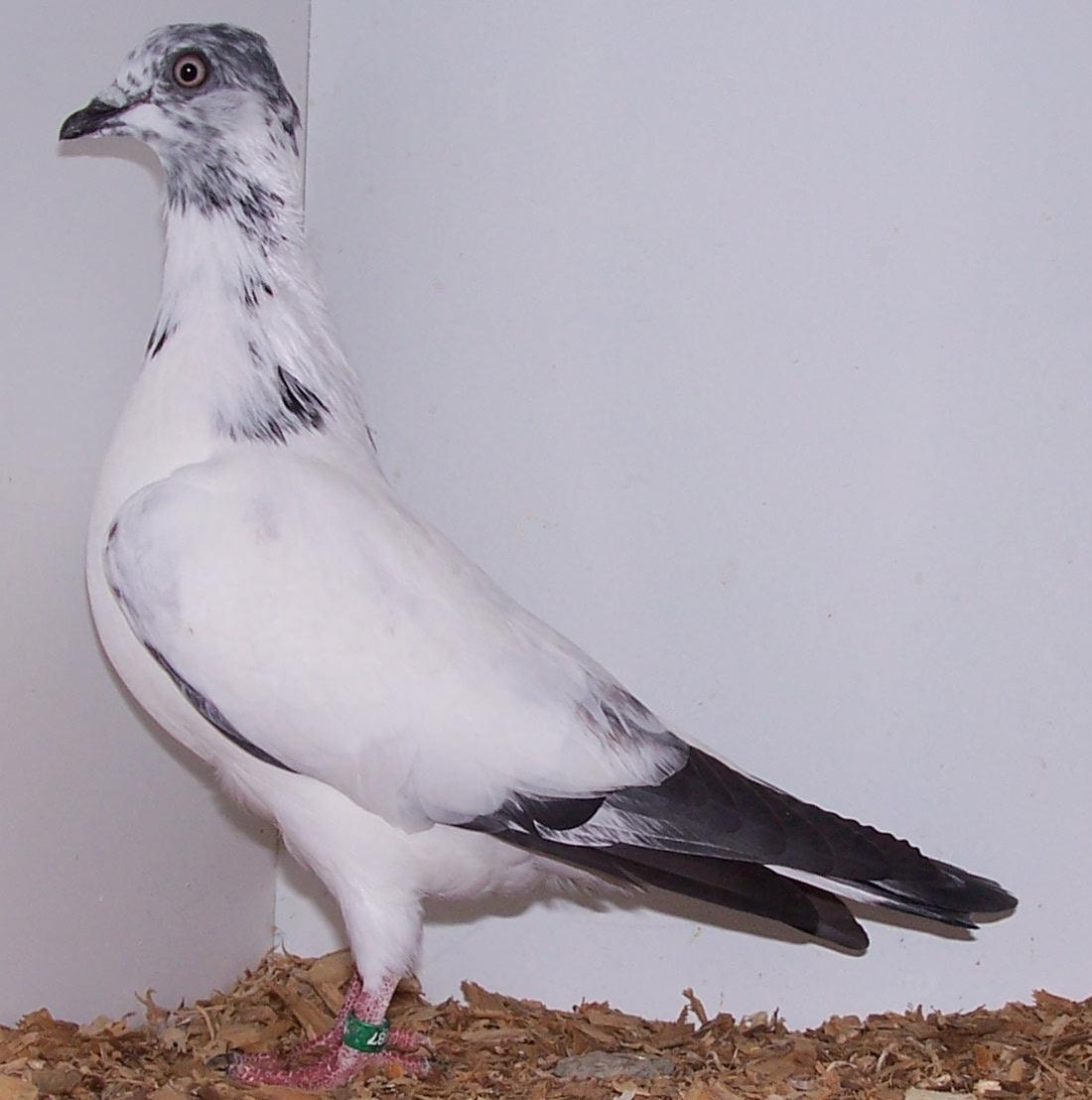
Vienna Highflyer
- Vienna Muffed Tumbler
- Vienna Röserlscheck (A/983)
- Viennese Gansel Tumbler (A/839)
- Vienna Long-faced Tumbler (A/835)
- Viennese Short-faced Tumbler (A/838)
- Viennese White-side Tumbler (A/837)
- Vogtland White-head Trumpeter (D/507)
- Volga Tumbler (RUS^{(D)}/874)
- Voorburg Shield Cropper (NL/327)
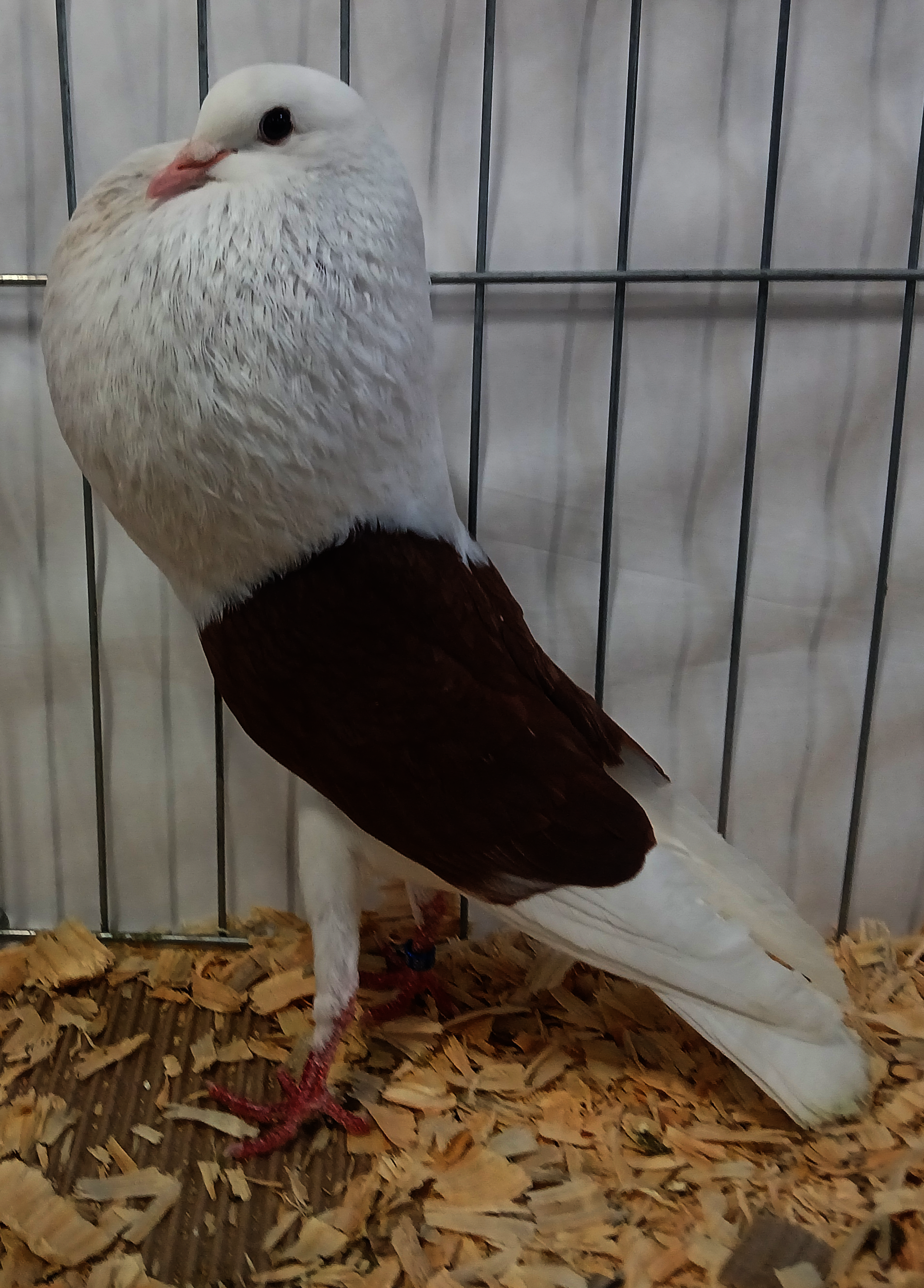
Voorburg Red

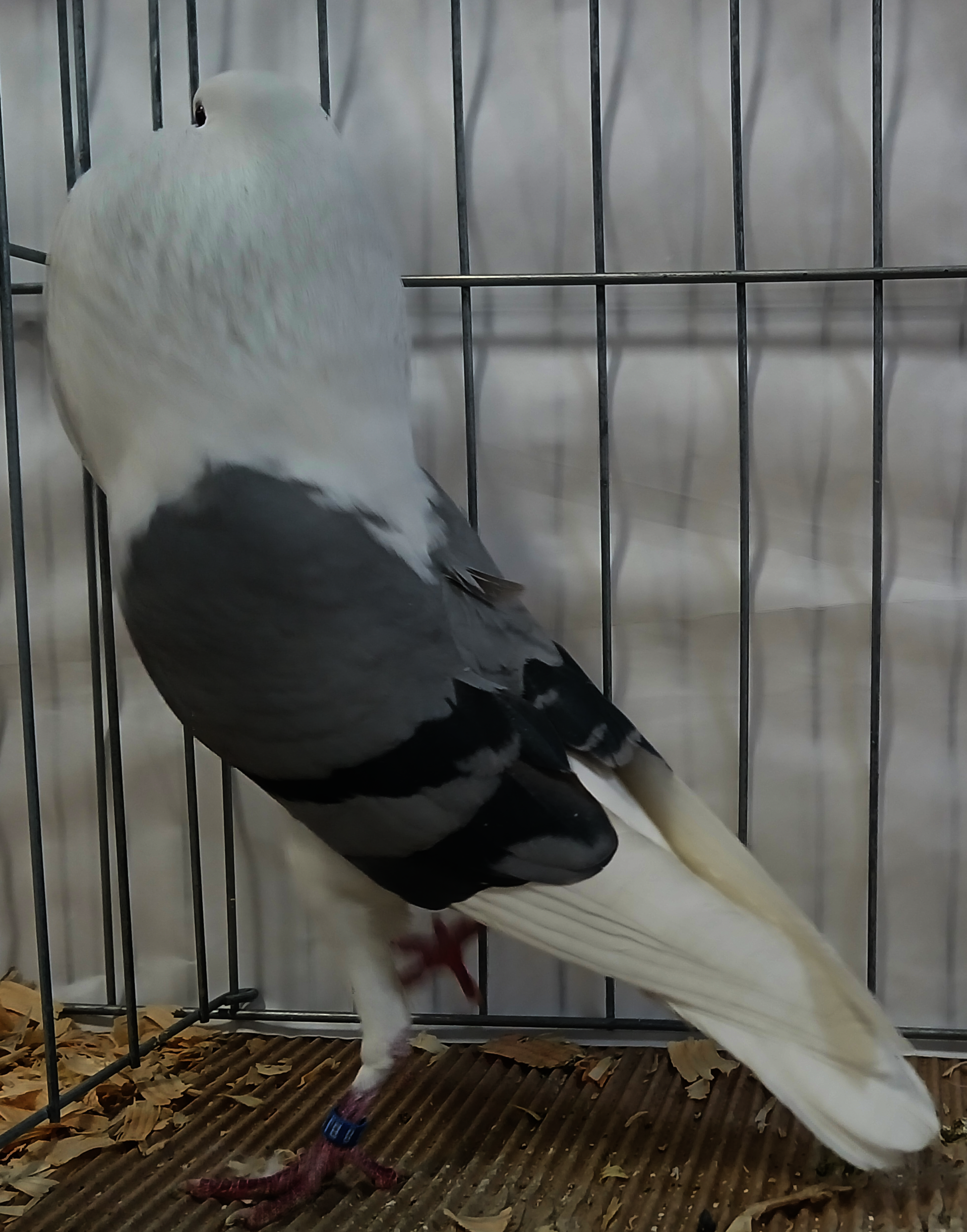
Voorburg blue bar
- Vrschatschka Tumbler (SRB/947)

== W ==
- Waldviertel Cropper (A/350)
- Warsaw Butterfly Tumbler (PL/936)
- West of England Tumbler (GB/833)
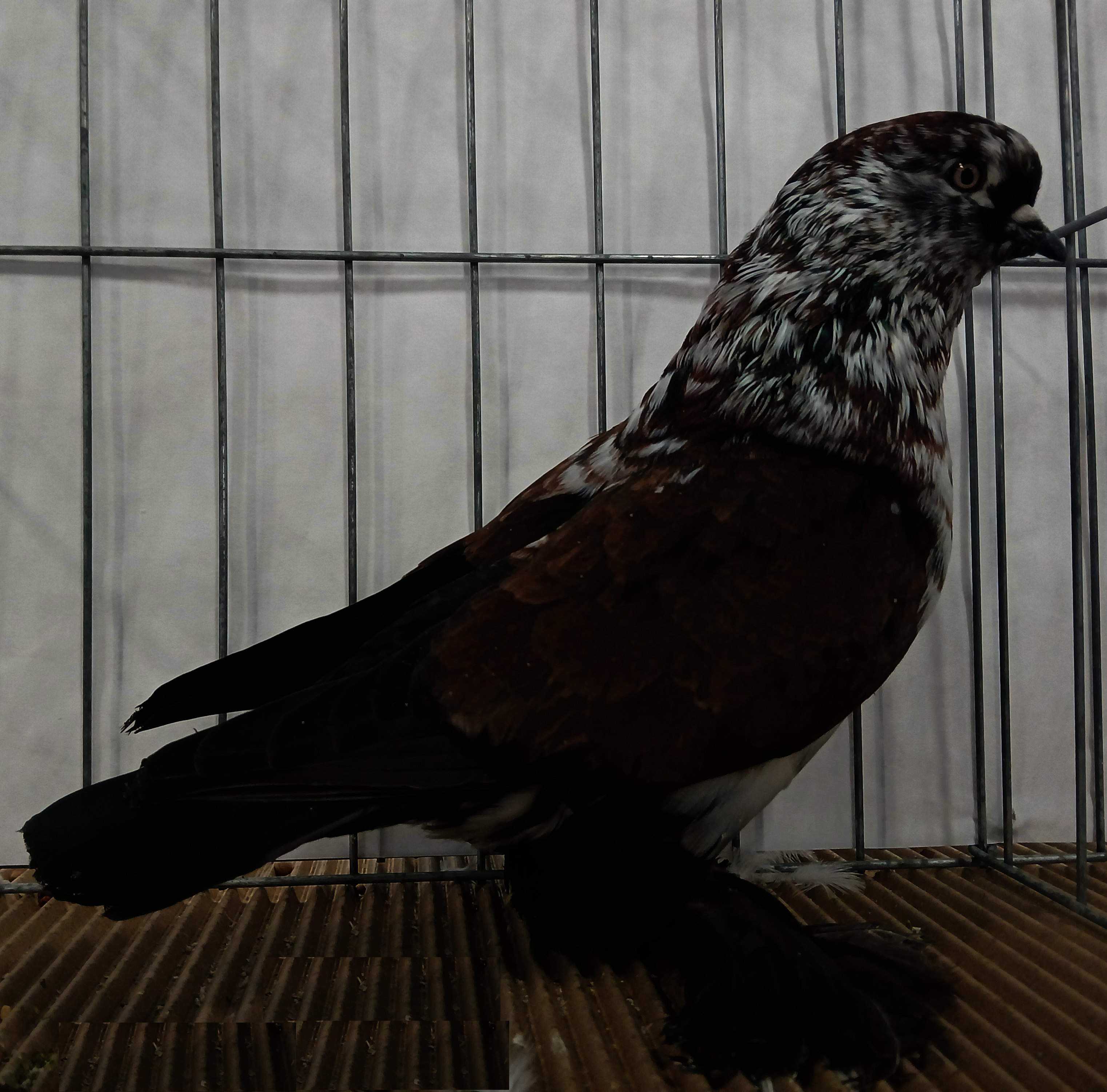
West of England

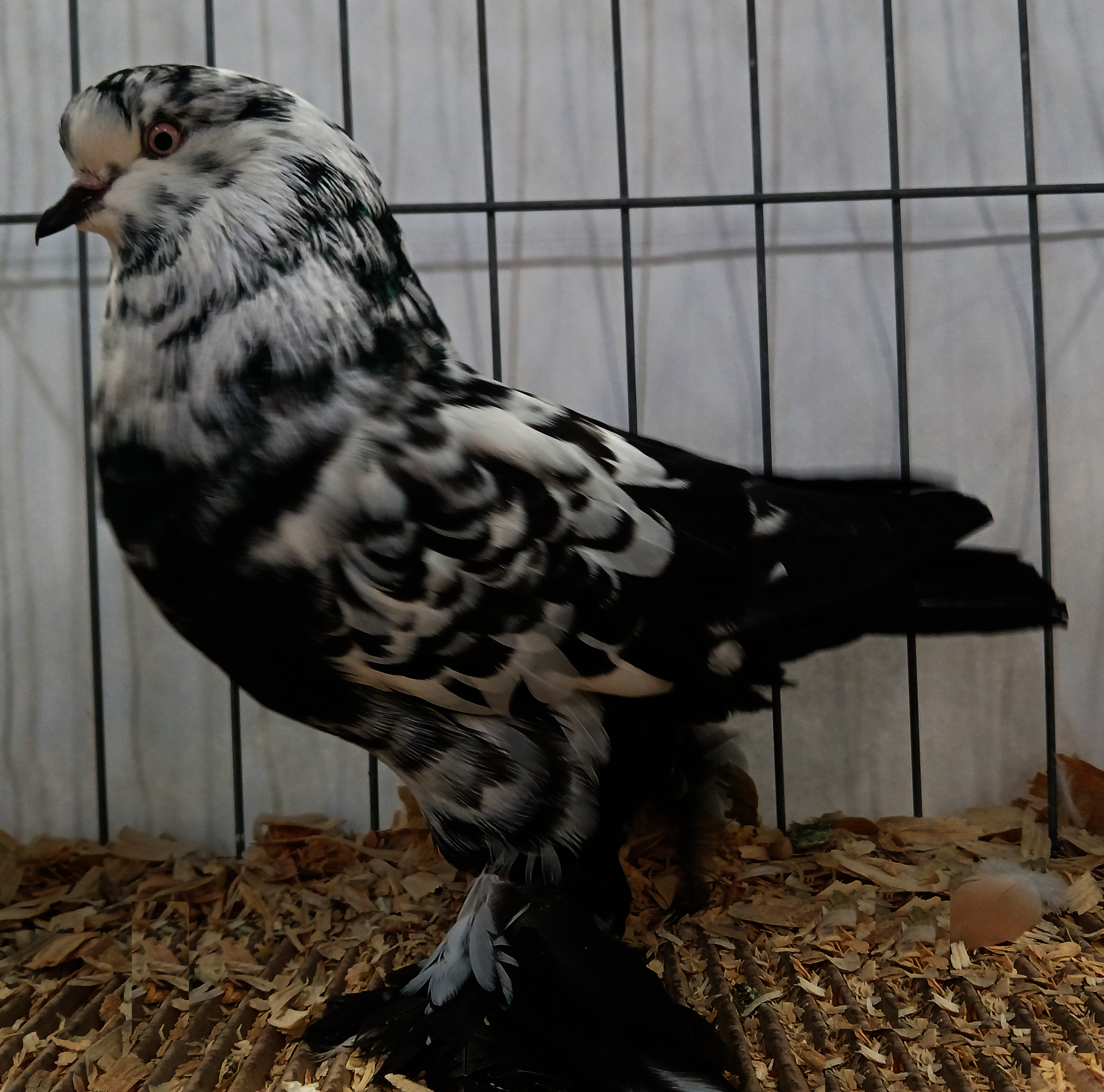
West of England
- Wiggetal Colour-tail (CH/429)
- Wolverhampton Badge Tumbler (GB/917)
- Wolverhampton Magpie Tumbler (GB/916)
- Wurttemberg Moorhead (D/442)

== Z ==
- Zagreb Tumbler (HR/951)
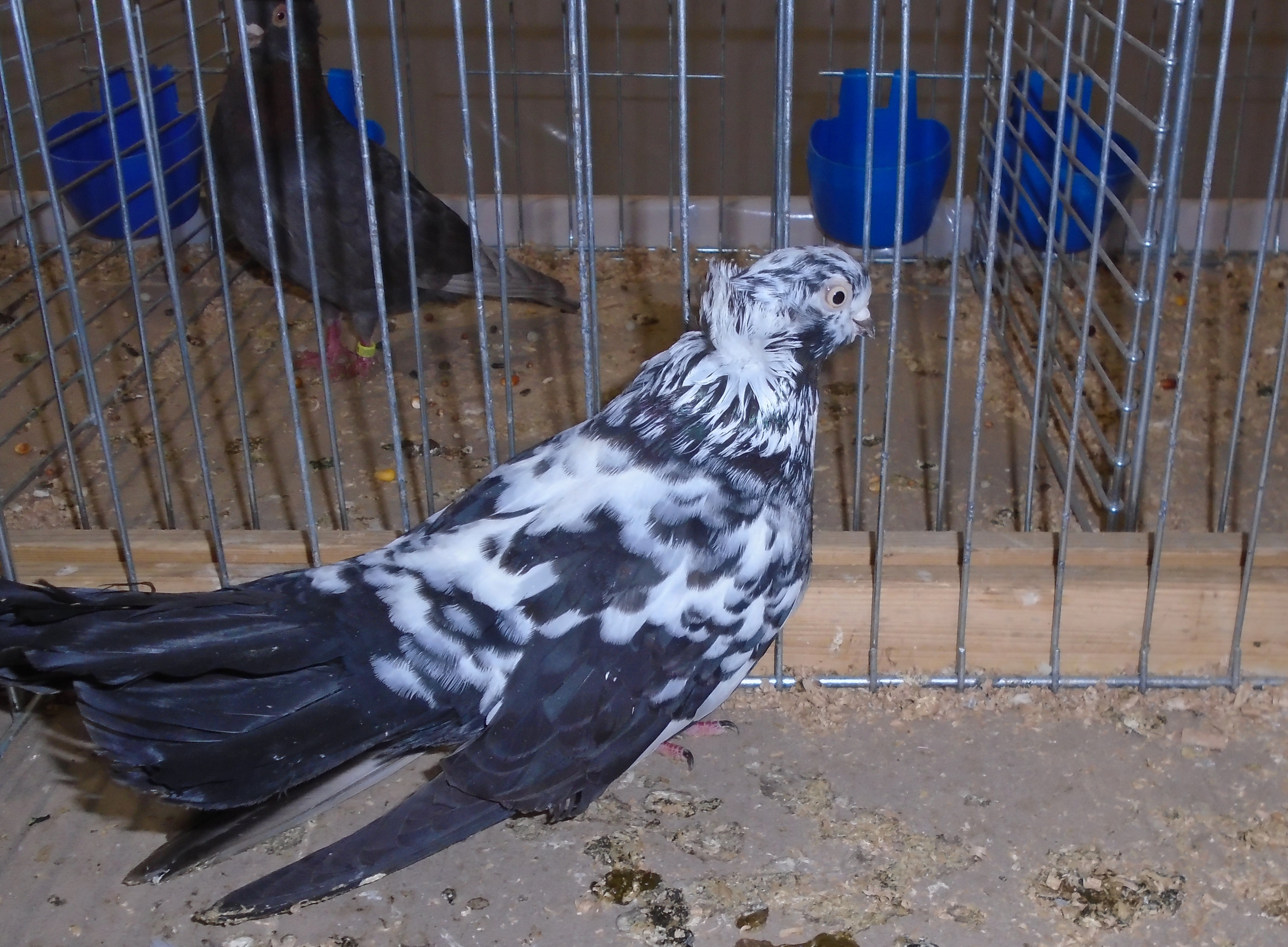
Zagreb Tumbler (Croatian: Zagrebački prevrtač)
- Zira Gola (Bangladeshi High Flyer)
- Zitterhall (= Stargard Shaker (D/818))
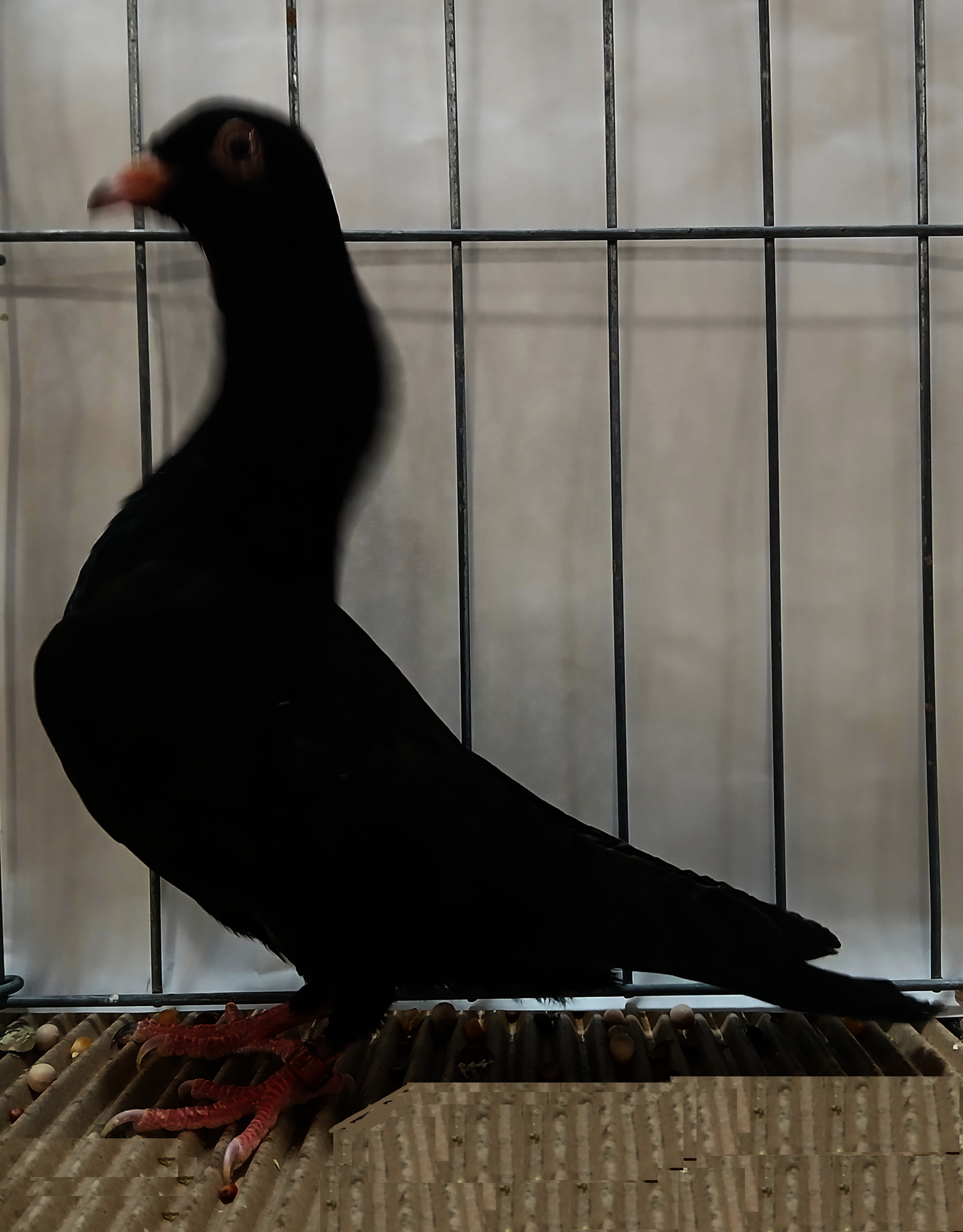
Zitterhall
- Zurich White-tail (CH/430)
