= Roller (pigeon) =

Breed of pigeon

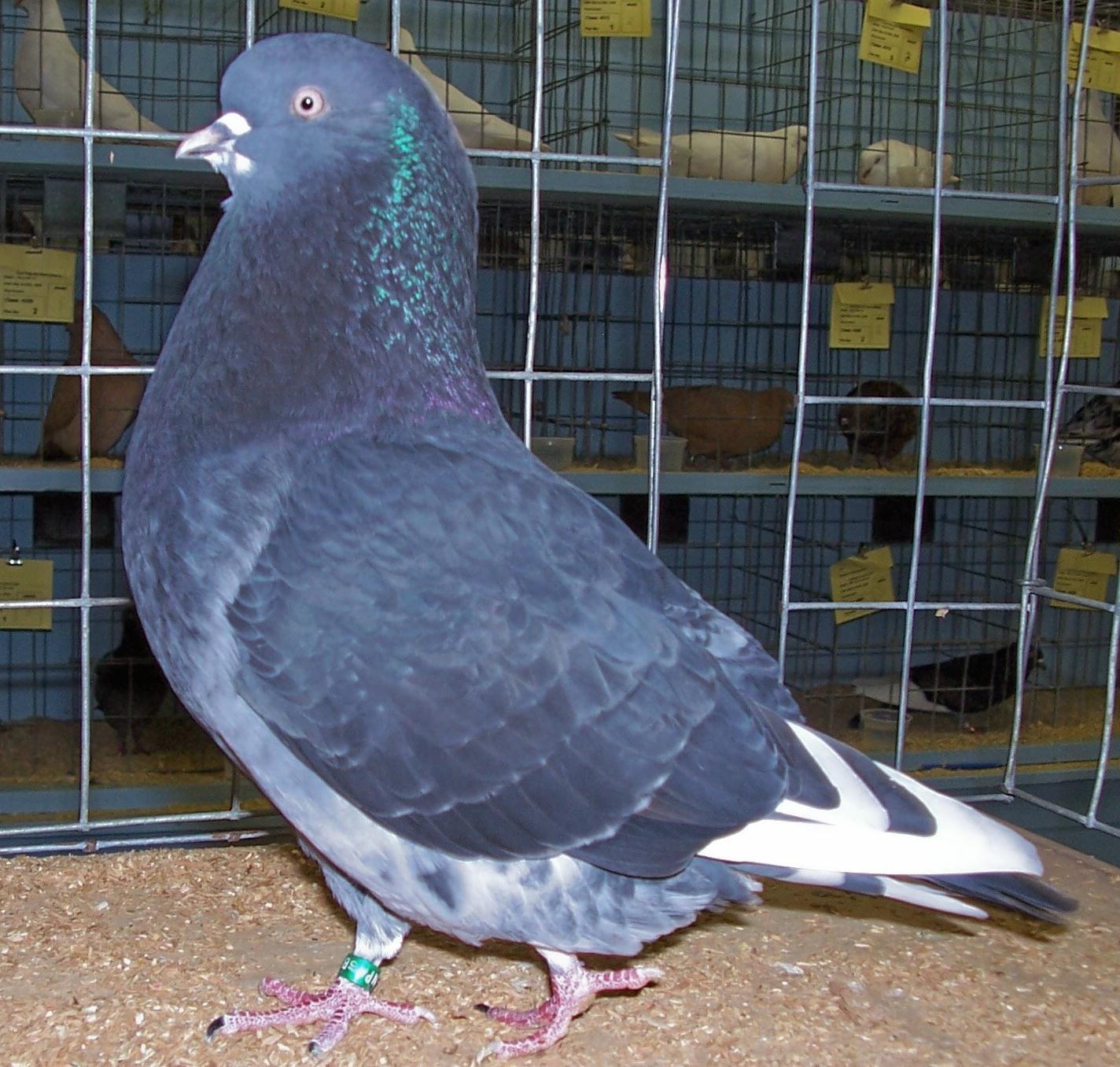
A Birmingham Roller

A roller pigeon is a domesticated breed or variety of pigeon that has been selected for its ability to tumble or roll in the air. Varieties of roller pigeons include:

- Birmingham Roller
- Galatz Roller
- Oriental Roller
- Parlor Roller

== See also ==
- List of pigeon breeds
- Tumbler pigeons
