= Birmingham Roller =

Breed of pigeon

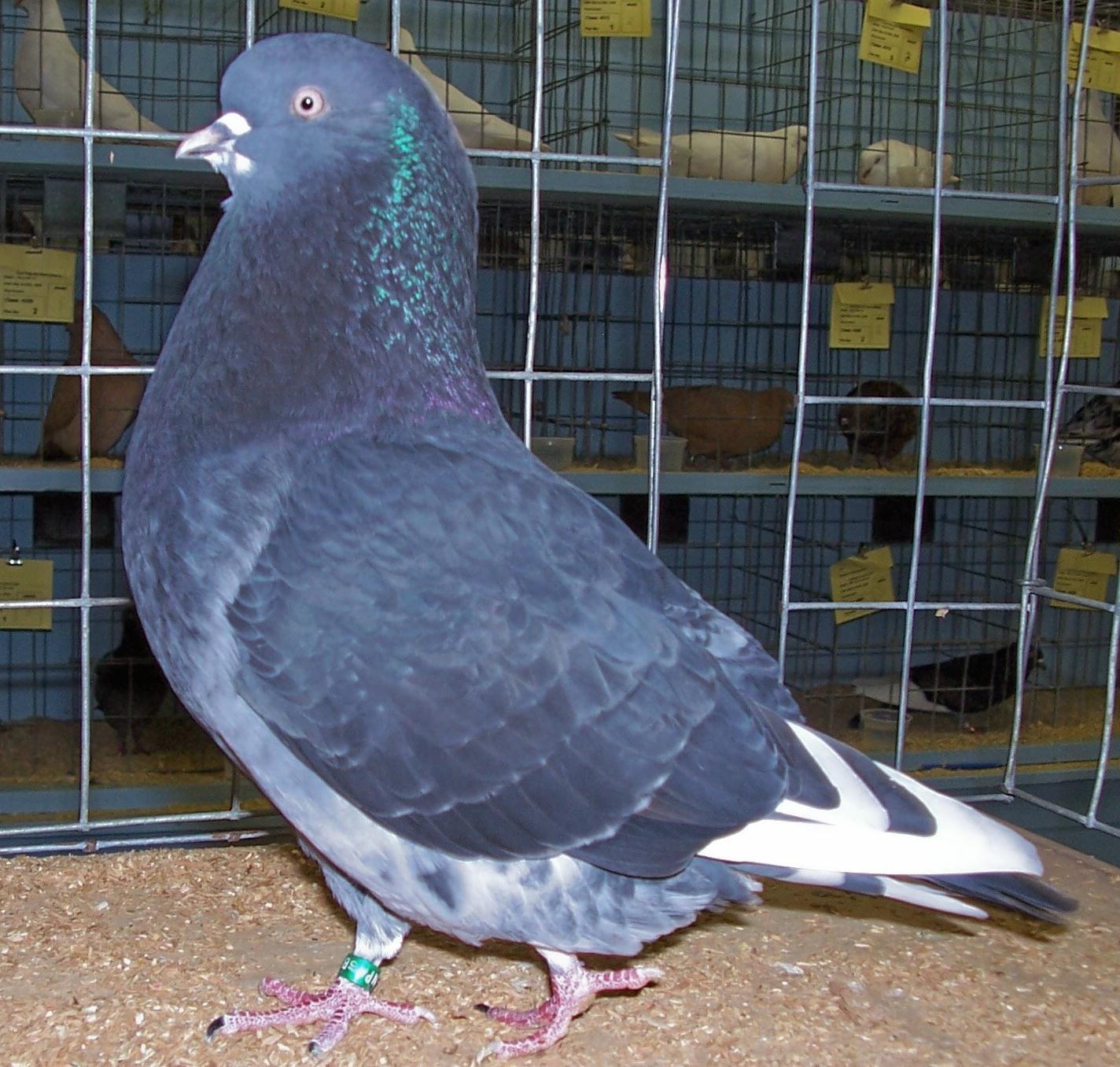
- Birmingham Roller
- Conservation status: Common
- Country of origin: England

Traits
- Crest type: None

Classification
- Australian Breed Group: group 7 Flying
- US Breed Group: Flying
- EE Breed Group: not listed GB Flying

Notes
- Originally a strictly flying breed it is now cultivated both for show and aerial performance.

The Birmingham Roller is a breed of domesticated roller pigeon that originated in Birmingham, England. They were developed via selective breeding, for their ability to do rapid backward somersaults while flying.

== Rolling motion ==
It is unknown why the Birmingham Roller and other roller pigeons tumble. While it is true that the birds do perform backward somersaults in flight, the exact neurological causes of the rolling behaviour are still unknown.

This bird has a genetic inclination to flip backwards, provided adequate training, diet, and exercise. The spinning can appear to be so fast that the bird looks like a ball of feathers falling toward the ground. They recover from the spin and return to their flock, called a "kit" in competition. The pigeon continues to do the same acrobatics with regular frequency, often in unison with other birds in the kit. The frequency, depth, style, tightness of roll, and angle are all determined by careful and methodical breeding. The flight time, height of flight, and responsiveness to the trainer's commands are all determined by strict training and diet, along with consistent daily routine.

A noted pigeon fancier, William Pensom described the motion thus:

A Birmingham roller is not necessarily one that is deep to the extreme, but one that displays in its performance a likeness to a cricket ball spinning to earth in a straight line; the old saying put it, "Like a ball and straight as a boat line." The bird on starting generally raises its wings, claps, spreads its tail slightly downward, and finishes in a similar manner; any deviation from a straight course cannot be classified as a true roll. The true roller shows no separate movement between each revolution, but continues in an unbroken spin; incidentally, such phrases as "inconceivable rapidity" and "lightning whirl" refer to the rapid manner in which each somersault is executed, and not, as one might suppose, to the descent from the start of the roll until the finish.

There have been more recent scientific studies of roller pigeons, including the mode of inheritance and a high-speed video analysis of the specific movements involved in rolling and tumbling in pigeons. In brief, rolling and tumbling in flight or on the ground are genetically the same phenomenon, but differ in duration, and hence, the length of the tumble or roll. The most extreme example of rolling in flight is a "roll-down", in which case a bird will somersault to the ground from any height and, on the ground, the parlor roller, which cannot fly at all, and somersaults backward (or rolls) every time it tries to fly.

The specific cause of the rolling phenomenon has not yet been determined, but the high-speed video analysis of parlor rollers in motion shows that their head goes backwards and their tail upwards when they raise their wings, the exact opposite of what a normal pigeon would do in attempting to fly.

== Similar breeds ==
The Birmingham Roller has both a flying type and a show type, and is fairly popular. The American Pigeon Journal devoted an entire issue to the breed in June of 1958. Show Rollers are larger than the flying variety, and are bred just for show. A similar breed called a Parlor Roller look much like Birmingham Rollers, but can't fly; rather, they spin backwards, somersaulting on the ground for many yards. Oriental Rollers are another aerial performer and come in many colour varieties.

== Gallery ==
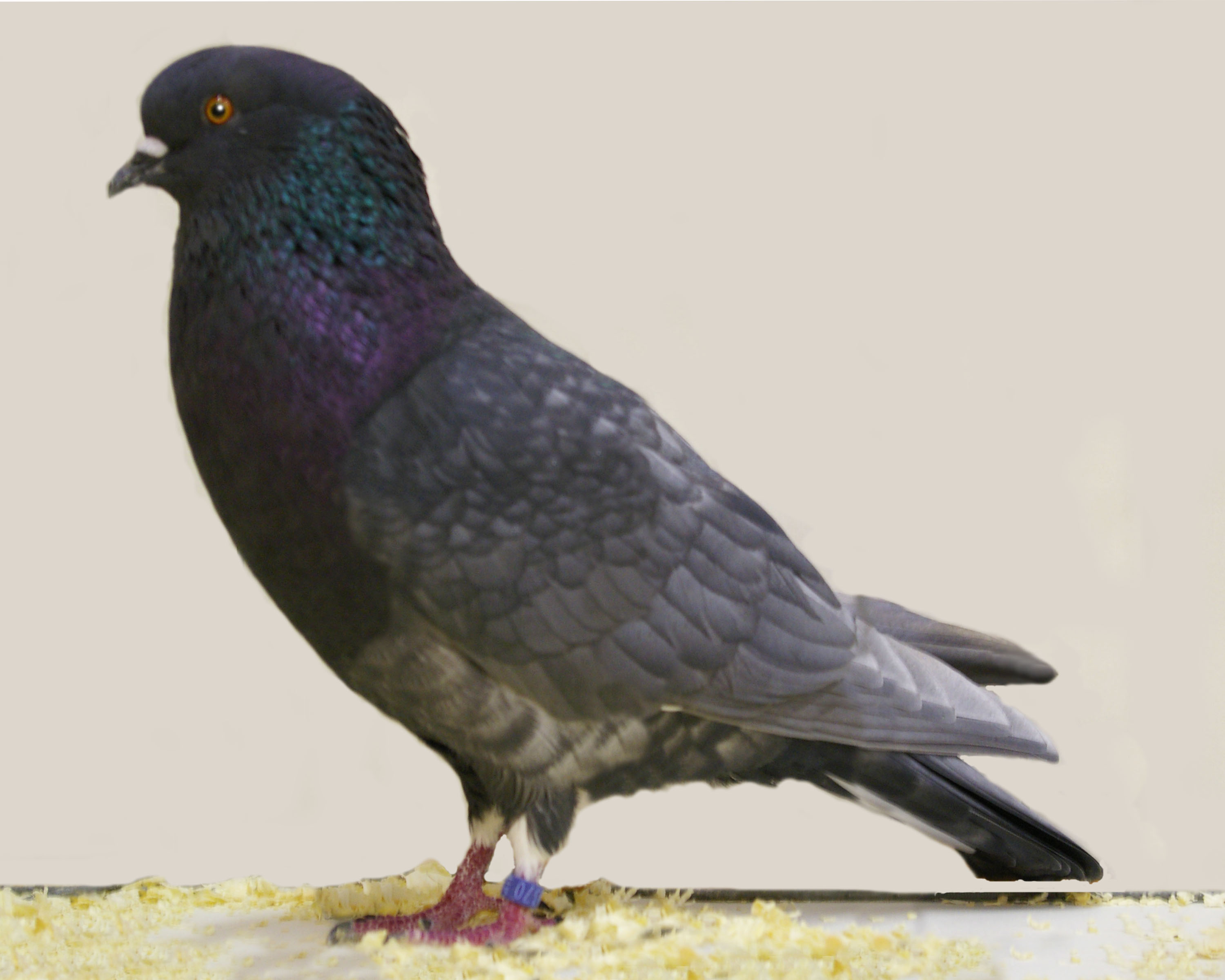
Andalusian_blue

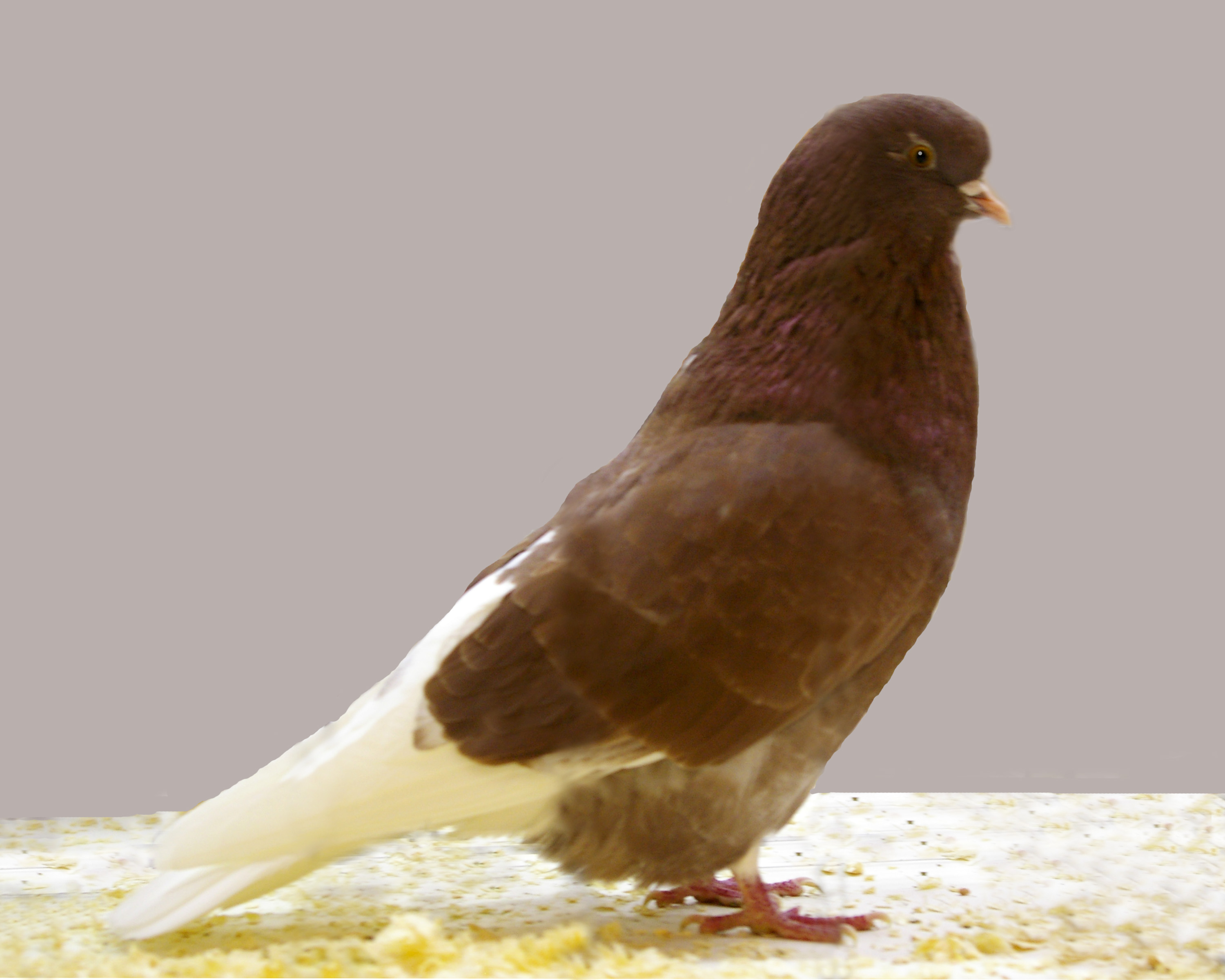
Red

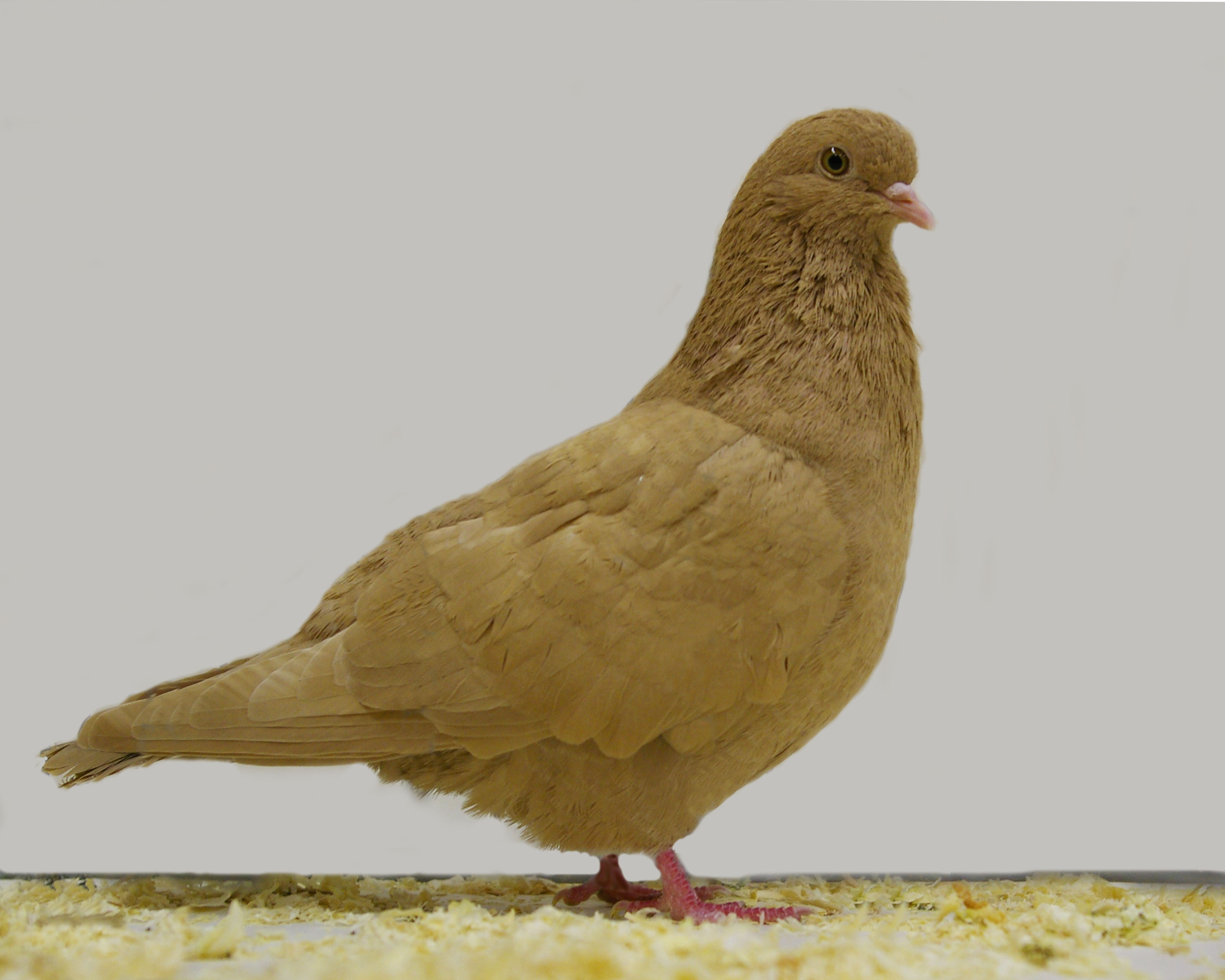
Yellow_self

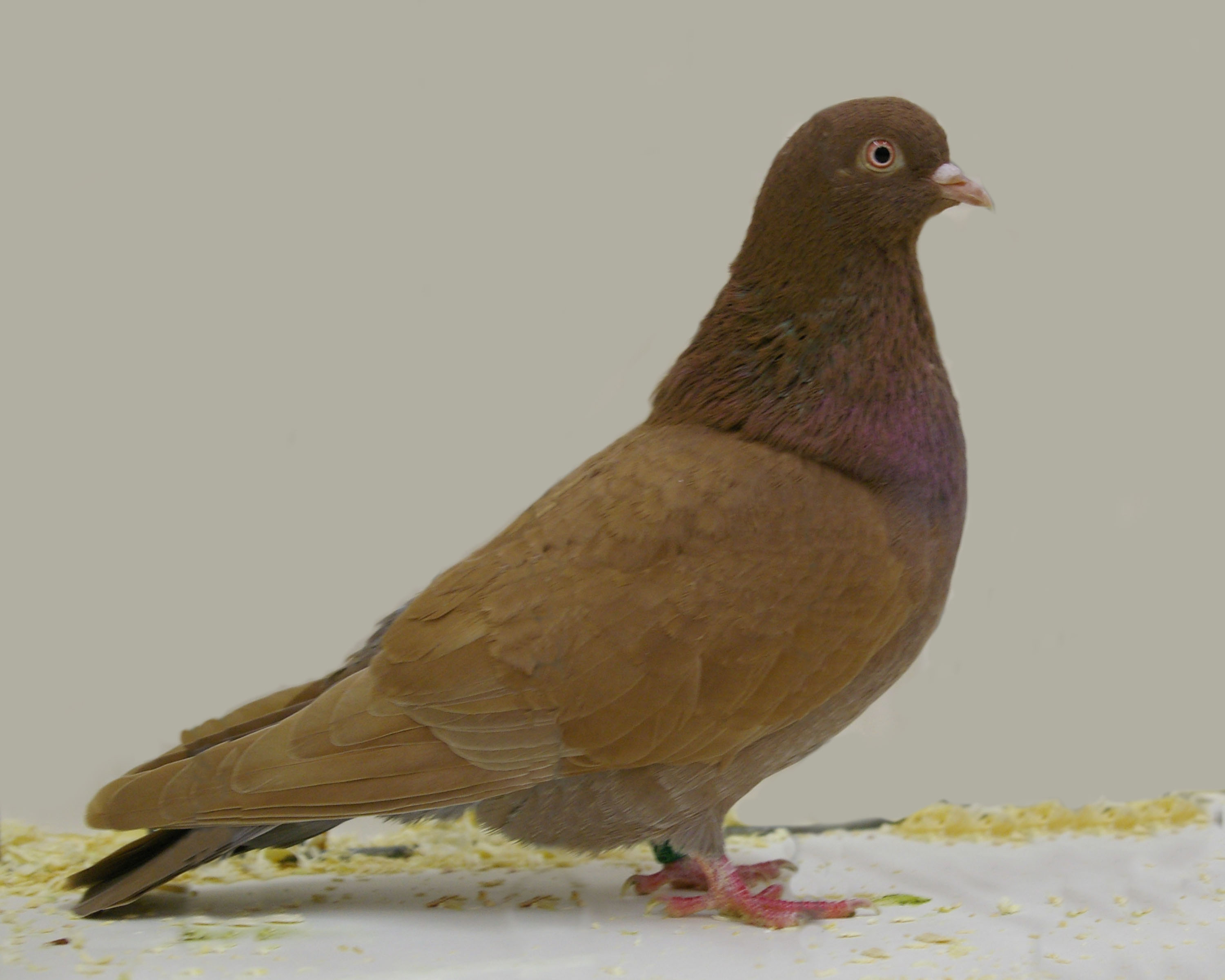
Red_self

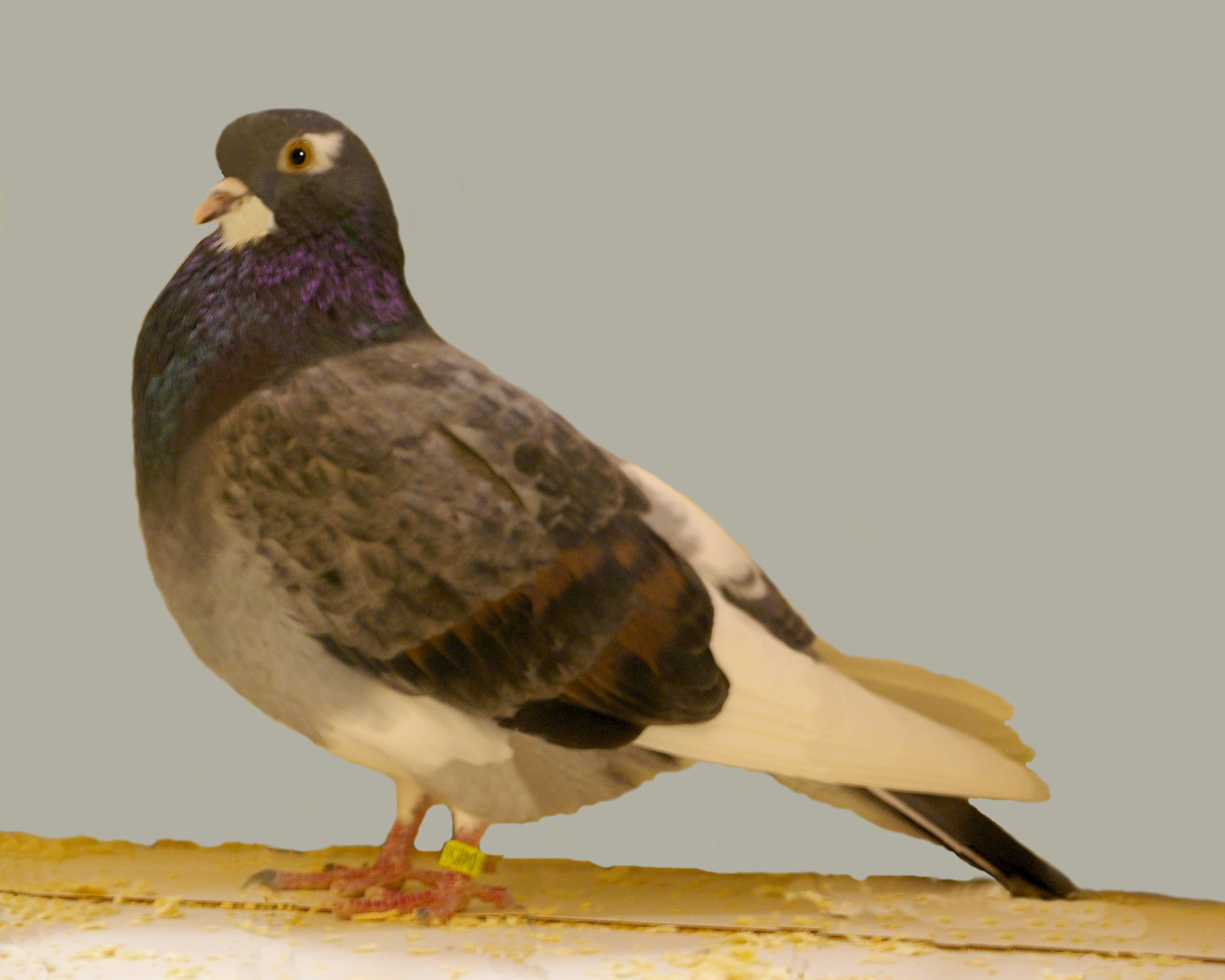
Bronze barred

== See also ==
- Pigeon Diet
- Pigeon Housing
- List of pigeon breeds
