= Crested Soultz =

Breed of pigeon

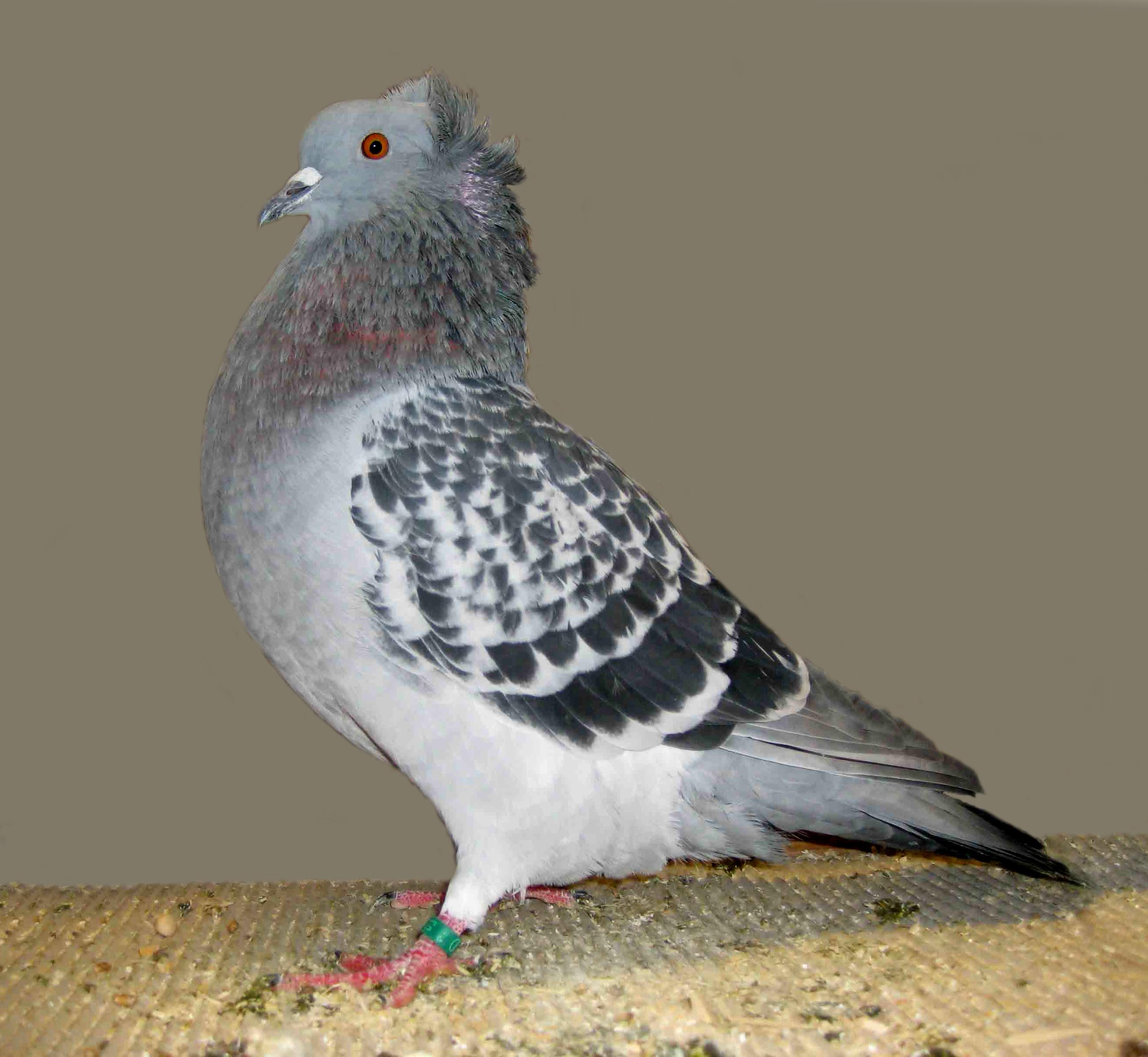
- Blue check
- Conservation status: uncommon
- Other names: Soultz
- Nicknames: Soultzer
- Country of origin: France
- Distribution: Europe, US
- Type: Show

Traits
- Weight: Male: 16oz; Female: 15oz
- Crest type: shell to fan shape
- Color: black\blue, ash red
- Lifespan: 12 years
- Markings: check, bar, and barless
- Length: 14 inches
- eye color: orange to red

Classification
- Australian: Not listed
- European: Utility
- US: Form

The Crested Soultz is a breed of fancy pigeon. Crested Soultz, along with other varieties of domesticated pigeons, are all descendants from the rock pigeon (Columba livia).

== Gallery ==
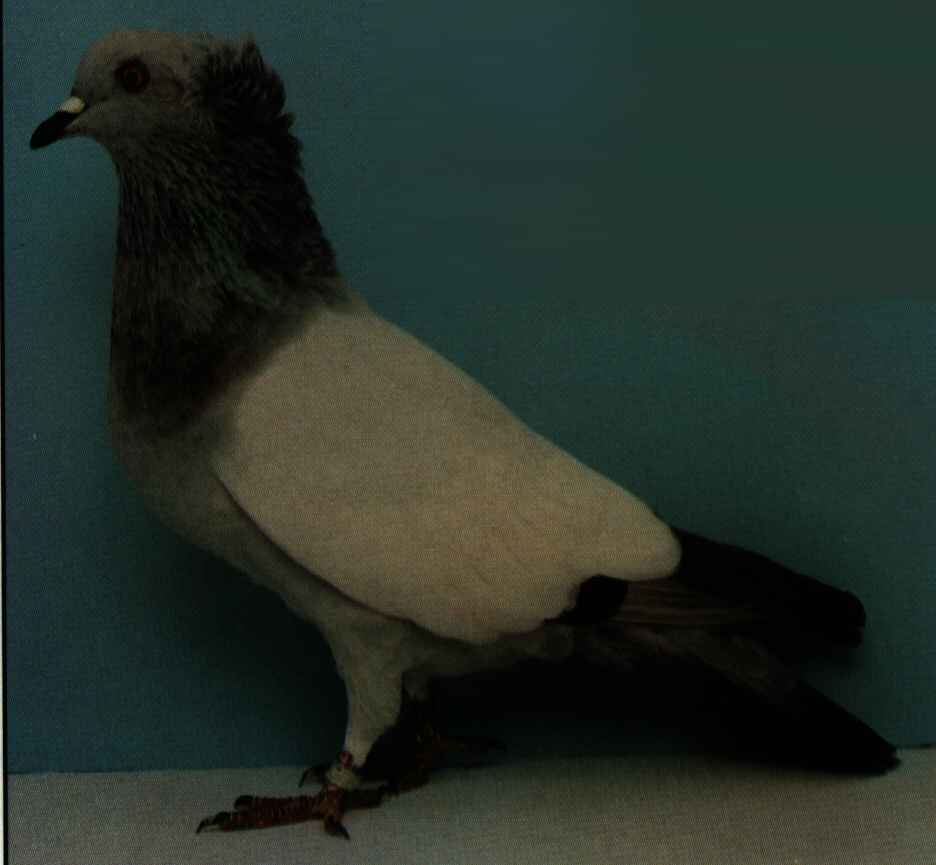
Blue barless

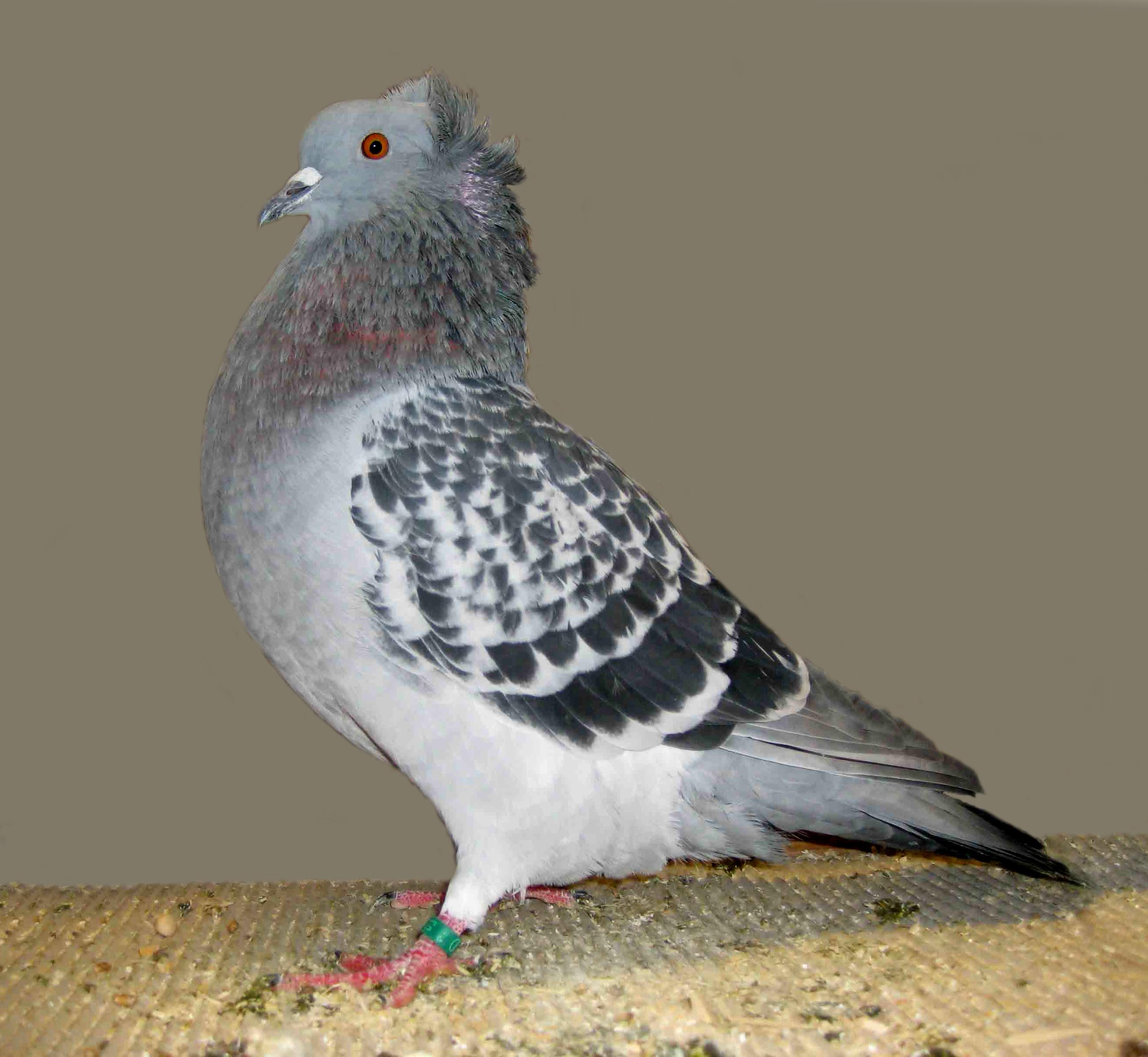
Blue check

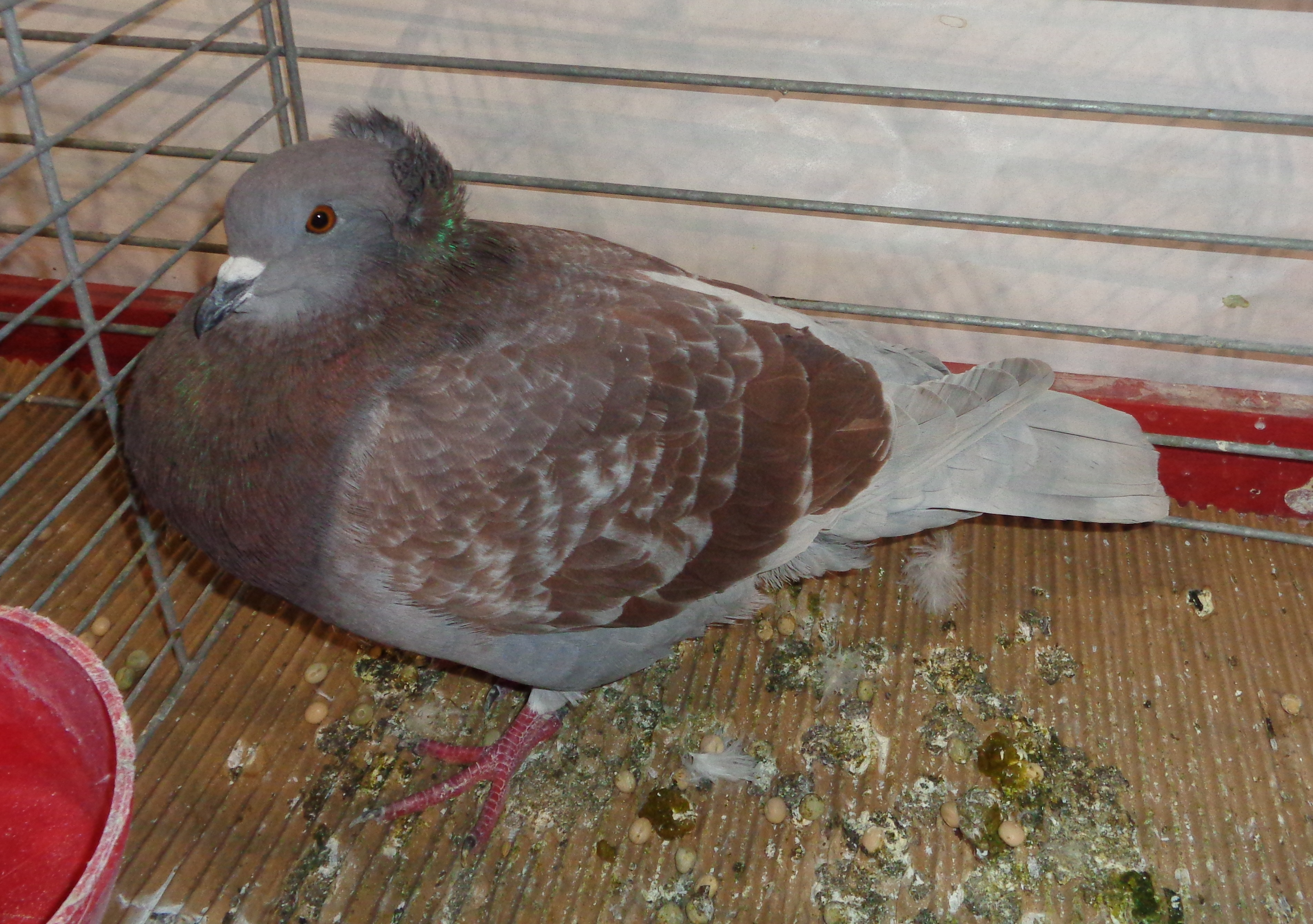
Red Check

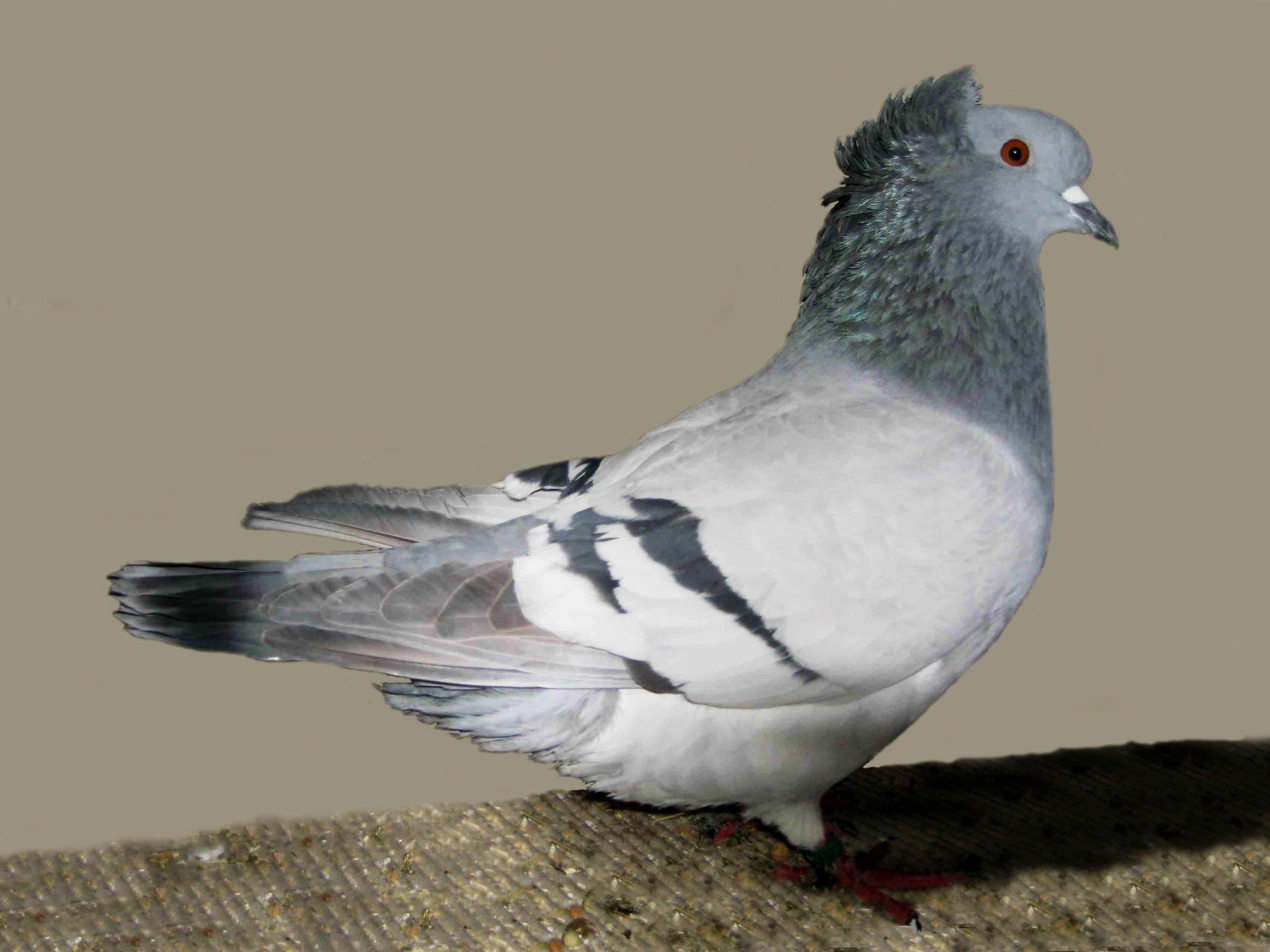
Silver bar

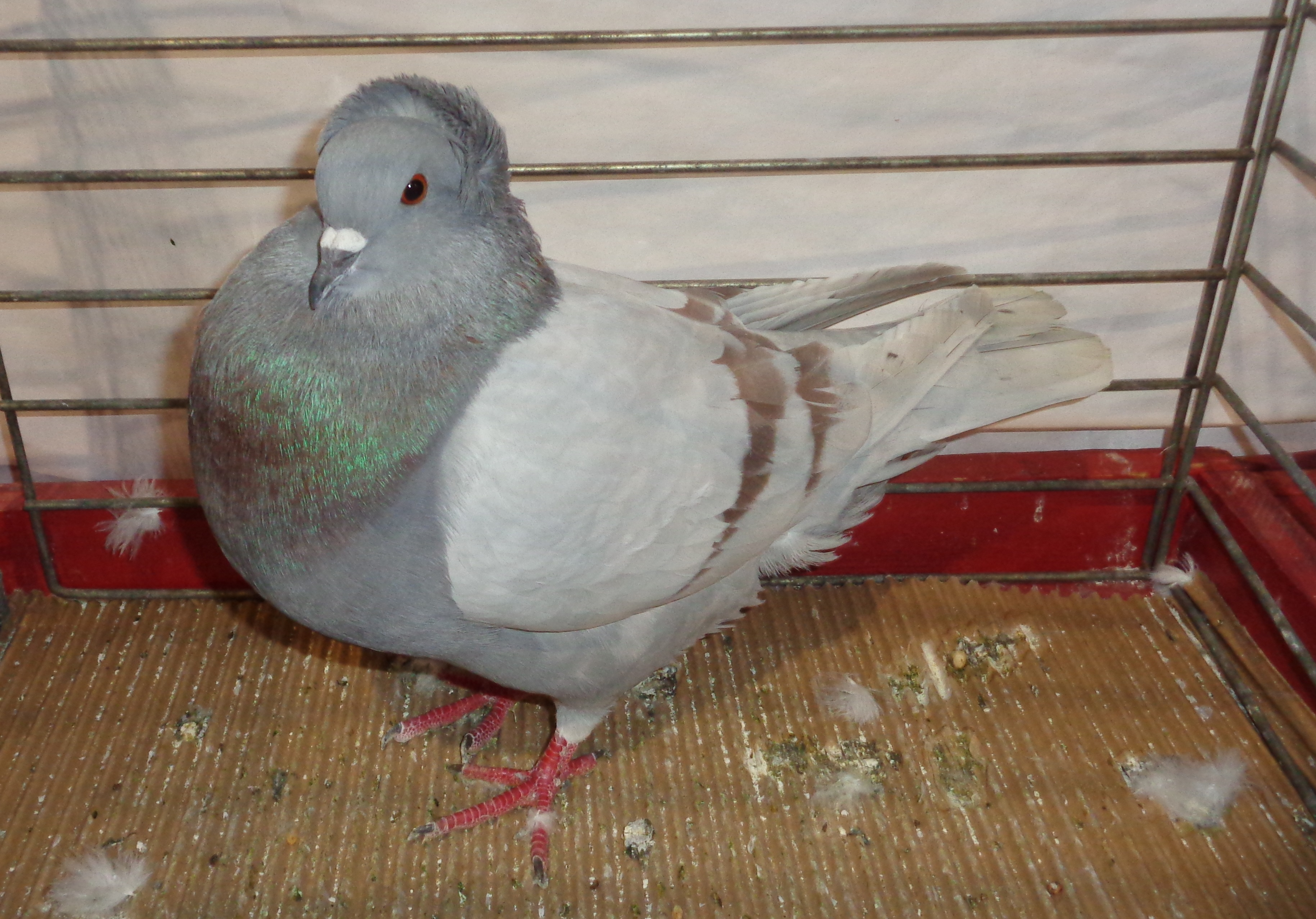
Red bar

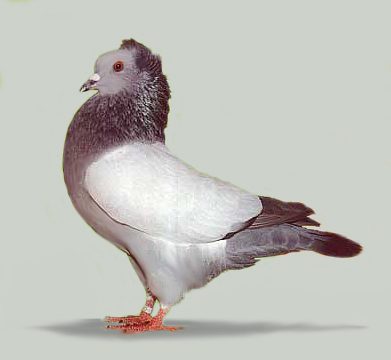
Silver barless

== See also ==
- Pigeon Diet
- Pigeon Housing
- List of pigeon breeds
- APJ August 1965 containing article on breed
