= Old German Magpie Tumbler =

Breed of pigeon

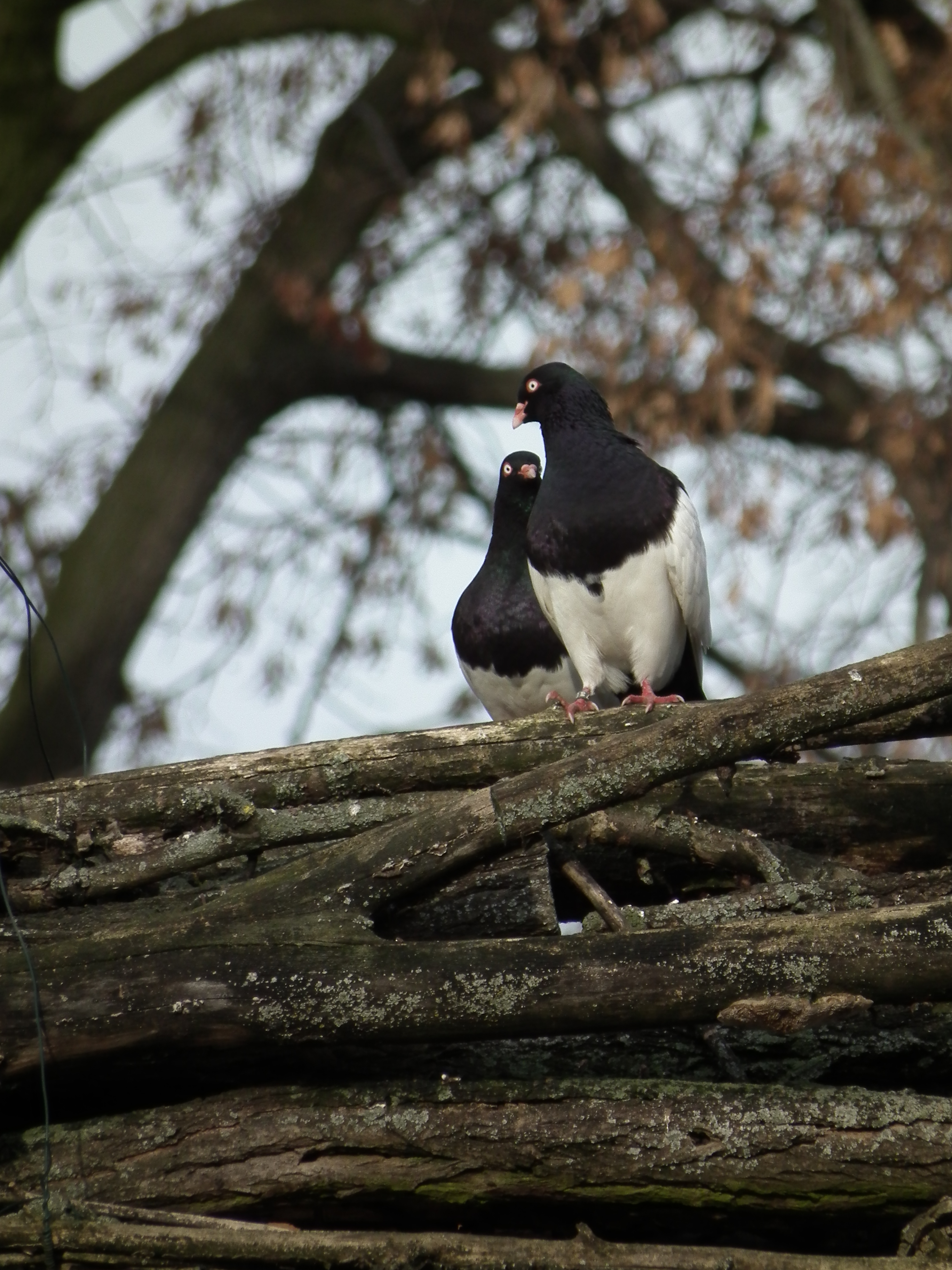
- Elster Purzler
- Conservation status: Common
- Other names: Elsterpurzler

Classification
- Australian Breed Group: not listed
- US Breed Group: Flying
- EE Breed Group: Tumbler and Highflyer

Notes
- Magpied marking with a white eye

The Old German Magpie Tumbler (German: Elsterpurzler) is a breed of fancy pigeon developed over many years of selective breeding. The Old German Magpie Tumbler, along with other varieties of domesticated pigeons are all descendants from the rock pigeon (Columba livia).

== Gallery ==
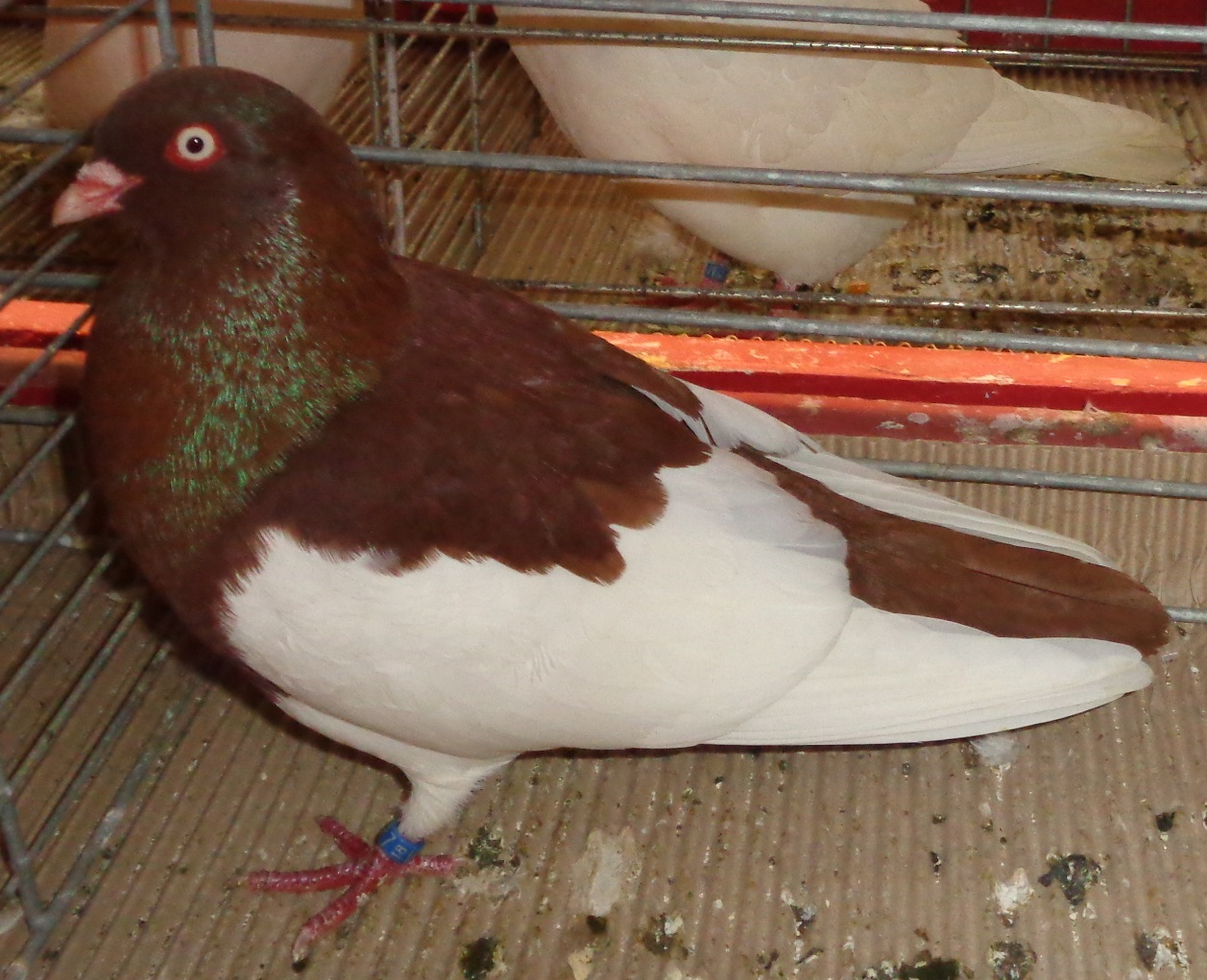
Red Magpie marked Culbutant

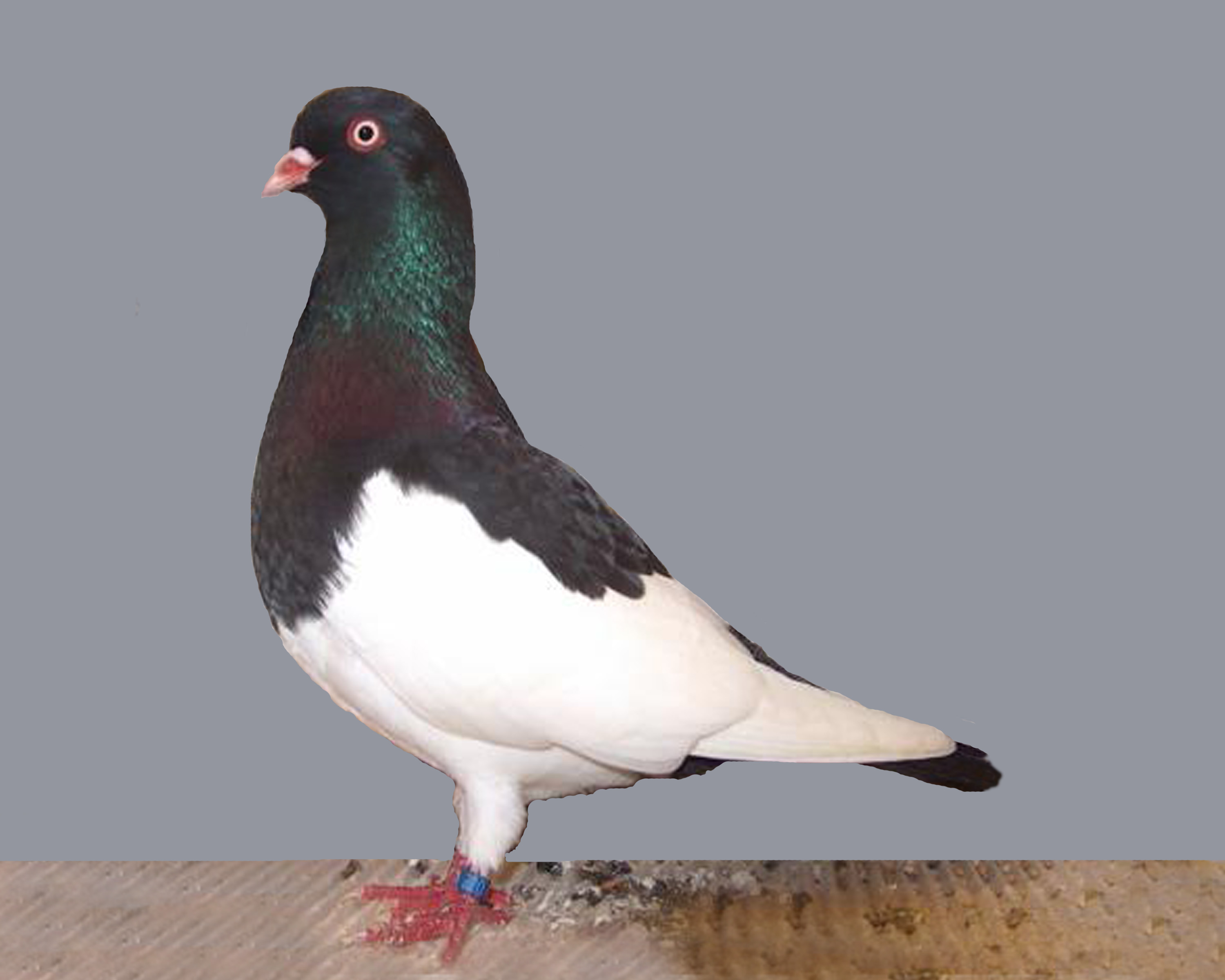
Blue Old German Magpie Tumbler

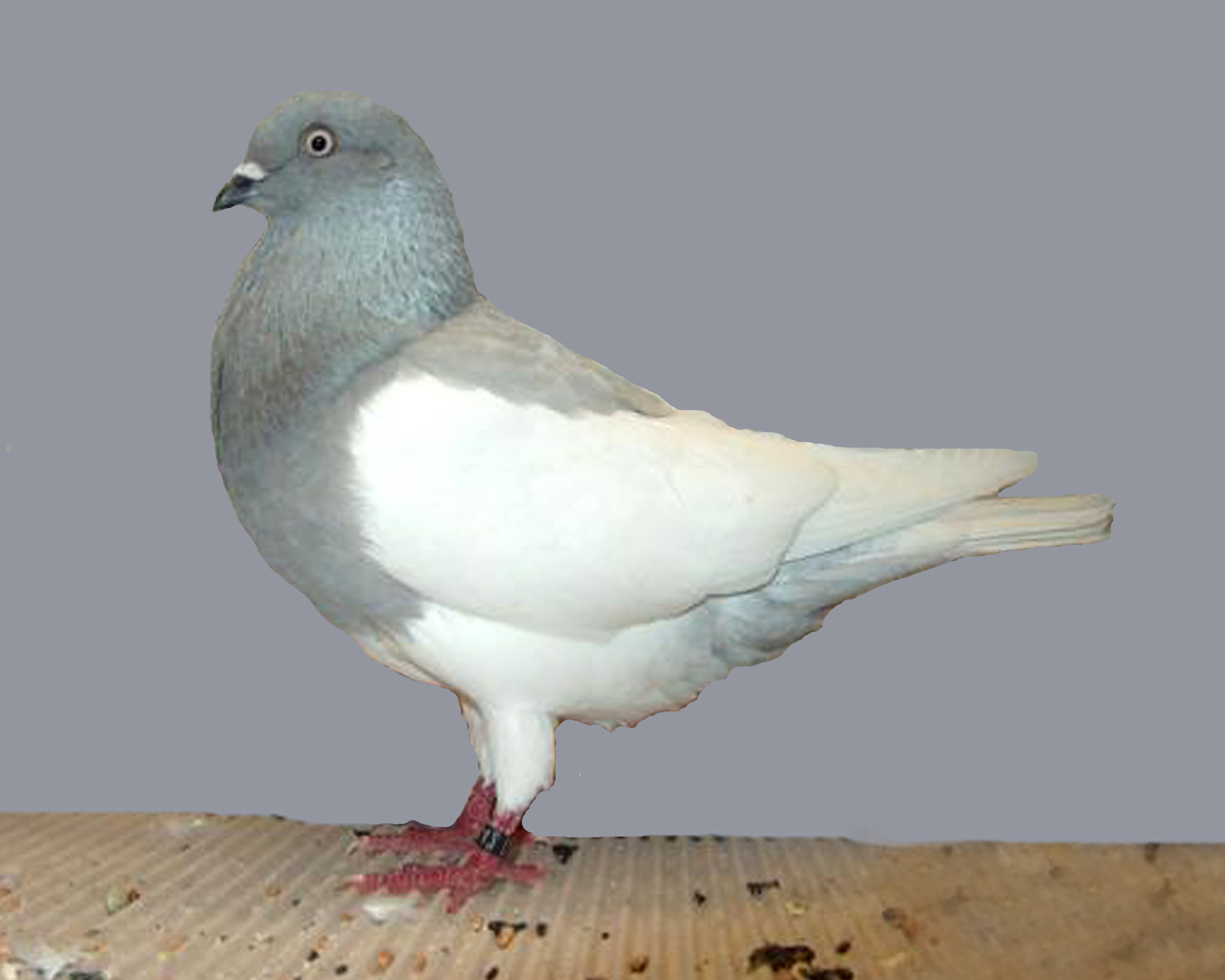
Silver Old german Magpie Tumbler

== See also ==
- Pigeon Diet
- Pigeon Housing
- List of pigeon breeds
