= Egyptian Swift pigeon =

Breed of pigeon

Egyptian Swift
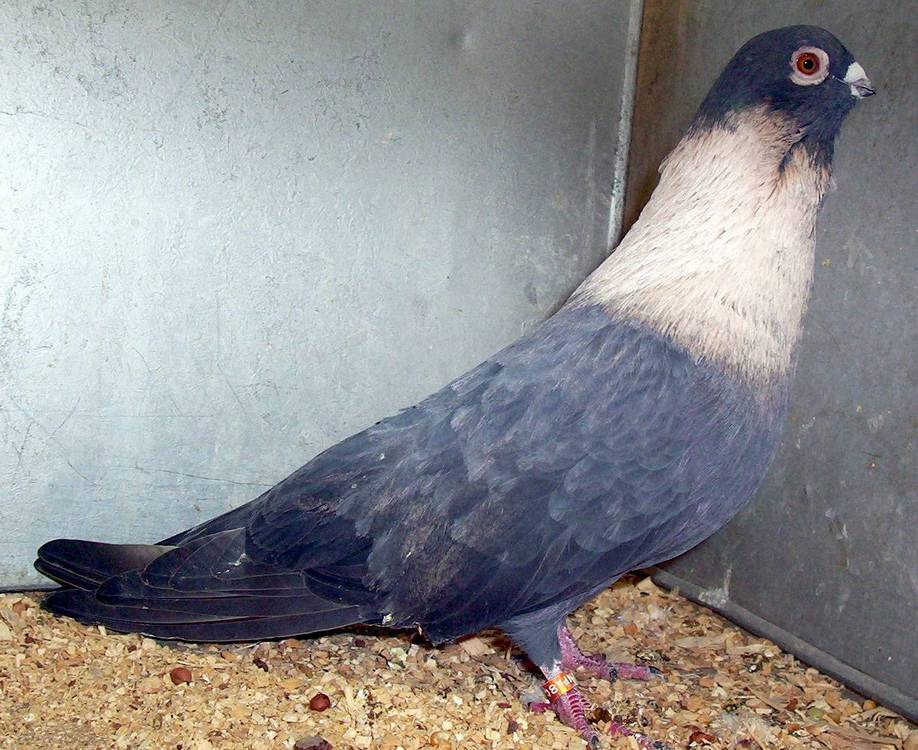
- Egyptian Swift
- Conservation status: Common
- Country of origin: Egypt

Classification
- Australian Breed Group: Group 4 Homers & Hens
- US Breed Group: Flying pigeons
- EE Breed Group: Utility pigeons (form)

The Egyptian Swift is a breed of fancy pigeon developed over many years of selective breeding. The name swift was given by reason of a resemblance to the bird of that name. Egyptian Swifts, along with other varieties of domesticated pigeons, are all descendants of the rock dove (Columba livia). The breed is known for its long wings and tail and its short beak. The flying Egyptian Swift is one or two inches shorter than a show Egyptian Swift.

In Egypt the standards passed on for many generations. The most veteran fanciers of a neighbourhood act as judges to settle differences among beginners. That system worked adequately and led to regional varieties of the breed. The main local groups are: Safi, Otati, Anbary Asmar, Ahmar Gohzar, Bolk, Mesawed, Rehani, Karakandy, Absy, Halaby, Egyptian Halaby, Egyptian Absy and Kojook.

== gallery ==
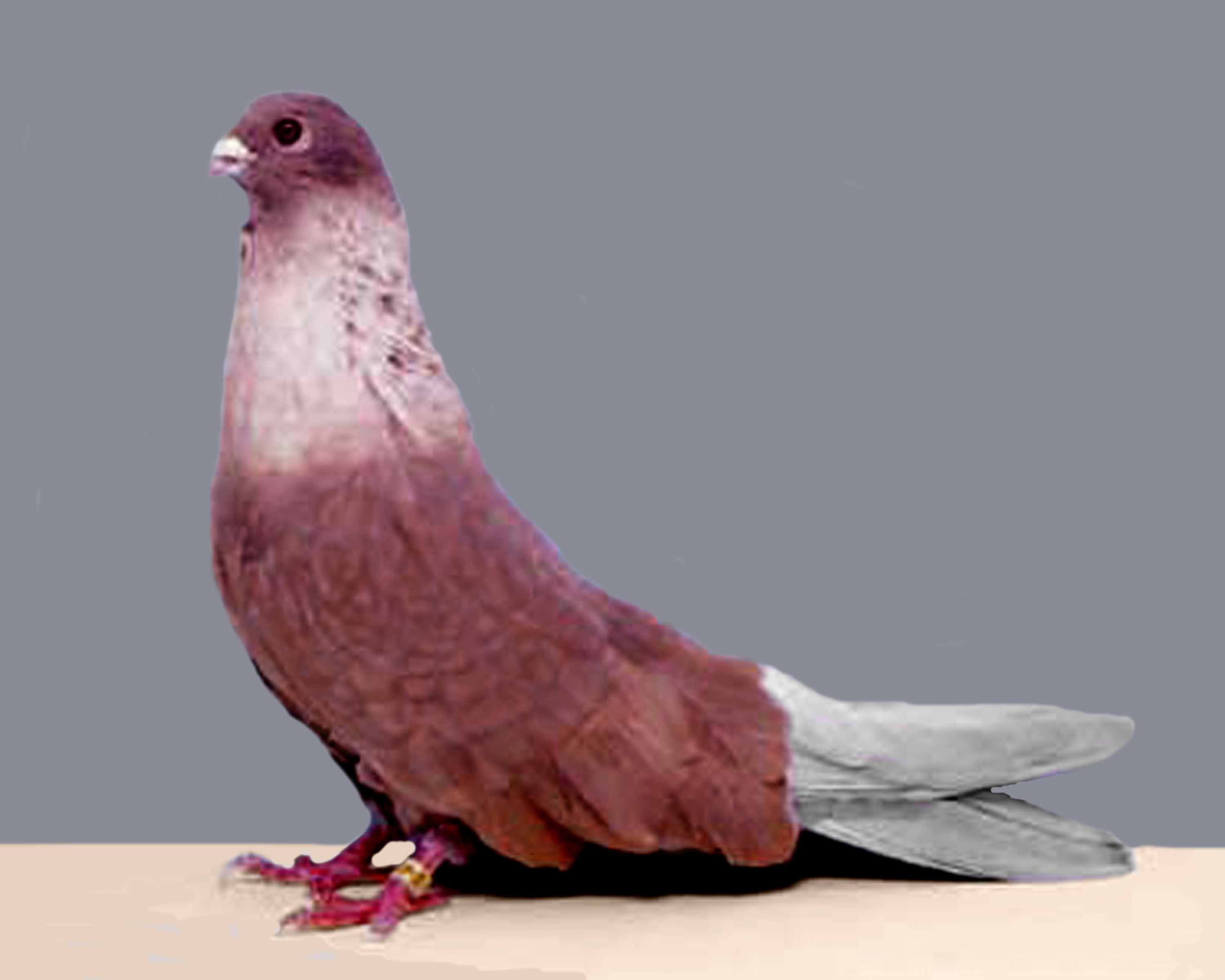
Red

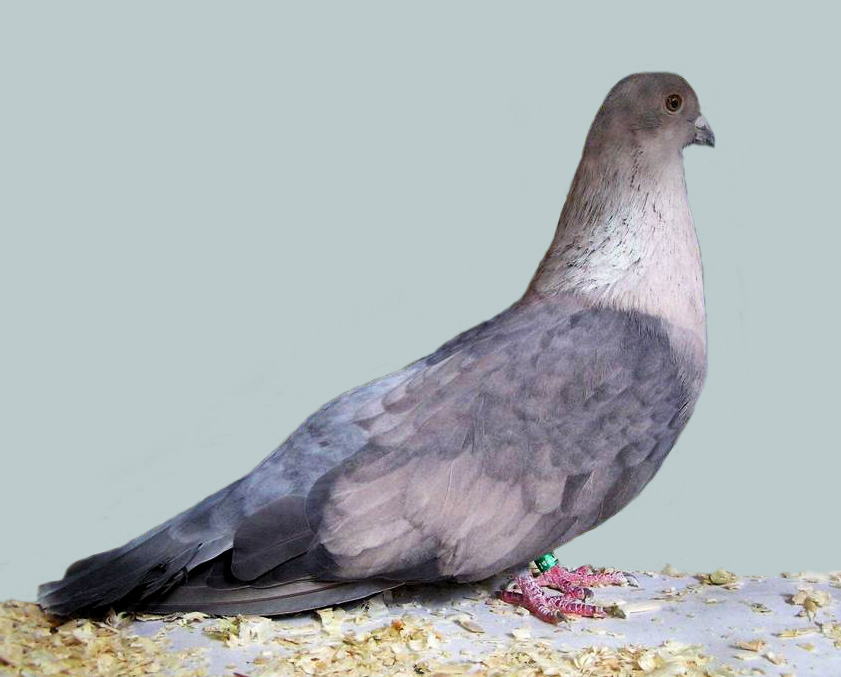
Gazaganti

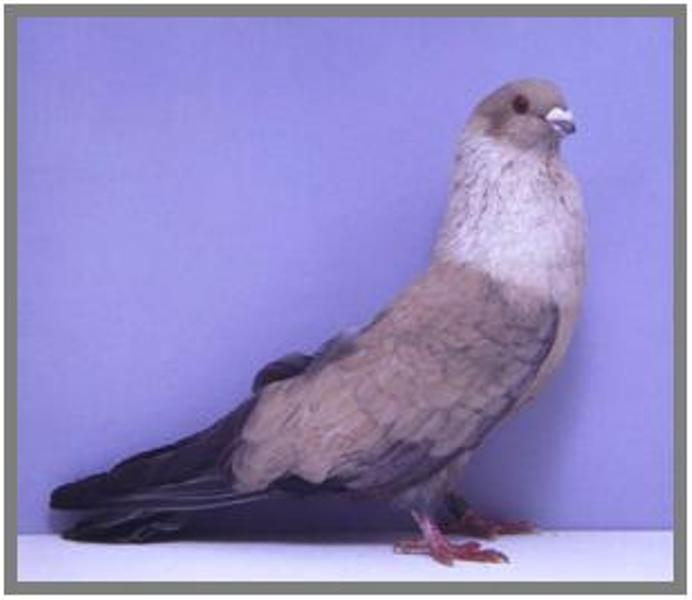
Egipski Barwy Ryani

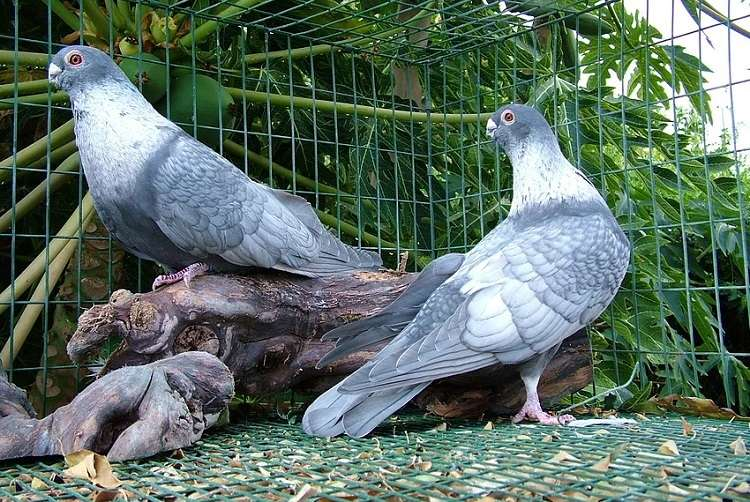
Otati YH

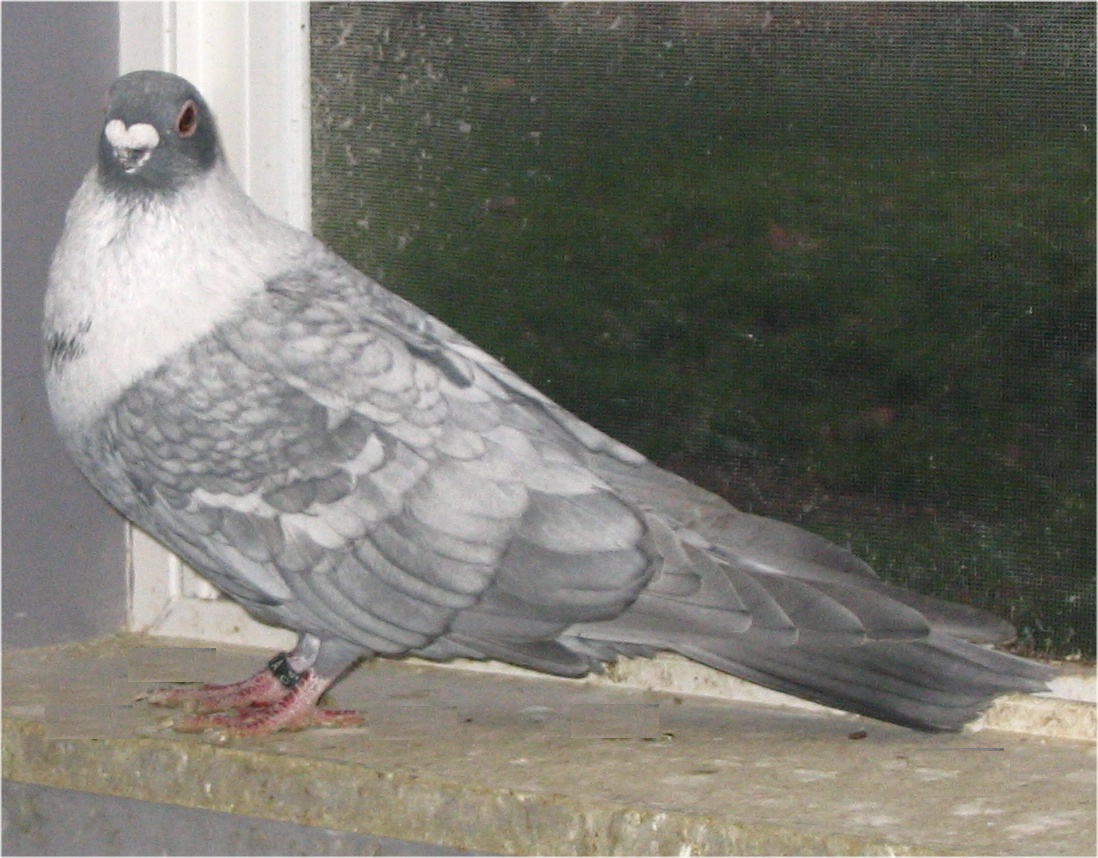
Ottati

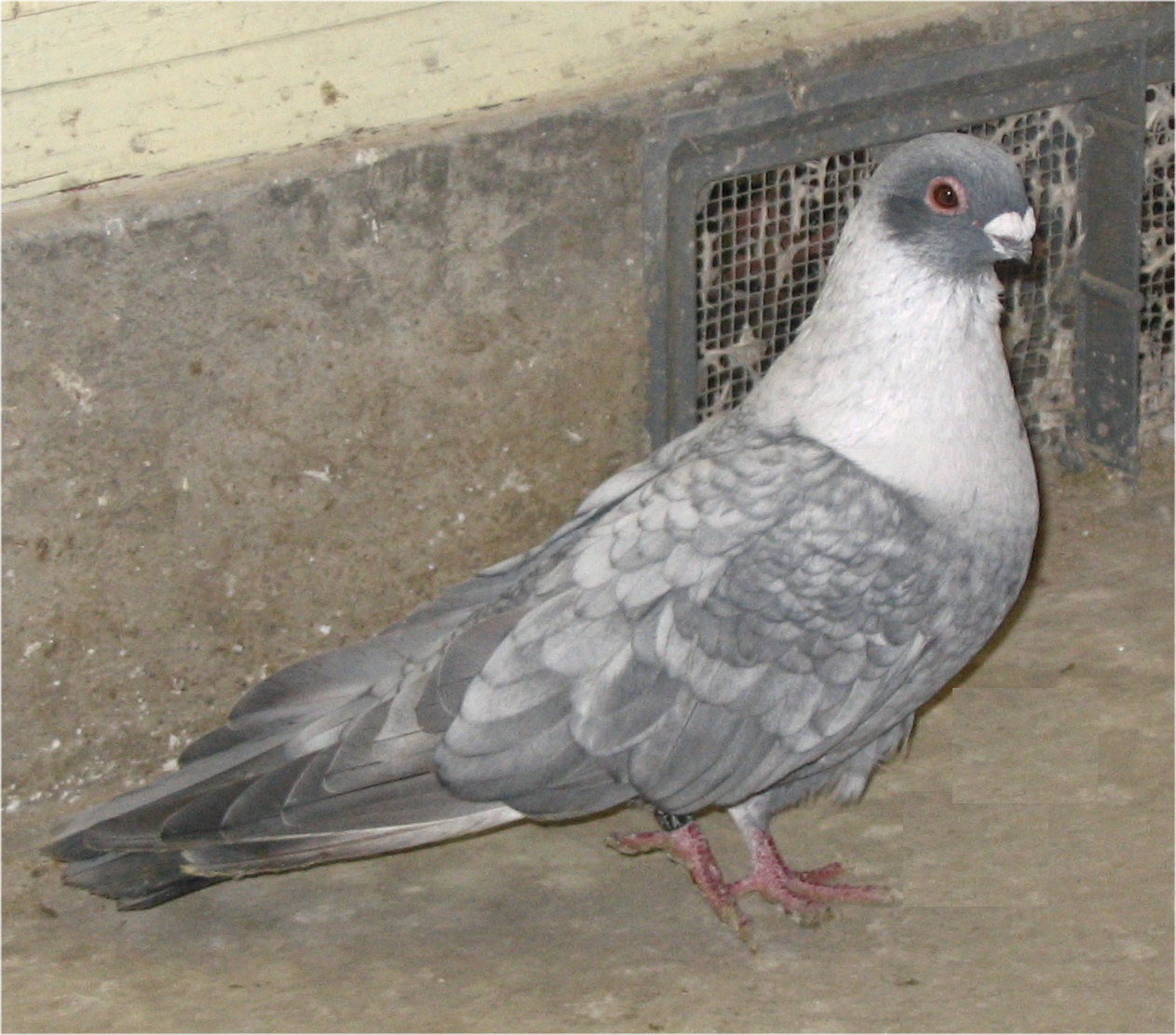
Ottati OC

== See also ==
- Pigeon Diet
- Pigeon Housing

American Pigeon Journal Nov. 1949

- List of pigeon breeds
