= Oriental Roller =

Breed of pigeon

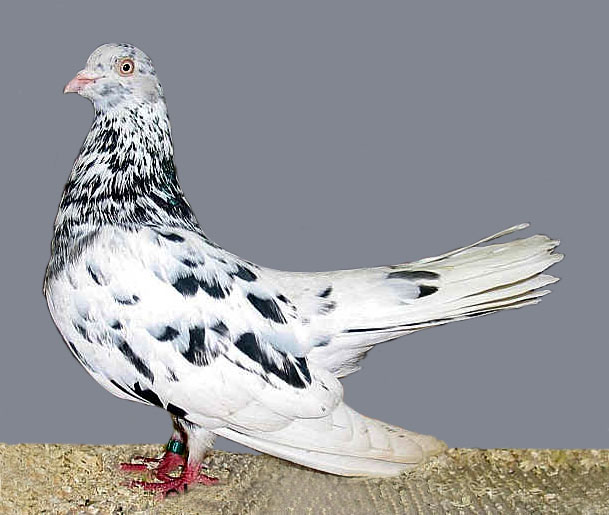
- Oriental Roller
- Conservation status: Common
- Other names: Flying Oriental Roller
- Country of origin: Middle East

Classification
- Australian Breed Group: Flying breed Group 7
- US Breed Group: Tumbler, Roller & Flying
- EE Breed Group: Tumbler and Highflyer

Notes
- The low carriage of the wings and high carriage of the tail are signatures of this breed.

The Oriental Roller is a breed of fancy pigeon developed over many years of selective breeding. Oriental Rollers, along with all other varieties of domesticated pigeons, are descended from the rock pigeon (Columba livia). They were developed in Germany but originated in the Middle East. They are the oldest known performing pigeons.

== Flying style ==
The key hallmark of the Oriental Roller is its flying style. They show a variety of different figures in the air, which are single somersaults, double somersaults, rolling (a number of uncountable somersaults), rotation with open wings, nose dives, sudden change of direction during flight and very rarely axial turns. Some breeds fly up to 1000 m high, others stay in the air for several hours.

The aerobatics that these Oriental Rollers perform are comparable to those of the Galatz Roller and Birmingham Roller pigeons.

Oriental Rollers are swift flyers and can fly for a few hours if trained.

== Characteristics ==
The head is rather long with a long straight beak and white eyes. Two of the unusual features is that the wings are carried below the tail, and that tail has between 14 and 20 feathers, making a slight arch.

Oriental Rollers have no oil glands at the roots of their tails, causing them to be loose-feathered compared to Birmingham Rollers. The breeds' squabs are hatched with little to no down on their bodies.

== Gallery ==
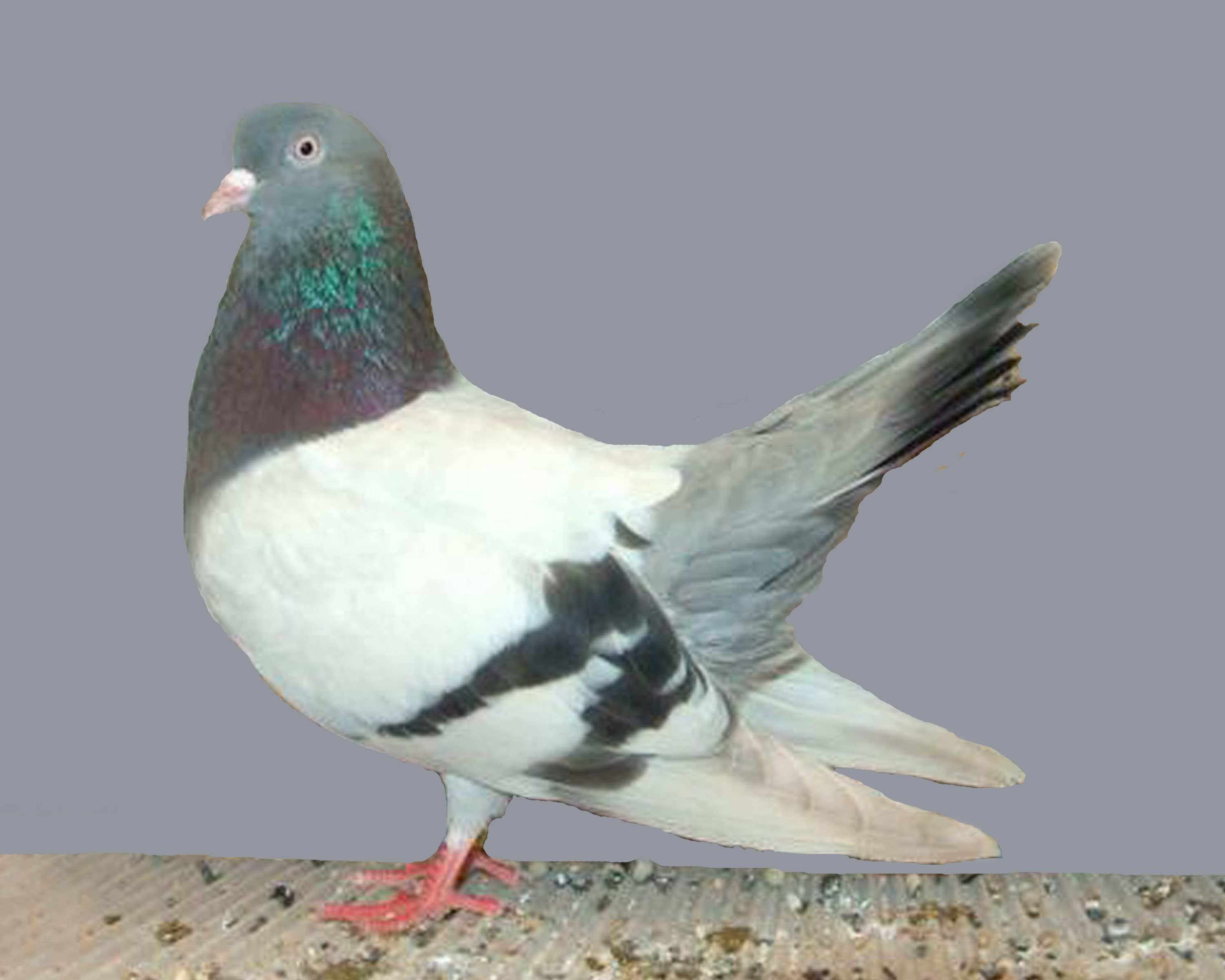
Blue bar Oriental Roller

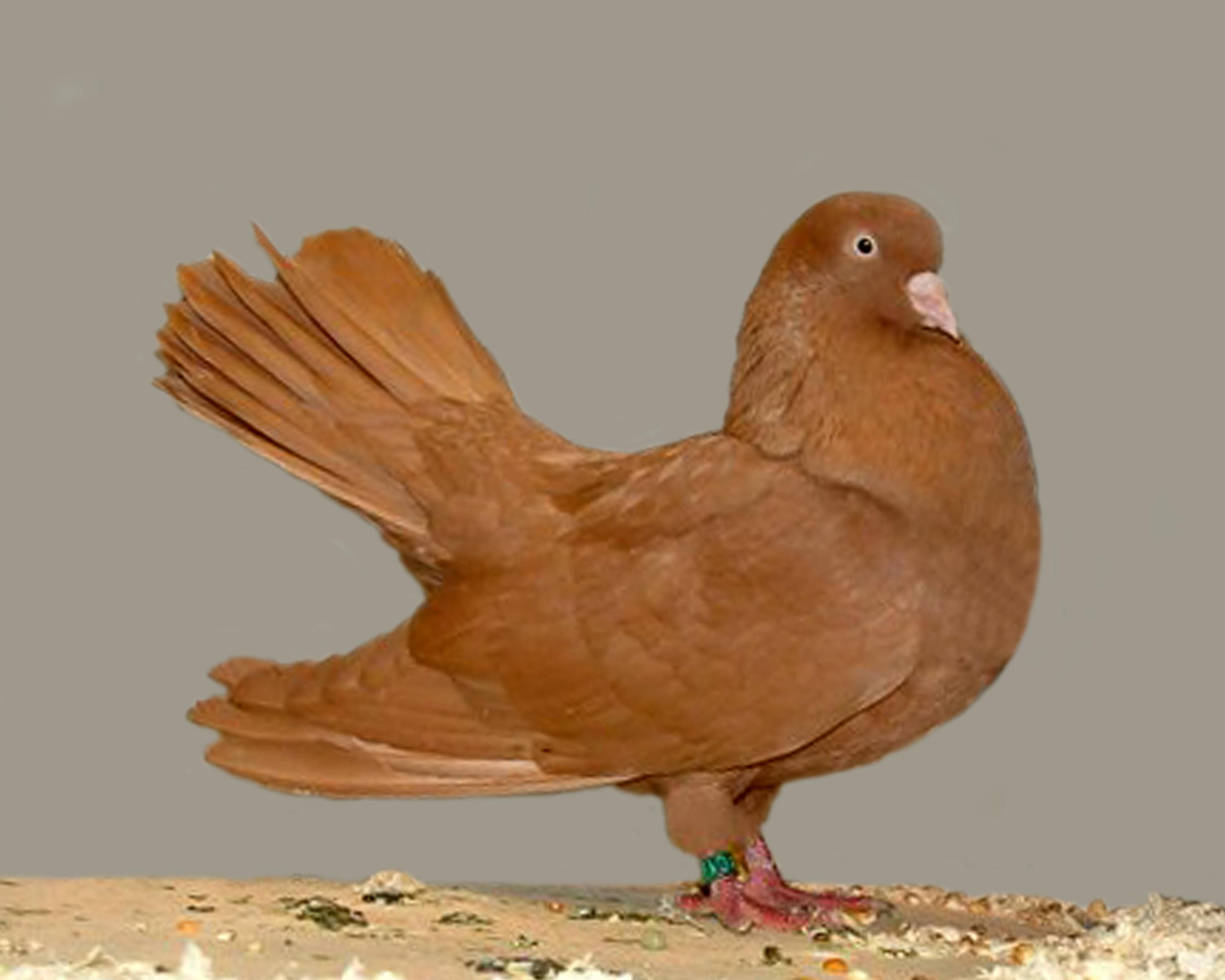
Yellow Oriental Roller

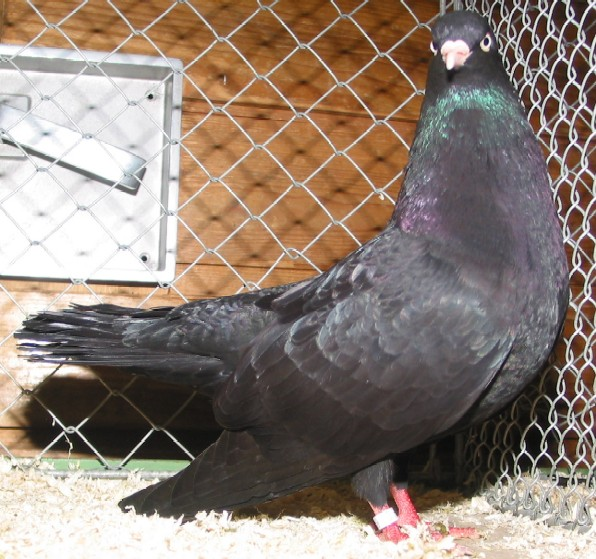
Black Oriental Roller

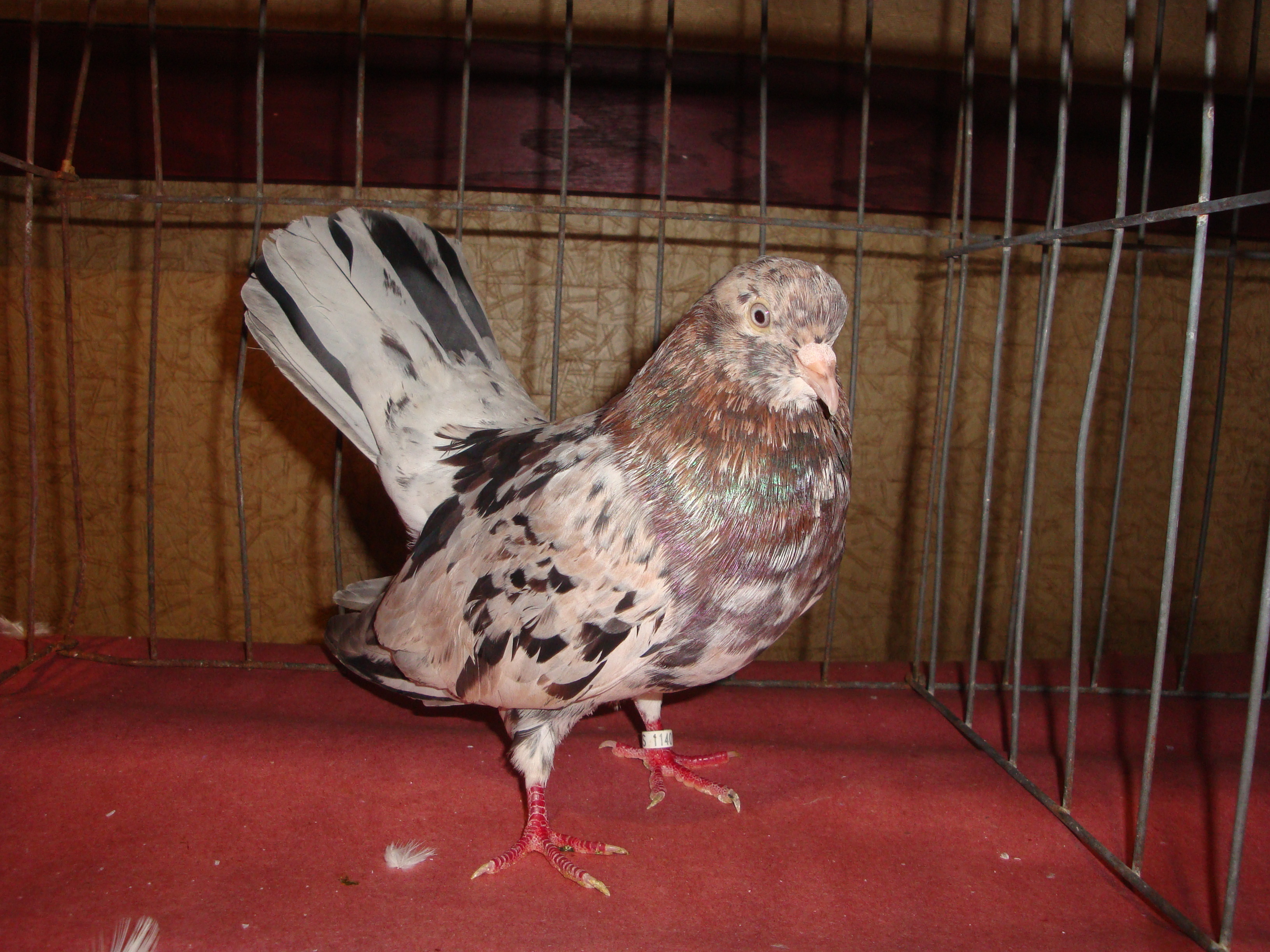
Almond Oriental Roller

== See also ==
- Pigeon Diet
- Pigeon Housing
- List of pigeon breeds
