= Galatz Roller =

Breed of pigeon

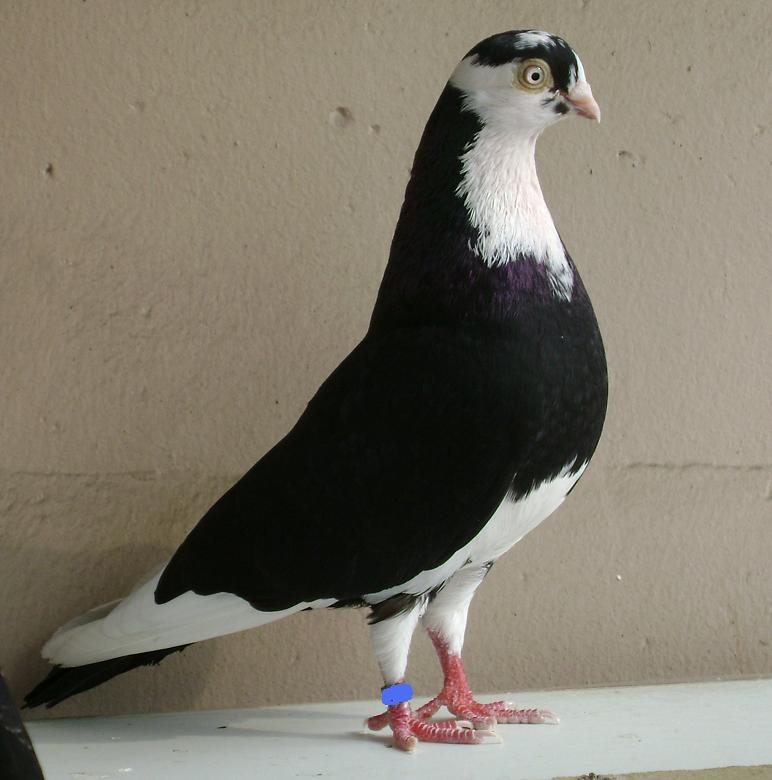
Galaţi Roller pigeon cock

The Galatz Roller or Galați Roller is a domesticated pigeon breed originating in Galați County, Romania. Because these pigeons perform air acrobatics when they fly, they became very popular among pigeon fanciers in both the country of origin and the rest of Europe, especially in Germany, the Netherlands and Belgium. The air acrobatics that these Galați Roller birds perform are comparable to those of the Oriental Roller and Birmingham Roller pigeons.

== Air acrobatics ==
The air acrobatics include:

- back somersaults (more than two consecutive back somersaults are called a "roll", hence the name "Galați Roller")
- pirouettes (turns around the vertical axis)
- screws (many pirouettes while flying downward)

The Galați Rollers have the "ro" gene, and the young birds learn to do the acrobatics by experience. At first they do pirouettes, then when they get stronger and fly around the loft, they ride on their tails (they glide with their wings shaped like the letter "V", leaning on their tails). Gradually, with practice, they lean more and more on their tails when they glide, and at some point they do the somersault. With time and practice, they learn how to roll (more successive somersaults). They must recover from their acrobatics and not hit the ground. There are pigeons that cannot control their rolls and will hit the ground. Such birds are called "bomber" or "kamikaze" and obviously do not have a long life expectancy.

With continuous exercise, they fly for about 30 minutes around their home loft (coop), while performing their acrobatic show, which is very tiring for them. Some fanciers train them to fly from a portable coop placed on a meadow, or in a park. There are also strains (lines), of this pigeon breed, which do not do air acrobatics but fly very high and very long, like a tippler. This high-flyer type (a new type) is more popular in Romania, whereas in Germany, the Netherlands and Belgium the roller-type (the old type) is preferred.

Pigeon clubs in Europe organize contests where the acrobatics that the pigeons do in a specific amount of time are counted. Every fancier registers to the contest with his trained team of pigeons. This team is called a kit and usually consists of 3 pigeons. The fancier whose pigeons do the most acrobatics during the specified time frame (i.e. 30 minutes) wins the contest. There are two types of contest: from the home loft and from the portable coop.

In the home loft contest, the jury goes to the fancier's pigeon loft. The fancier lets his kit of pigeon fly and the judges count the acrobatics per 30-minute interval. Then the judges go to the next fancier in the contest and so on. In the portable coop contest, all contestants with their portable coops and pigeons and the judges meet on a meadow where the fanciers, in turn, let their kit of pigeons fly. The rules of the portable coop contest are the same as those of the home loft contest.

To cause the kit of pigeons to come down, from their flight, either an acoustic signal, a visual signal or a dropper pigeon is used. Every fancier trains his pigeons to come down using his chosen signal. Basically the pigeons are trained to associate the signal with feeding time. They typically must be well-trained and hungry in order to come down when the signal is given.

== Body and appearance ==
The body of such a pigeon is compact, with a round breast, short legs and short neck. The beak is medium-sized. The average weight of such pigeons is around 300 grams (0.7 lb). Because of the compact body, in pictures, the Galați Roller looks bigger than it actually is. Compared to a racing homer, this roller pigeon is obviously smaller.

The Galați Roller comes in very many different colors, mostly as white-flight-pied (pied, with white wing tips):

- blue bar white-flight-pied
- diluted blue bar white-flight-pied
- black white-flight-pied
- yellow white-flight-pied
- red white-flight-pied

The white color spread on the head and body of a pied Galați Roller is irregular, but there are pigeon fanciers who prefer a white belly and a white throat. There are also plain-feathered Galați Rollers: white, black, red, yellow and blue bar. The variation in feather color helps the pigeon fancier and the contest jury to identify the pigeons during their flight.

The feathering is rich, thereby helping the pigeons withstand the low temperatures in winter.

A very spectacular trait of this pigeon is also the fact that the males (the cocks), besides normal cooing, open up their wings in a V-shape, spread their tail feathers and swallow a little air (but not as much as cropper pigeons) in order to either impress the hens or intimidate the other males.

These roller pigeons are prolific breeders. As soon as the squabs in the nest are over a week old, the parents mate again and, after about another week, then the hen lays eggs again.

== See also ==
- List of pigeon breeds
