= Parlor Roller =

Breed of pigeon

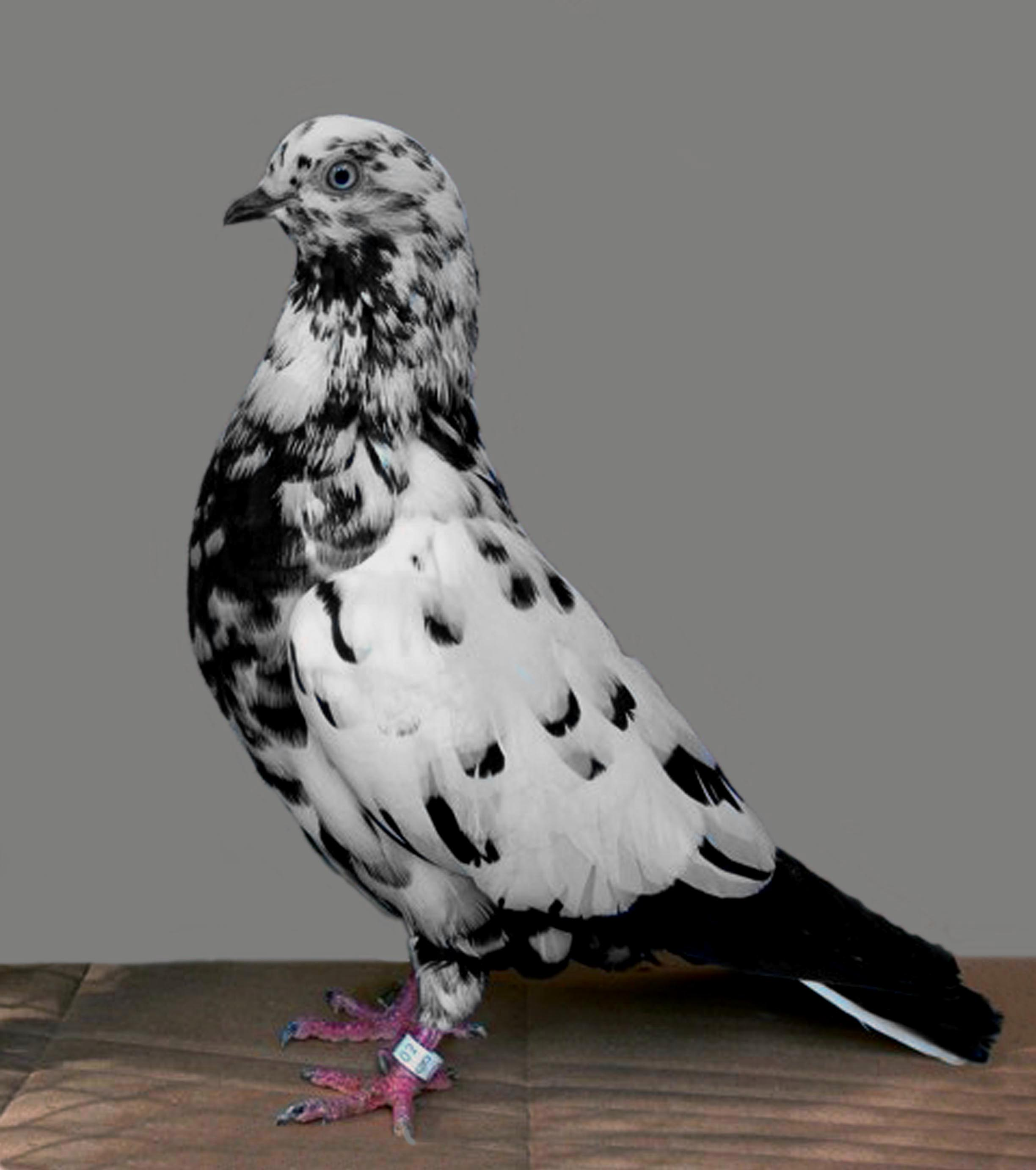
- Black Tigered Parlor Roller
- Conservation status: Common
- Country of origin: Scotland

Classification
- US Breed Group: Fancy

Notes
- Parlor Rollers generally lose the ability to fly after they reach maturity

The Parlor Roller is a breed of domesticated pigeon developed over many years of selective breeding. Parlor Rollers, along with other varieties of domesticated pigeons, are all descendants from the rock pigeon (Columba livia). The breed is known for its unique performance of turning somersaults on the ground. Parlor Rollers are considered to be further development from the Parlor Tumbler.

Although adult parlor rollers seem to lack the capability of flight, they are generally grouped in the Flying/Sporting group of pigeons by fanciers in the United States. This is because parlor roller competitions are based almost solely on the distance that the animal rolls on the ground and the appearance of the animal is a secondary consideration.

== Gallery ==
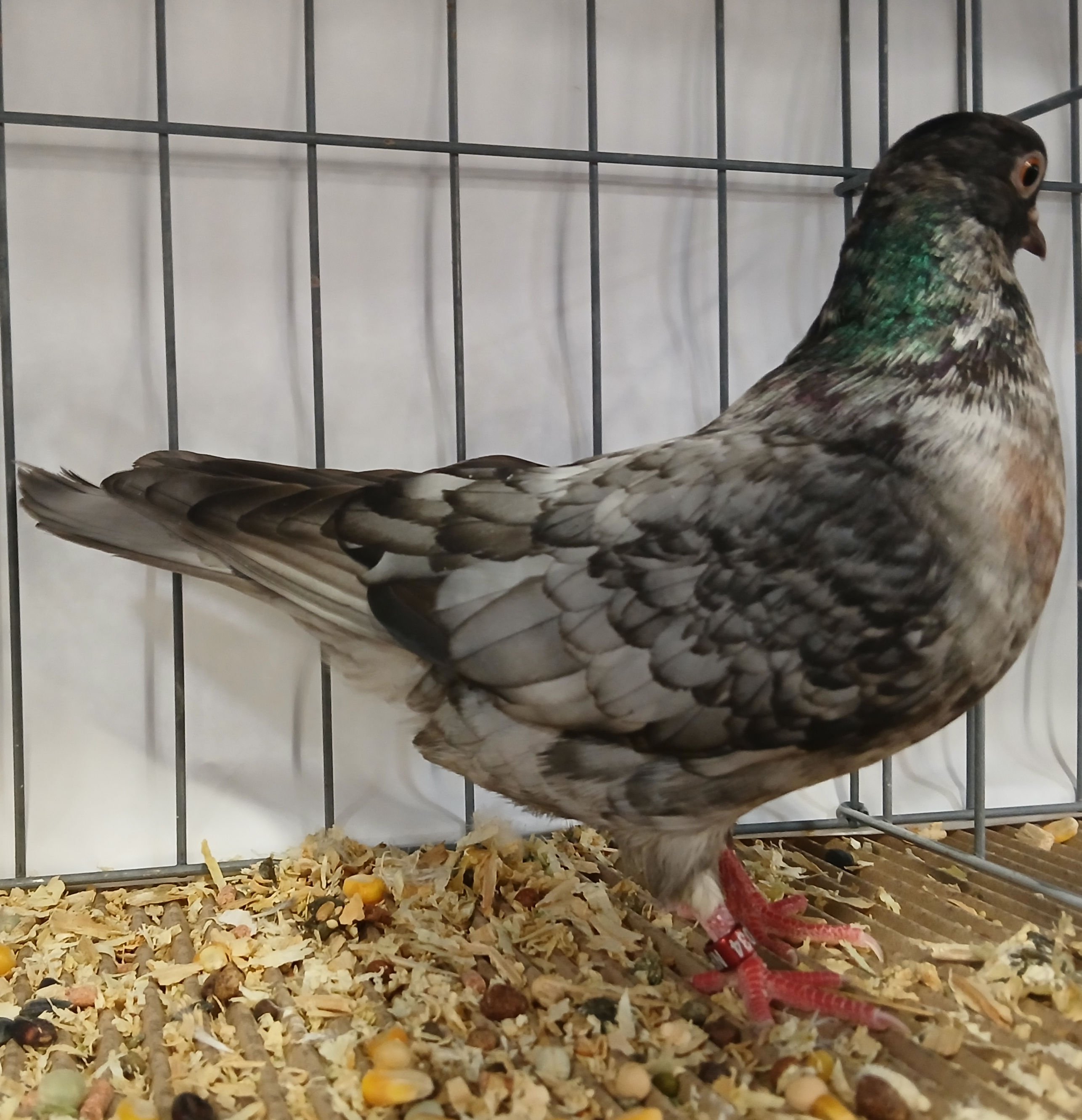
Almond

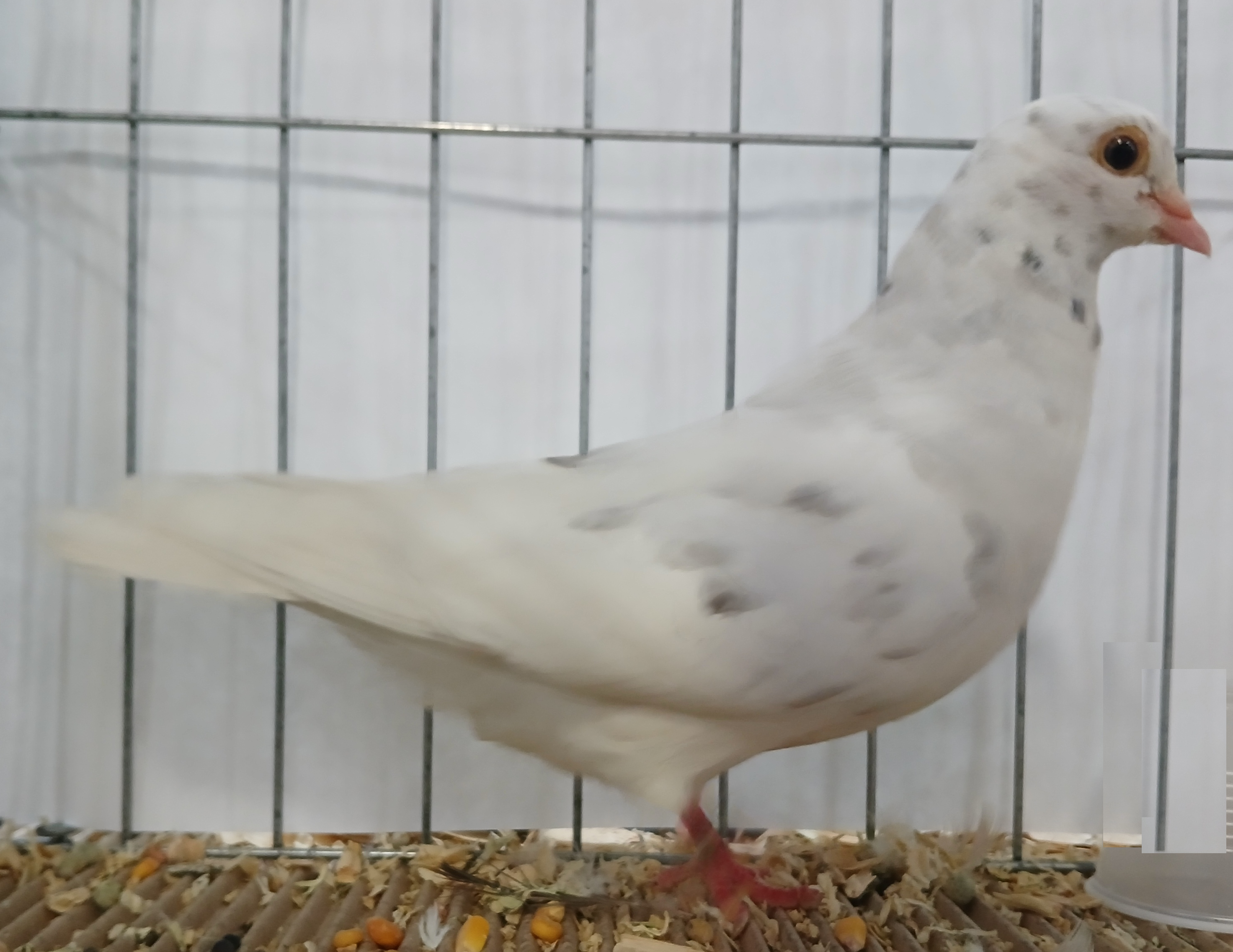
White grizzle

== See also ==
- Pigeon Diet
- Pigeon Housing
- List of pigeon breeds
- Roller (pigeon)
