= Pigeon keeping =

Animal husbandry of domestic pigeons

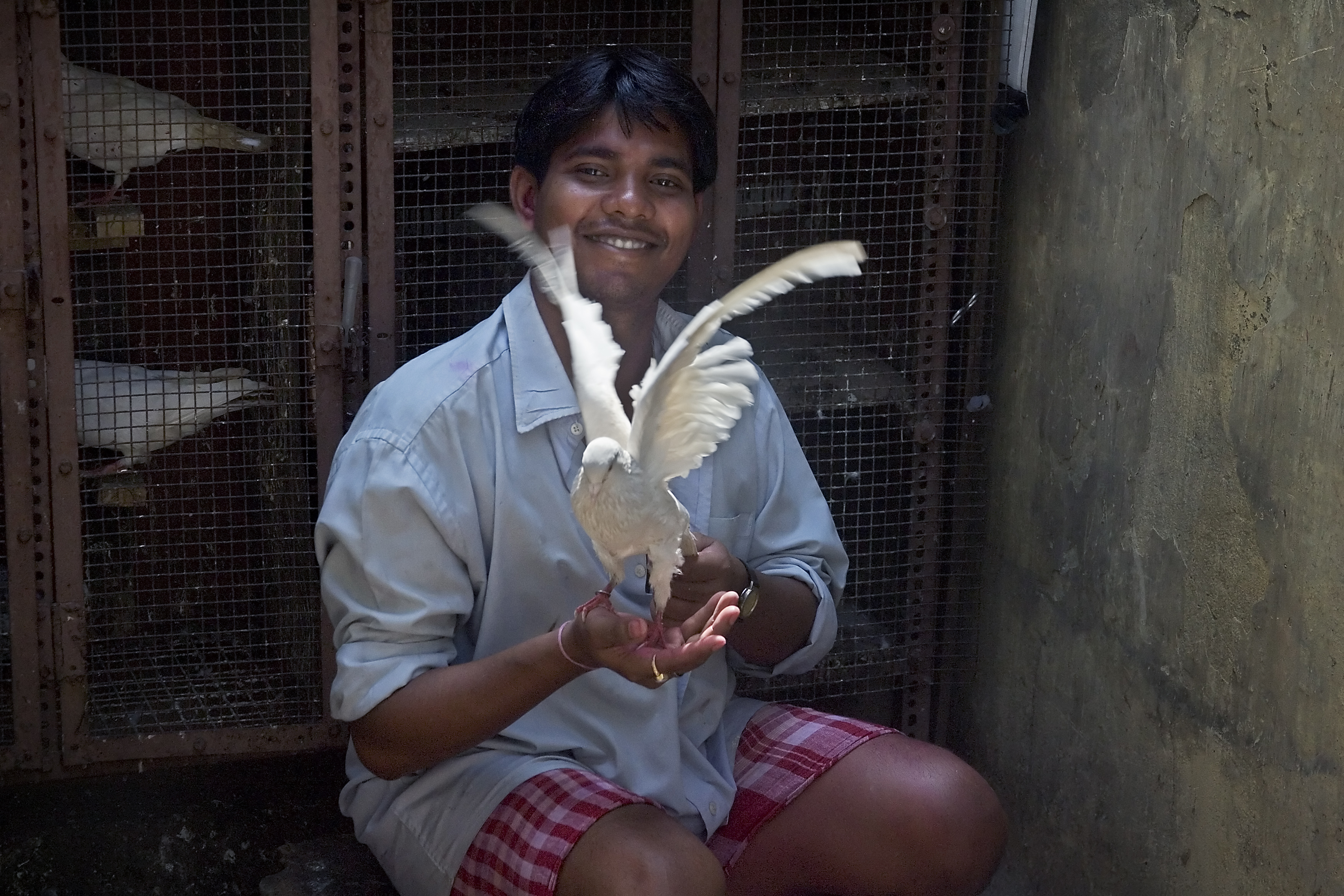
A pigeon fancier

Pigeon keeping or pigeon fancying is the art and science of breeding domestic pigeons. People have practiced pigeon keeping for at least 5,000 years and in almost every part of the world. In that time, humans have substantially altered the morphology and the behaviour of the domesticated descendants of the rock dove to suit their needs for food, aesthetic satisfaction and entertainment.

People who breed pigeons are commonly referred to as pigeon fanciers. The hobby is gaining in popularity in the United States, after having waned within the last 50 years. Both the hobby and commercial aspects of keeping pigeons are thriving in other parts of the world.

== Types of pigeons kept ==
The rock dove, the wild ancestor of domestic pigeons, was domesticated at least five thousand years ago, when it is first mentioned in historical records from Mesopotamia. There are hundreds of breeds of domesticated pigeons arising from this common ancestor which are currently cultivated by pigeon fanciers. Because of the large number of domesticated breeds, pigeon fanciers find it convenient for certain purposes to group sets of domesticated pigeons into larger groups.

In the United States and United Kingdom, there are three major recognized groups of breeds of domesticated pigeons:

- Flying/Sporting
- Fancy
- Utility

Pigeon fanciers in other nations use different schemes in grouping domesticated pigeons; for example, a nationwide pigeon organization in Germany uses a far different grouping scheme. The Australian grouping system is similar to the UK/European groupings. For example, see: Major breed families of fancy pigeon.

=== Flying/Sporting pigeons ===
These pigeons are kept and bred for their aerial performance and for reproduction. Racing homers are a type of homing pigeon, trained to participate in the sport of pigeon racing, and have been used to carry messages during times of war. Such races often have large cash prizes of up to $1 million as the Sun City Million Dollar Pigeon Race. Fanciers who fly racing pigeons sometimes win long-distance races and even break records. Other flying/sporting pigeons are bred for unique flying characteristics other than homing, such as rolling, high-flying, and diving. These birds, which may be flown in competitions, include but are not limited to Rollers, Tumblers, and Tipplers. A few varieties, for example, the Parlor Roller, are considered to be within the flying/sporting group even though they do not fly. This is because they compete on the basis of their performance and not their appearance. Competitors in pigeon sporting competitions such as pigeon races can win large sums of prize money when their pigeons return home the fastest from a race. The use of pigeons to carry messages is commonly called pigeon post. Pigeons can also carry small light-weight packages, and have been used to smuggle drugs into a prison.

=== Fancy pigeons ===
Fancy pigeons are pigeons which are specially bred to perpetuate particular features. Examples of fancy pigeons would include Jacobins, Fantails and Pigmy Pouters. Their owners compete them against each other at exhibitions or pigeon shows and judges decide who has the best by comparing them to each other and their respective breed standard. There are many breeds of fancy pigeons of all sizes, colors and types.

=== Utility pigeons ===
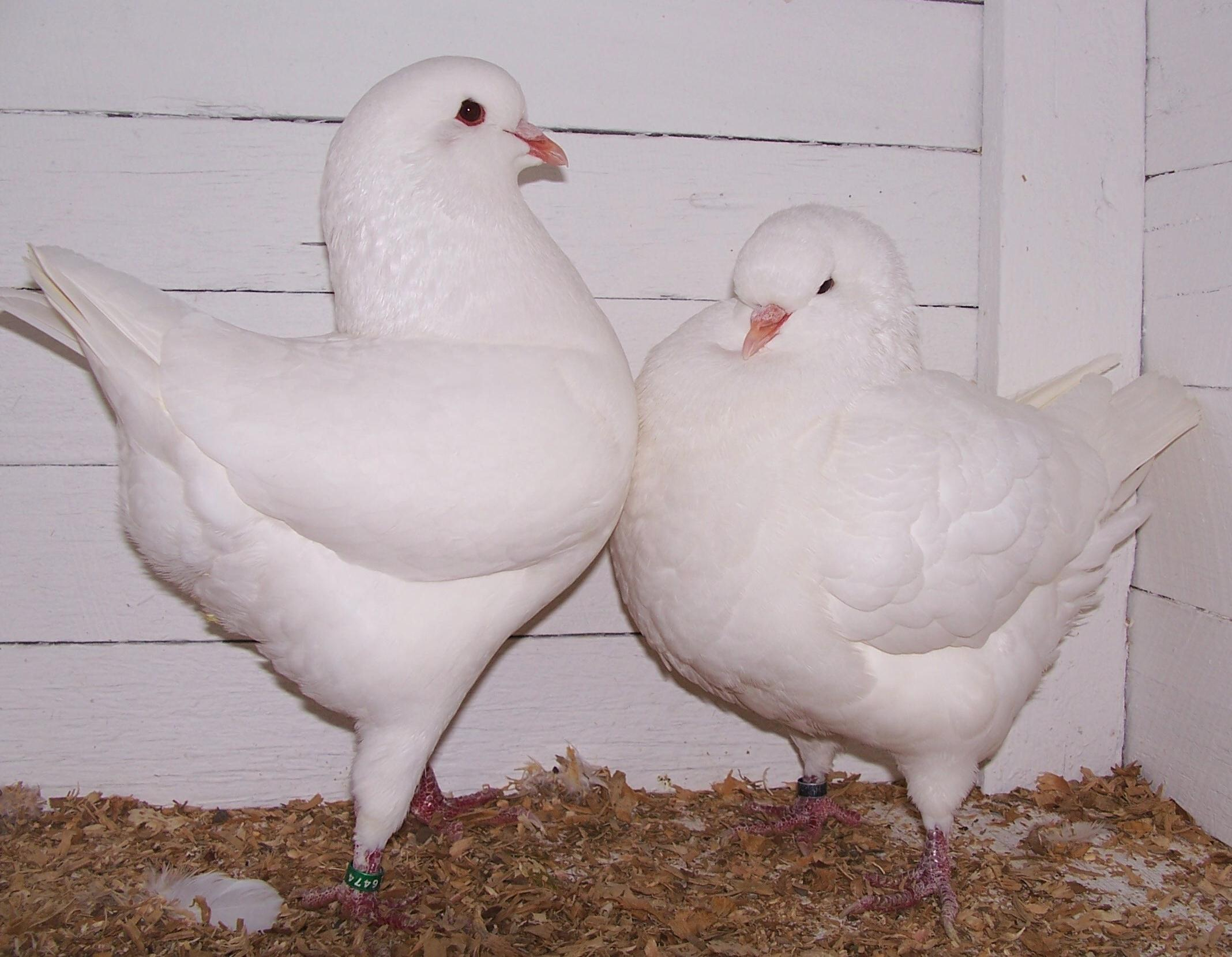
A pair of White Kings

Utility pigeons are bred for their meat and as replacement breeding stock. The meat of pigeons is customarily referred to as squab and is considered a delicacy in many parts of the world. Examples of utility varieties include King pigeons, several different varieties of Mondaines and Carneau.

- All of the above pigeon breeds may also be exhibited in pigeon shows but true utility pigeons and flying/sporting pigeons are rarely exhibited. This is because true utility pigeons are bred for meat and true flying/sporting pigeons are bred for their aerial performance so that in both cases appearance is usually a very minor consideration.

== Pigeon diet ==
The nutritional requirements of doves and pigeons are easily provided. In general, doves require a fairly high fiber diet of grains and seeds. A protein content of 14% is desirable but they will do well on diets containing 12-18% protein. Grains most commonly fed include millet, corn, wheat, milo as well as peas and safflower. Numerous commercial seed mixes are available and are normally fed once or twice daily.

Doves and pigeons also need a source of grit and oyster shell. The shell provides calcium and phosphorus and the grit aids in the digestion of the seed. The water must be changed on a daily basis and the water vessels disinfected weekly. Pigeons suck water to drink, as you do with a straw. A container with at least one inch or more of free standing water is perfect.

== Pigeon housing ==
Houses for pigeons are generally called lofts. Pigeon houses are also sometimes referred to as "coops" although the word seems to have originally applied to the breeding pens inside the housing. They are also referred to as pigeon duckets in North East England. There are as many different kinds of enclosures used to house pigeons in as there are pigeon fanciers. There are no real constraints on the design of housing for pigeons, but they should be housed appropriately. These houses are constructed to keep the pigeons safe from predators and inclement weather and give them nesting places in which to raise their squabs.

The loft must provide at least 11 square feet for each bird. This means that a loft of 6x6x6 feet will house about 20 birds. There should be at least two perches per bird and two nest boxes per pair.

But there are some things that most fanciers find desirable.

These pigeon houses often contain specially constructed openings to allow the pigeon keeper to give his animals liberty for purposes of exercise while allowing them to re-enter the house without special assistance from the keeper.

=== Multiple pens ===
Many pigeon fanciers build their pigeon loft with at least two pens. This allows a few positive outcomes for the pigeon fancier:

1. They are able to separate their males from females in order to control breeding.
2. They are able to separate young, unmated pigeons from mated and settled pairs. This allows the mated and settled pairs to breed better.

Most fanciers have at least two pens for their pigeons and often fanciers have more than two pens or possibly multiple pigeon lofts. Because it can be difficult to determine the sex of a young pigeon it is also handy to have extra pens for pigeons that have been weaned but which have not given external indications of their sex yet.

=== Trap/landing board ===
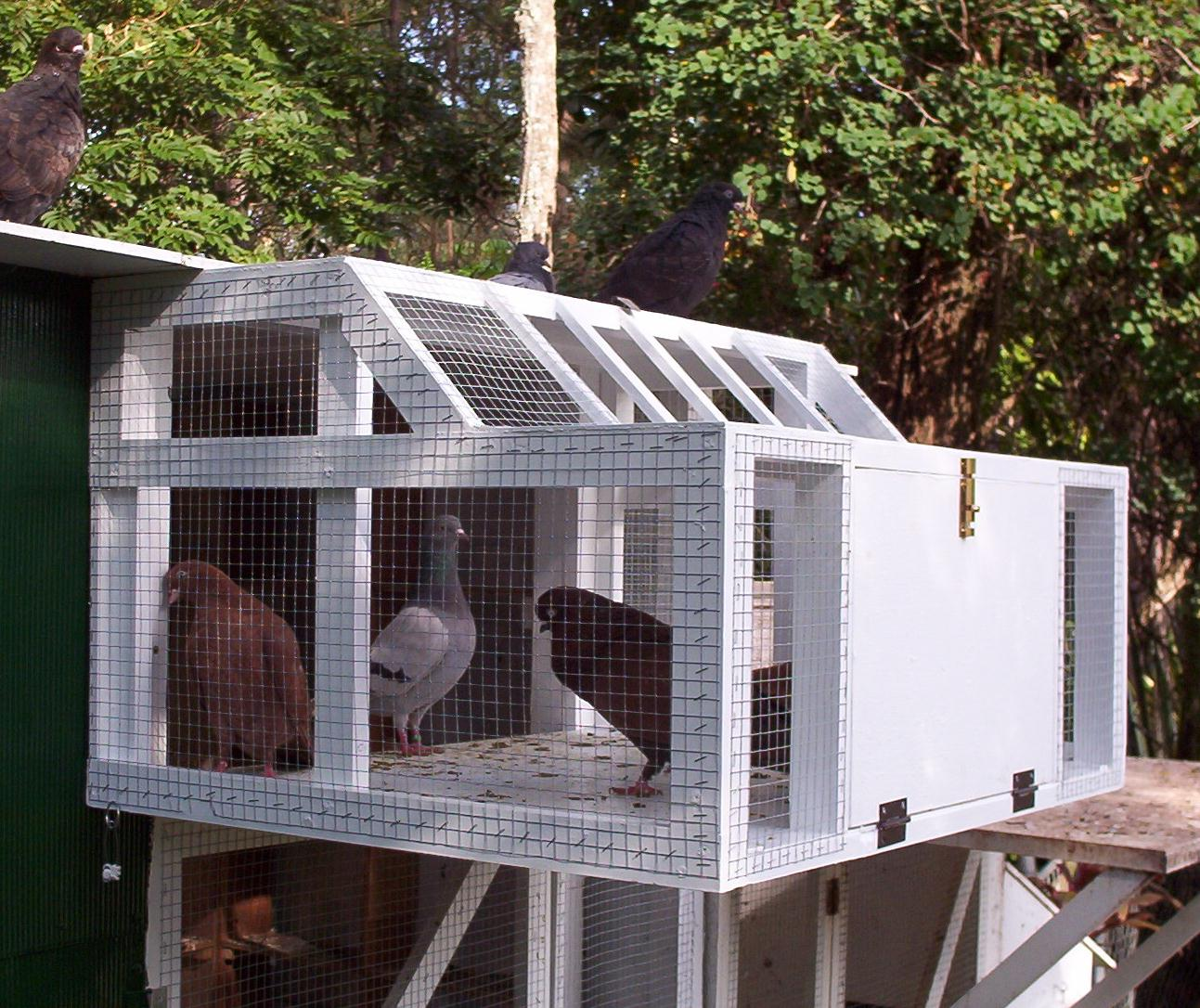
A Sputnik trap.

For those pigeon fanciers that fly their pigeons (not all pigeon fanciers allow their pigeons to fly freely outside of their aviary) the pigeons need a means of ingress to the loft. A trap or at least bobs and landing board allows the pigeon to get back into their home when they are ready to do so. There are different variations of trap and bobs used. Racing pigeons are commonly trapped home using a bob wired trapping arrangement that the birds push against the bob wires to gain access, but are restricted by the wires when trying to get back outside. Another form of trap typically called a Sputnik trap (pictured) uses openings set on an angle which are just wide enough for one bird to gain access by dropping through into the loft.

=== Flypen ===
Sometimes pigeon fanciers cannot allow their birds complete liberty due to complaints of neighbors. However, pigeons have much better health and seem to be in much better spirits when they're given room to fly. So most fanciers, including those that let their birds fly, will build a large enclosed area free of obstacles where the pigeons can fly as freely as they wish. This is usually referred to as a flypen.

=== Nest boxes ===
Pigeon fanciers will often provide their mated pairs with nest boxes in which to build their nests. Because pigeons are quite territorial about their nesting area pigeons co-exist much more harmoniously when each mated pair has two nest boxes of its own.

=== Perches ===
Again, pigeon fanciers often provide their birds (both mated and unmated pigeons) with more perches than the birds need. Because pigeons are also quite territorial about their perch it is best to ensure that every pigeon in the loft has many places to perch.

Pigeon fanciers often have their pigeon lofts in suitably modified garden sheds. In Glasgow and other areas of Scotland there has been a tradition of pigeon keepers building their own freestanding urban pigeon lofts, or doocots, standing about 4m high in areas of waste ground close to housing estates. In New York City, pigeon fanciers often build pigeon lofts on the roof of the building.

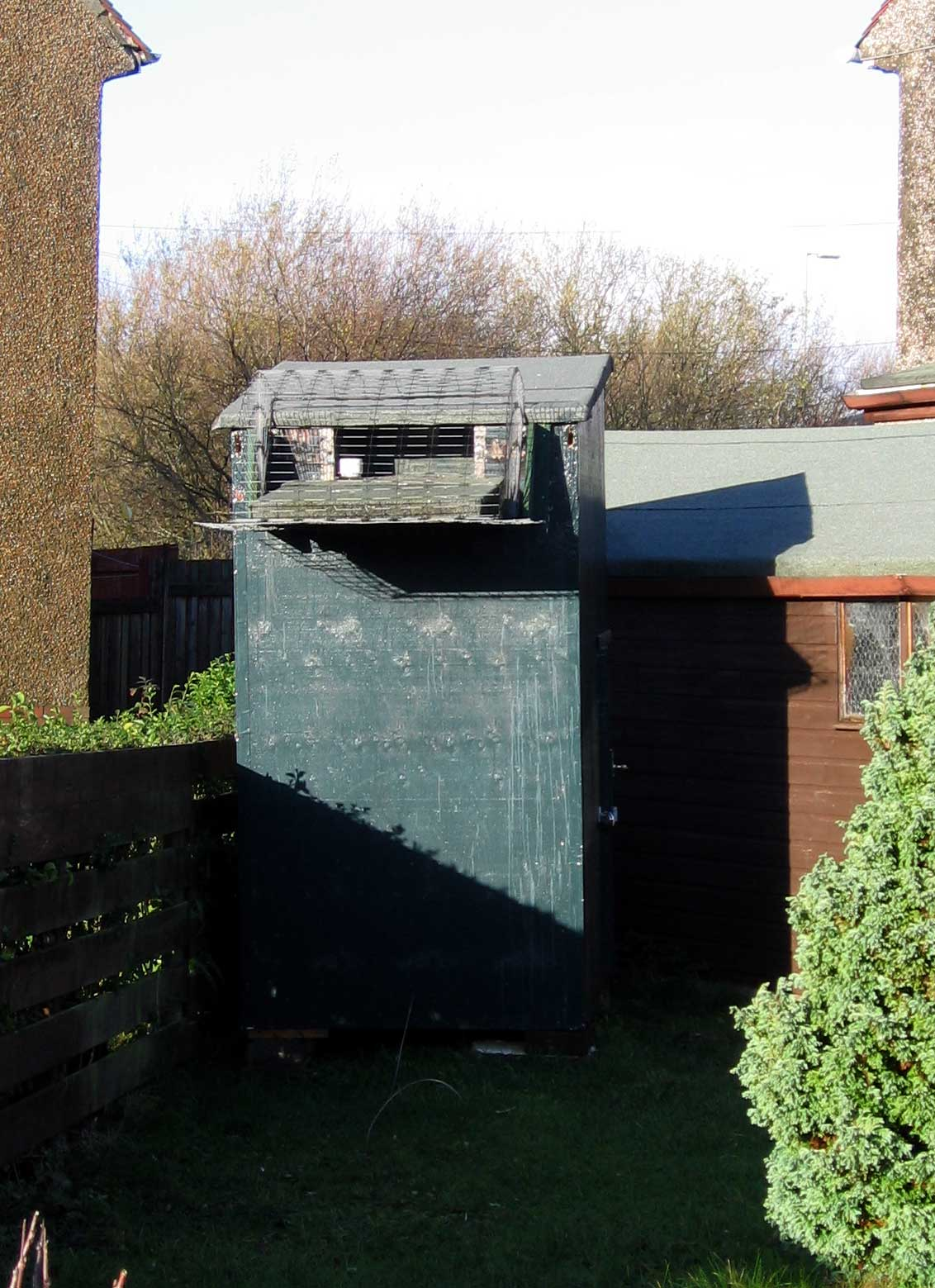
Pigeon loft in a garden.

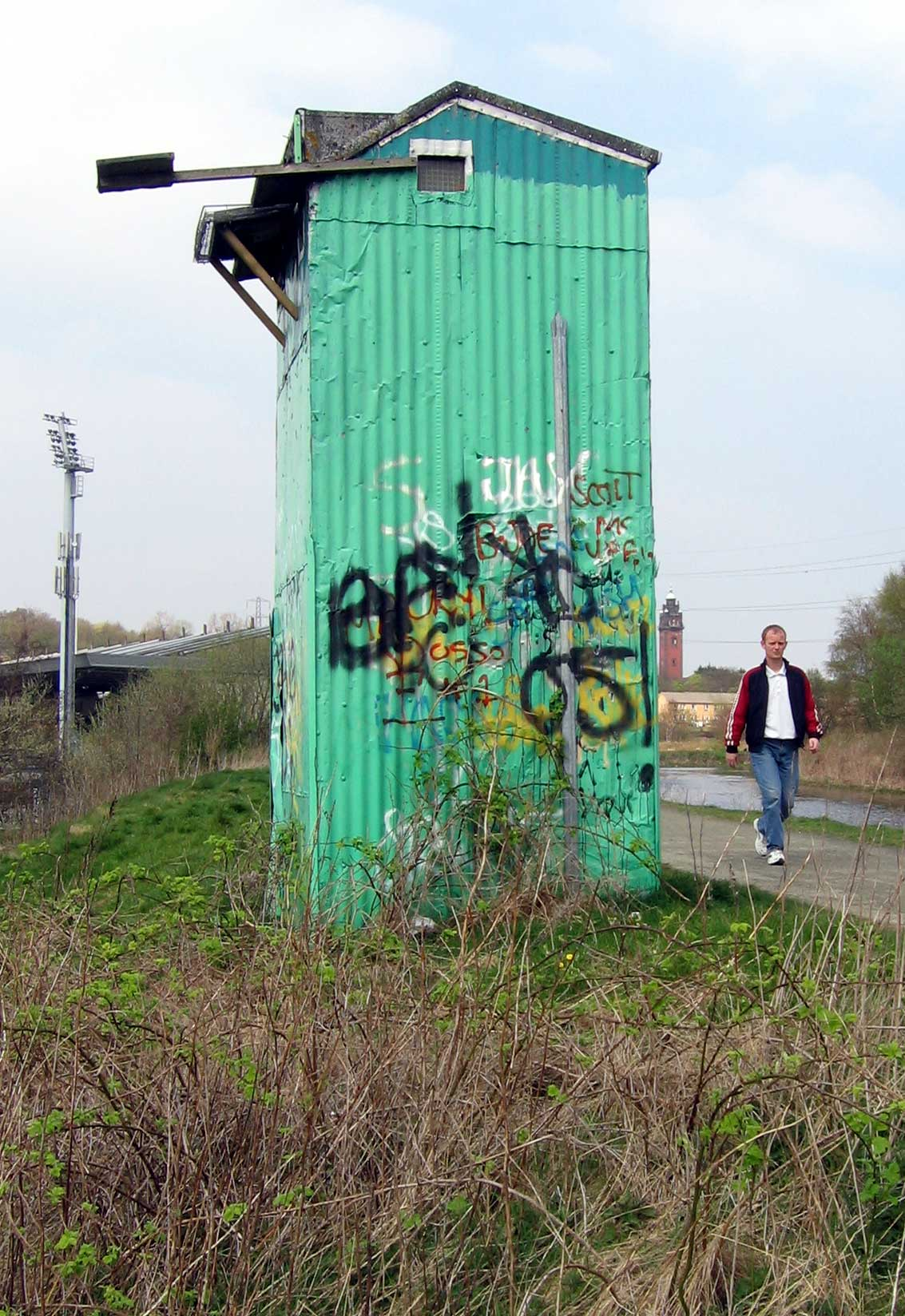
Glasgow doocot.

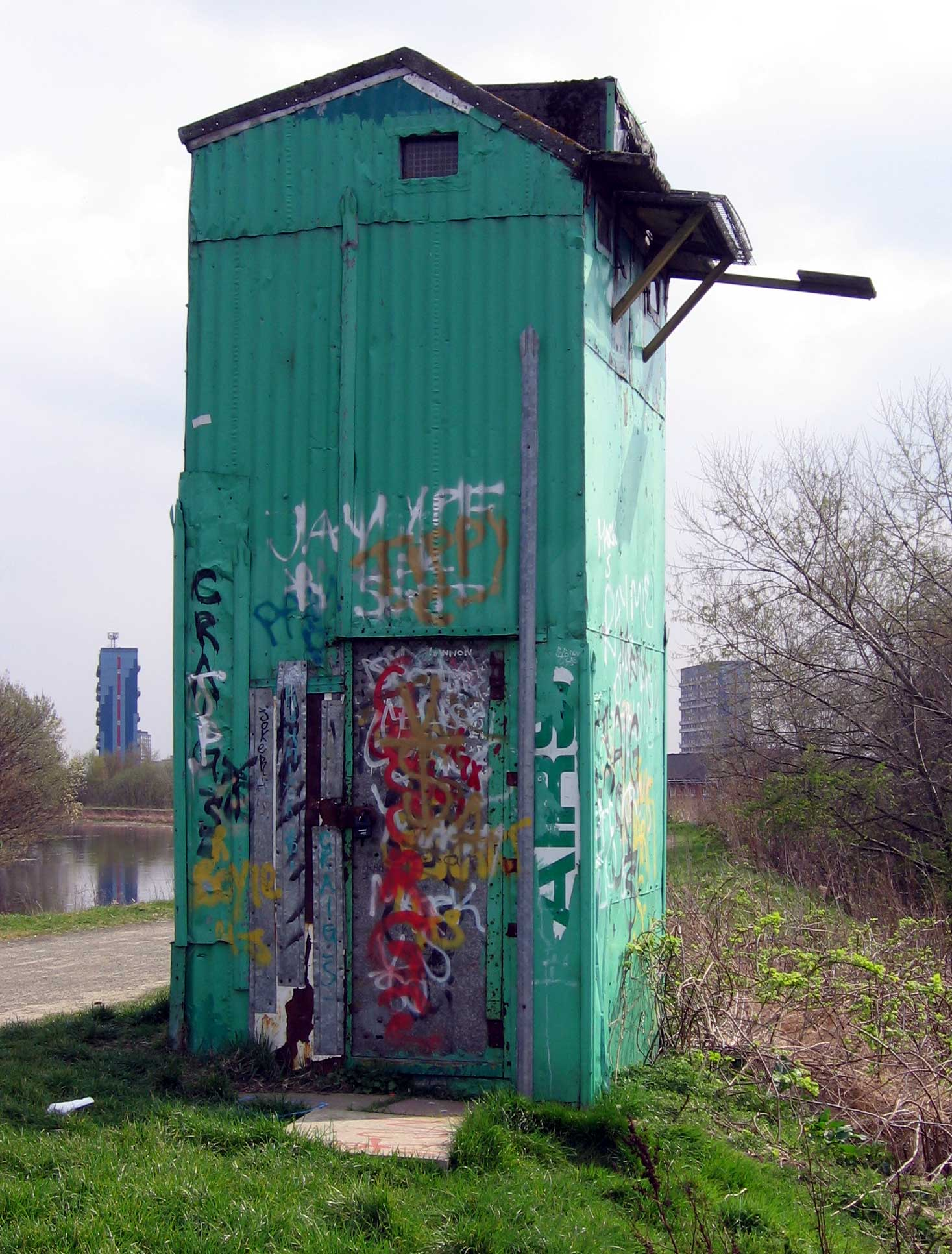
Entrance door.

== Portrayal in the arts ==
There have been several portrayals of pigeon keeping and pigeon fanciers in the arts. One of the more famous portrayals of this hobby was in the film On The Waterfront where the main character, Terry Malloy, is a pigeon keeper. In the film Ghost Dog, the title character is a hitman who communicates only using homing pigeons.

There have been portrayals of pigeon keeping in other art forms as well. The artist Zina Saunders has painted portraits of New York pigeon keepers as part of her Overlooked New York project. Photographer Zak Waters shot a black and white project documenting the lives of pigeon fanciers in the UK called Birdmen. Sydney-based photographer Ho Hai Tran recently debuted his work On Pigeons which chronicled more than a year spent with the Pigeon Fanciers Society of New South Wales in Australia. The work was also exhibited in early 2013 in a show entitled Fancy which showcased portraits of some of the most notable fancy breeds including the Pouter, Jacobin, King and Dragoon. In the musical The Producers, the deranged ex-Nazi named Franz Liebkind, who writes the fictitious play Springtime for Hitler, is a pigeon fancier.

The British visual and performance artist, Victoria Melody, investigated pigeon fanciers to create a 2009 exhibition, Demographics of a Pigeon Fancier, and a 2012 theatre show, Northern Soul. The projects were the result of months spent living with British pigeon fanciers during the racing season.

On the U.S. television show NYPD Blue, Detective Bobby Simone raised pigeons. Several episodes featured Simone tending to his pigeons on the roof of his home.

The novel Young Mungo's character James is a Catholic Glaswegian boy who has built a dovecote behind his flat. There is some discussion of the Glaswegian community of pigeon fanciers and the competition between them.

== Origins of commercial pigeon keeping ==
Since their initial domestication by people, pigeons have been seen as a cheap source of good meat. The Romans certainly kept pigeons for food as evidenced by the fact that they were familiar with the practice of force-feeding squabs in order to fatten the young pigeons faster. Pigeons were especially prized because they would produce fresh meat during the winter months when larger animals were unavailable as a food source. In the past wealthy landowners often had pigeon houses and kept pigeons. Strict laws were enacted to protect the inhabitants of these structures.

== Improving yield ==
Ten pairs of pigeons can produce eight squabs each month without being fed especially by the pigeon keepers. For a greater yield, commercially raised squab may be produced in a two-nest system, where the mother lays two new eggs in a second nest while the squabs are still growing in the first nest, fed by their father. Establishing two breeding lines has also been suggested as a strategy, where one breeding line is selected for prolificacy and the other is selected for "parental performance".

== Hazards ==
Keeping pigeons has been found to lead to a condition called pigeon fancier's lung in some fanciers. Pigeon fancier's lung is an extrinsic allergic reaction resembling asthma which occurs when a person has been exposed to certain proteins in the dust associated with a pigeon's feathers over long periods of time, usually several years. When a fancier develops this condition, there are several treatments which may help them to keep their pigeons. However, some cases are so severe that the fancier must avoid close contact with pigeons.

== Famous fanciers ==
- Al-Muzaffar Hajji (died 1347), Mamluk sultan of Egypt, who was well known for engaging in pigeon raising and racing, to the chagrin of his senior aides.
- Maximilien Robespierre, French revolutionary, raised pigeons and sparrows in his youth.
- Thomas S. Monson has enjoyed raising Birmingham Roller pigeons since he was a young boy.
- Duncan Ferguson, former Everton player, enjoys the sport of pigeon racing.
- Queen Elizabeth II was a fourth generation member of the Royal Family who has enjoyed the sport of pigeon racing. The first racing pigeons at Sandringham were a gift to the future Edward VII by King Leopold II of Belgium in 1886.
- Karel Meulemans, a noted pigeon fancier in Arendonk, Belgium.
- Dušan Ivković, basketball player and coach, FIBA Hall of Famer, EuroLeague Basketball Legend
- Paddy Ambrose (1928–2002), Irish international footballer was said to prefer pigeon racing to the sport that he became famous for.
- Nikola Tesla, famous inventor, fed the pigeons of New York City, nursing those who were sick or injured. Of the birds, he said, "These are my sincere friends."
- Gerry Francis, English footballer, coach and commentator is a pigeon racing fancier.
- Pablo Picasso, famous artist, kept fantails and named his daughter Paloma, which means pigeon in Spanish.
- Charles Darwin, English naturalist, kept fancy pigeon breeds for observation and anatomical study of his test breeding.
- Yul Brynner, actor, The King and I, owned Roller pigeons and was known to take a private helicopter to view aerial performance of his pigeons.
- Mike Tyson, After retiring in 2005, Tyson had a massive pigeon coop constructed in the backyard of his Paradise Valley home for his 350 pigeons; and even appeared in one season of an Animal Planet series in 2011 that documented him competing in the sport of pigeon racing.
- Manuel Noriega, deposed Panamanian dictator, had many palaces to house fancy pigeons.
- Queen Victoria, Queen of the United Kingdom who was fond of the Jacobin strain of fancy pigeons whose feathered "cowl" resembles the garments of Jacobin monks.
- Bill Lawry, former Australian cricketer and Channel Nine cricket commentator. Bill's love of pigeons has been parodied in the successful The Twelfth Man comedy recordings.
- Jonathan Buckley DUP member of the Northern Irish Assembly, representing the Upper Bann constituency. Jonathan comes from a family lineage of pigeon fanciers which dates back four generations.

== See also ==
- List of pigeon breeds
- Pigeon racing
- Dovecote

== Bibliography ==
- Kociejowski, Marius The Pigeon Wars of Damascus [Biblioasis, 2010] contains six chapters on the history of pigeon fancying in the Arab world
- Levi, Wendell (1977). The Pigeon. Sumter, S.C.: Levi Publishing Co, Inc. ISBN 0-85390-013-2.
