= American Pigeon Journal =

Leading 20th-century American magazine devoted to pigeon breeding

The American Pigeon Journal
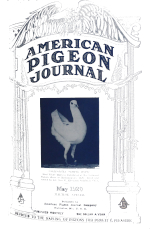
- The May, 1920 cover featuring Hungarian, utility breed
- Editor: Frank L. Hollmann: 1915-79 main publisher
- Former editors: Wm. J. Reid : 1913-14 E. W. Nichols: 1914-15 Hazel W. Hollmann: 1979-83
- Categories: Pigeon, Pigeon Breeds, Squab, Animal Husbandry
- Frequency: monthly
- Circulation: Over 5,000 in 1920
- Publisher: American Pigeon Journal
- Founded: 1913 February
- First issue: 1913 February
- Final issue Number: April 1994; V82 #1 April 1994
- Country: United States
- Language: English

The American Pigeon Journal (APJ) was an American magazine, often believed to be the first pigeon breeding magazine in the US.

It hailed from the west coast – originally Southern California. At that time, it was called the "Pacific Squab Journal" (PSJ), and was first published in 1913. It was not, however, the first magazine devoted to pigeons in America. Even "The Fancier" was not first. It was already in publication in 1886, but even others preceded it."The Fancier", however, had ceased publication before the PSJ began. The "Pigeon News" also started before the APJ, starting in 1895 but ceased publication around 1967 while the APJ continued until 1994, a total of 81 continuous years. While the first issue was devoted mainly to squabbing utility breeds in California, it opened the door to a wider audience, including fancy pigeons along the Pacific coast. In addition to the magazine, they also published books relating to the hobby and business, including "American Squab Culture", and Profitable Pigeon Breeding by Arthur Hazard Although many issues are now over 100 years old, many can be found in Wikicommons (see link on the right) and on the web including on Abe books.

== History ==
=== Pacific Squab Journal ===
The first issue of the PSJ was published in January 1913, and was only four pages long. It was only intended to be published occasionally for the members of the Pacific Utility Pigeon Association. While it was published in Oakland, California, the club that sponsored it was actually centered in southern California.

The next issue, in February, was Volume 1, Issue 2. The publishers decided that the issue provided in January, even though only four pages in length, was to be considered issue number 1. While the first issue was devoted mainly to utility breeds in California, the second issue opened the door to a wider audience, including fancy pigeons along the Pacific coast. That second issue provided information about the recent formation of pigeon clubs and specifically mentions the California Southern Pigeon Association, and included breeders in Portland, Oregon. A few years later by May 1920, fancy pigeons were fully incorporated into the magazine as an integral part. Its scope became national for squabbing interests.

A name change was announced in the June issue of the PSJ to reflect the increasing scope. It was noted that "Beginning with the July number, this magazine will appear as the American Squab Journal."

=== American Squab Journal ===
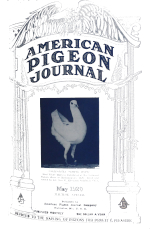
American Pigeon Journal 1920 October cover page

The newly named magazine the, American Squab Journal, started as volume 2 with the July issue of that very first year, 1913. Wm. J. Reid became the publisher. The emphasis of the articles also changed from featuring only utility breeds to including a few fancy pigeons. The ads also changed, including ads for stock, feed, and supplies from all over the country. During 1914, the magazine was acquired by E. W. Nichols, and moved to Kansas City, Missouri. He retained the name of the American Squab Journal. While the focus changed to marginally include more fancy breeds, there were also articles on squabbing breeds including, Hungarians, Runts, Carneaux, Maltese, Mondaines, Homers, and Kings. The magazines masthead was "Devoted to the Advancement of Squab Raising and Marketing".

In 1915 the publisher changed yet again. It was acquired by Frank H. Hollmann for the October issue and moved to Warrenton, Missouri. Hollman had been a subscriber from the magazine's inception. Though he retained the name of the American Squab Journal and the masthead up until May issue of 1920. During 1917 the magazine started offering issues specifically devoted to individual breeds. Then he radically changed the focus to all breeds, renaming it the American Pigeon Journal. For his work in the hobby as the publisher, the National Pigeon Association established a Frank Hollmann award with members of long standing.

=== American Pigeon Journal ===
The magazine had changed hands often. Then Frank H. Hollmann, an original subscriber, became publisher for the October issue of 1915, and continued until his death on January 8, 1979. Hazel W. Hollmann, his wife's name stayed on the informational masthead as ownership until the April 1983 issue. William L. Worley, his son in law, became the owner and publisher for the November, 1984 issue. He had been the editor and manager for many years.

Hollmann retained the name of the American Squab Journal and the masthead up until May 1920. Then he radically changed the focus to all breeds, renaming it the American Pigeon Journal. This was also reflected in the slightly, but significantly, altered new masthead - "Devoted to the Raising of Pigeons for Profit & Pleasure." The issue was devoted to a fancy pigeon breed the Maltese. Over time the magazine moved almost exclusively to fancy breed, squabbing having lost its appeal to the general public. However, the Squab Market report was faithfully published every month until the April issue of 1958. Many issues continued to be specifically devoted to a popular fancy breed, but most covered many varieties. Specialty clubs publish articles presented in the Journal on their web sites. The American National Pigeon Association publication on breeds of the 21st Century dedicated the work to the journal and to Frank Hollmann the main publishere.

=== Special Breed Issues ===
Special issues include:

- "African Owl", August 1976, August 1985
- "Domestic Flights" October 1971,July 1990 , July 1991
- "Fantails" March 1961, December 1968, February 1975, July 1977, September 1985, September 1992
- "Giant Homer", August 1950, June 1970, November 1977
- "Giant Runt", September 1917, February 1980, January 1988
- "Helmet" May 1968
- "Homers" 1917
- "Hungarian" May 1936
- "Jacobine" November 1969, September 1974, April 1980, May 1986,
- "Kings" November 1917, August 1938, June 1959, January 1964, November 1970, July 1980
- "Komorner Tumbler", December 1972
- "Maltese" May 1917 pdf
- "Mondaine" July 1917 pdf, October 1969
- "Modena", June 1957, Apr-May 1962, December 1969, May 1975, September 1984 July 1989
- "National Pigeon Show Special" February 1938
- "Nun" September 1989
- "Oriental Frill May 64 pdf, April 1969
- "Pouters" February 1981, September 1969
- "Rollers", -- 1957 June, April 1976, December 1979, April 1966, May 1985, May 1990
- "Show Racer" 1971 August, 1991 September
- "Swallows", April 1976 March 1985
- "Tipplers", September 1971
- "Toy breeds", August 1972
- "Trumpeters",-- November 1976, November 1985

=== American Pigeon Journals Available as PDF files 1913 - 1920 ===
| year | Jan | feb | Mar | Apr | May | Jun | Jul | Aug | Sep | Oct | Nov | Dec |
|---|---|---|---|---|---|---|---|---|---|---|---|---|
| 1913 | | Feb | Mar | Apr | May | Jun | Jul | Aug | Sep | Oct | Nov | |
| 1914 | | | | | May | | | | | | Nov | Dec |
| 1915 | | Feb | Mar | Apr | May | Jun | Jul | Aug | Sep | Oct | Nov | Dec |
| 1916 | Jan | Feb | Mar | Apr | May | Jun | Jul | Aug | Sep | Oct | Nov | Dec |
| 1917 | Jan | Feb | Mar | Apr | May | Jun | Jul | Aug | Sep | Oct | Nov | Dec |
| 1918 | Jan | Feb | Mar | Apr | May | Jun | Jul | Aug | Sep | Oct | Nov | Dec |
| 1919 | | | | | | | | | | | | |
| 1920 | | | | | | Jun | Jul | Aug | Sep | Oct | Nov | |

=== American Pigeon Journals Available as PDF files 1921 - 1930 ===
| year | Jan | feb | Mar | Apr | May | Jun | Jul | Aug | Sep | Oct | Nov | Dec |
|---|---|---|---|---|---|---|---|---|---|---|---|---|
| 1921 | jan | Feb | Mar | Apr | May | Jun | Jul | Aug | Sep | Oct | Nov | Dec |
| 1922 | Jan | | | | | | | | | | | Dec |
| 1923 | Jan | | Mar | Apr | May | Jun | Jul | Aug | Sep | Oct | Nov | Dec |
| 1924 | Jan | Feb | Mar | Apr | May | Jun | Jul | Aug | Sep | Oct | Nov | Dec |
| 1925 | Jan | Feb | Mar | Apr | May | Jun | Jul | Aug | Sep | Oct | Nov | Dec |
| 1926 | Jan | Feb | Mar | Apr | May | Jun | Jul | Aug | Sep | Oct | Nov | Dec |
| 1927 | Jan | Feb | Mar | Apr | May | Jun | Jul | Aug | Sep | Oct | Nov | Dec |
| 1928 | Jan | Feb | Mar | Apr | May | Jun | Jul | Aug | Sep | Oct | Nov | Dec |
| 1929 | Jan | Feb | Mar | Apr | May | Jun | Jul | Aug | Sep | Oct | Nov | Dec |
| 1930 | Jan | Feb | Mar | Apr | May | Jun | Jul | Aug | Sep | Oct | Nov | Dec |

=== American Pigeon Journals Available as PDF files 1931 - 1940 ===
| year | Jan | feb | Mar | Apr | May | Jun | Jul | Aug | Sep | Oct | Nov | Dec |
|---|---|---|---|---|---|---|---|---|---|---|---|---|
| 1931 | Jan | Feb | Mar | | May | Jun | Jul | Aug | Sep | Oct | Nov | Dec |
| 1932 | | Feb | | Apr | May | Jun | Jul | | | Oct | Nov | Dec |
| 1933 | Jan | Feb | Mar | Apr | May | Jun | Jul | Aug | Sep | Oct | Nov | Dec |
| 1934 | | | Mar | | May | | July | Aug | Sep | Oct | | |
| 1935 | Jan | Feb | Mar | Apr | May | Jun | Jul | Aug | Sep | Oct | Nov | Dec |
| 1936 | Jan | Feb | Mar | Apr | May | Jun | Jul | Aug | Sep | Oct | Nov | Dec |
| 1937 | Jan | Feb | Mar | Apr | May | Jun | Jul | Aug | Sep | Oct | Nov | Dec |
| 1938 | Jan | Feb | Mar | Apr | May | Jun | Jul | Aug | Sep | Oct | Nov | Dec |
| 1939 | Jan | Feb | Mar | Apr | May | Jun | Jul | Aug | Sep | Oct | Nov | Dec |
| 1940 | Jan | Feb | Mar | Apr | May | Jun | Jul | Aug | Sep | Oct | Nov | Dec |

=== American Pigeon Journals Available as PDF files 1941 - 1950 ===
| year | Jan | feb | Mar | Apr | May | Jun | Jul | Aug | Sep | Oct | Nov | Dec |
|---|---|---|---|---|---|---|---|---|---|---|---|---|
| 1941 | Jan | Feb | Mar | Apr | May | Jun | [Jul | Aug | Sep | Oct | | Dec |
| 1942 | Jan | Feb | Mar | Apr | May | Jun | Jul | Aug | Sep | Oct | Nov | Dec |
| 1943 | Jan | Feb | Mar | Apr | May | Jun | Jul | Aug | Sep | Oct | Nov | Dec |
| 1944 | Jan | Feb | Mar | Apr | May | Jun | Jul | Aug | Sep | Oct | Nov | Dec |
| 1945 | Jan | Feb | Mar | Apr | May | Jun | Jul | Aug | Sep | Oct | Nov | Dec |
| 1946 | Jan | Feb | Mar | Apr | May | Jun | Jul | Aug | Sep | Oct | Nov | Dec |
| 1947 | Jan | Feb | Mar | Apr | May | Jun | Jul | Aug | Sep | Oct | Nov | Dec |
| 1948 | Jan | Feb | Mar | Apr | May | Jun | Jul | Aug | Sep | Oct | Nov | Dec |
| 1949 | Jan | Feb | Mar | Apr | May | Jun | Jul | Aug | Sep | Oct | Nov | Dec |
| 1950 | Jan | Feb | Mar | Apr | May | | Jul | | Sep | Oct | Nov | Dec |

=== American Pigeon Journals Available as PDF files 1951 - 1960 ===
| year | Jan | feb | Mar | Apr | May | Jun | Jul | Aug | Sep | Oct | Nov | Dec |
|---|---|---|---|---|---|---|---|---|---|---|---|---|
| 1951 | Jan | | Mar | Apr | May | Jun | Jul | Aug | Sep | Oct | Nov | Dec |
| 1952 | Jan | Feb | Mar | Apr | May | Jun | Jul | | Sep | Oct | Nov | Dec |
| 1953 | Jan | | Mar | Apr | May | Jun | Jul | Aug | Sep | Oct | Nov | Dec |
| 1954 | Jan | Feb | Mar | Apr | May | Jun | Jul | Aug | Sep | Oct | Nov | Dec |
| 1955 | Jan | Feb | | Apr | May | Jun | Jul | | Sep | Oct | Nov | Dec |
| 1956 | Jan | Feb | Mar | Apr | May | Jun | Jul | Aug | Sep | Oct | Nov | Dec |
| 1957 | Jan | Feb | Mar | Apr | May | Jun | Jul | Aug | Sep | Oct | Nov | Dec |
| 1958 | Jan | Feb | Mar | Apr | May | Jun | Jul | Aug | Sep | Oct | Nov | Dec |
| 1959 | Jan | Feb | Mar | Apr | May | Jun | Jul | Aug | Sep | Oct | Nov | Dec |
| 1960 | Jan | Feb | Mar | Apr | May | Jun | | Aug | Sep | Oct | Nov | Dec |

=== American Pigeon Journals Available as PDF files 1961 - 1970 ===
| year | Jan | feb | Mar | Apr | May | Jun | Jul | Aug | Sep | Oct | Nov | Dec |
|---|---|---|---|---|---|---|---|---|---|---|---|---|
| 1961 | | Feb | | Apr | May | Jun | Jul | | Sep | Oct | | Dec |
| 1962 | Jan | Feb | Mar | Apr | May | Jun | Jul | Aug | Sep | Oct | Nov | Dec |
| 1963 | Jan | Feb | Mar | Apr | May | | Jul | Aug | Sep | Oct | Nov | Dec |
| 1964 | Jan | Feb | | Apr | May | Jun | Jul | Aug | | | Nov | Dec |
| 1965 | Jan | Feb | Mar | Apr | May | | Jul | Aug | | Oct | Nov | Dec |
| 1966 | | Feb | Mar | | May | Jun | Jul | Aug | Sep | Oct | Nov | Dec |
| 1967 | Jan | Feb | Mar | Apr | May | Jun | Jul | Aug | Sep | Oct | Nov | Dec |
| 1968 | Jan | Feb | Mar | Apr | May | Jun | Jul | Aug | Sep | Oct | Nov | Dec |
| 1969 | Jan | Feb | Mar | | May | | Jul | Aug | | | | |
| 1970 | Jan | Feb | Mar | | May | Jun | Jul | Aug | Sep | Oct | Nov | Dec |

=== American Pigeon Journals Available as PDF files 1971 - 1980 ===
| year | Jan | feb | Mar | Apr | May | Jun | Jul | Aug | Sep | Oct | Nov | Dec |
|---|---|---|---|---|---|---|---|---|---|---|---|---|
| 1971 | Jan | Feb | Mar | Apr | May | Jun | Jul | Aug | Sep | Oct | Nov | Dec |
| 1972 | Jan | Feb | Mar | Apr | May | Jun | Jul | Aug | Sep | Oct | Nov | Dec |
| 1973 | NA | Feb | Mar | Apr | May | Jun | Jul | Aug | Sep | NA | Nov | Dec |
| 1974 | Jan | Feb | Mar | Apr | NA | Jun | Jul | NA | NA | Oct | Nov | Dec |
| 1975 | Jan | Feb | Mar | Apr | NA | Jun | NA | Aug | NA | Oct | NA | Dec |
| 1976 | Jan | Feb | Mar | Apr | May | Jun | NA | NA | Sep | Oct | Nov | Dec |
| 1977 | Jan | Feb | Mar | Apr | May | Jun | Jul | Aug | Sep | Oct | Nov | Dec |
| 1978 | Jan | Feb | Mar | Apr | May | Jun | Jul | Aug | Sep | Oct | Nov | NA |
| 1979 | Jan | Feb | Mar | Apr | May | Jun | Jul | NA | Sep | Oct | Nov | NA |
| 1980 | Jan | Feb | Mar | NA | May | Jun | Jul | Aug | Sep | Oct | Nov | Dec |

=== American Pigeon Journals Available as PDF files 1981 to end of publication in 94 ===
| year | Jan | feb | Mar | Apr | May | Jun | Jul | Aug | Sep | Oct | Nov | Dec |
|---|---|---|---|---|---|---|---|---|---|---|---|---|
| 1981 | NA | NA | NA | Apr | NA | NA | NA | Aug | NA | NA | NA | NA |
| 1982 | NA | NA | Mar | Apr | NA | Jun | Jul | Aug | Sep | Oct | NA | Dec |
| 1983 | Jan | Feb | NA | Apr | May | NA | Jul | NA | Sep | NA | Nov | NA |
| 1984 | NA | NA | NA | Apr | May | Jun | NA | Aug | NA | NA | NA | Dec |
| 1985 | Jan | Feb | Mar | Apr | May | Jun | Jul | Aug | Sep | Oct | Nov | Dec |
| 1986 | Jan | Feb | Mar | Apr | NA | Jun | Jul | NA | Sep | NA | NA | NA |
| 1987 | Jan | Feb | Mar | Apr | May | Jun | Jul | Aug | Sep | Oct | Nov | Dec |
| 1988 | Jan | Feb | Mar | Apr | May | Jun | Jul | Aug | Sep | Oct | Nov | NA |
| 1989 | Jan | NA | Mar | Apr | May | Jun | NA | Aug | Sep | Oct | Nov | Dec |
| 1990 | NA | NA | NA | NA | NA | NA | NA | NA | NA | NA | NA | NA |
| 1991 | NA | NA | Mar | Apr | May | Jun | NA | Aug | Sep | Oct | NA | NA |
| 1992 | Jan | Feb | Mar | Apr | NA | NA | Jul | NA | Sep | Oct | | |
| 1993 | NA | NA | Mar | Apr | | | | | | | | |
| 1994 | | | | NA | | | | | | | | |
