= American Giant Homer =

Breed of pigeon

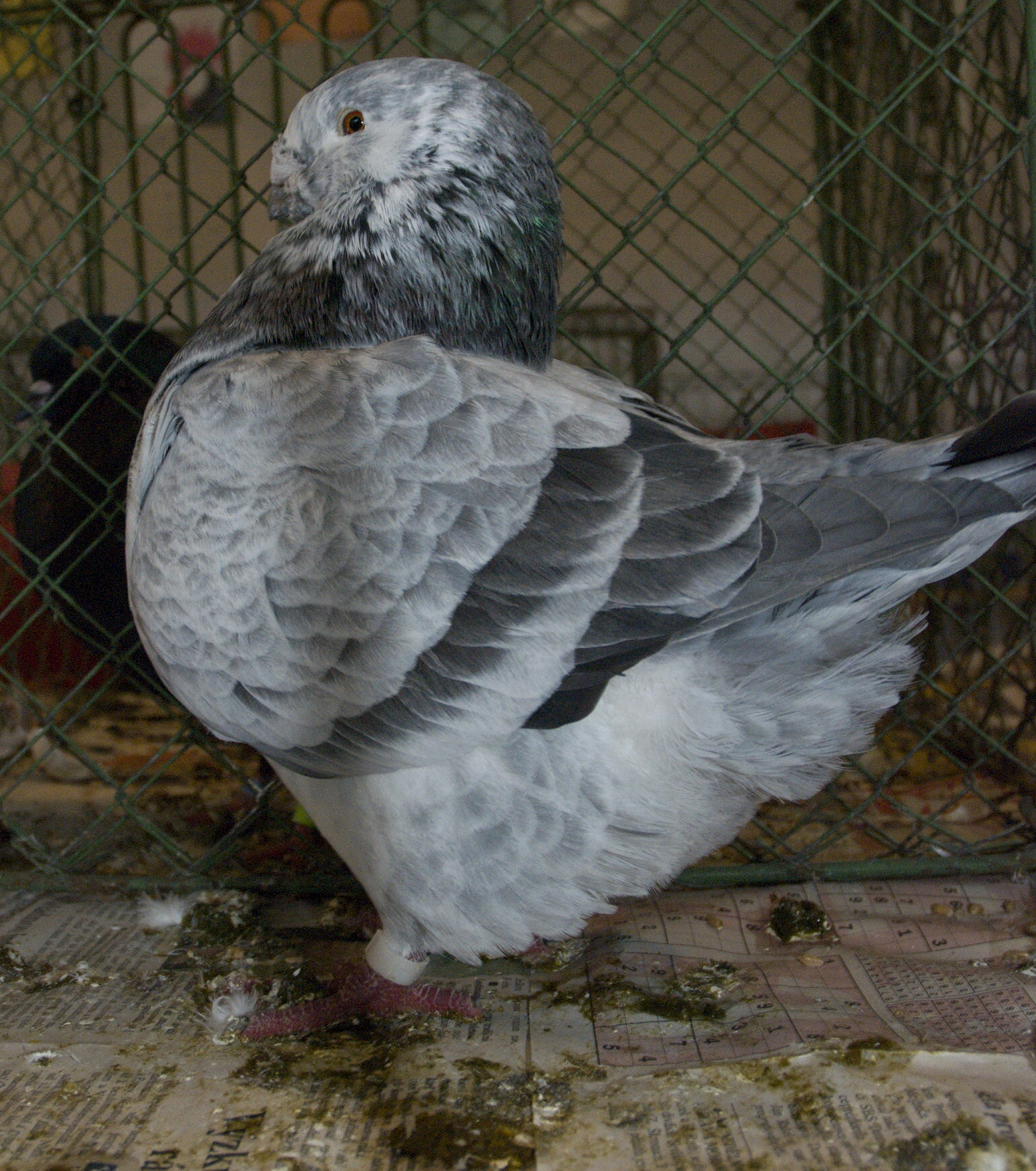
- Grizzle
- Conservation status: Common
- Other names: Giant Homer
- Country of origin: United States

Traits
- Crest type: None
- Feather ornamentation: None

Classification
- Australian Breed Group: Group 4: Homers and Hens
- US Breed Group: Fancy/Utility
- EE Breed Group: Not listed

Notes
- Also known as the Giant Homer, its original name.

The American Giant Homer is a breed of pigeon developed over many years of selective breeding primarily as a fancy breed derived from a utility breed. Giant Homers, along with other varieties of domesticated pigeons, are descended from the rock dove (Columba livia). Breeds used in the development of the Giant Homer include Racing Homer, Coburg Lark, Exhibition Homer, English Show Homer, French Gros Mondain, Antwerp Smerl, and Show Homer.

== Characteristics ==
The breed is known for its large size and suitability for squab production.

The American Giant Homer is large and barrel chested, holding its wings tight to the chest. Their feathers come in nearly every shade and pattern available in the pigeon breeding hobby. Their eyes are a bright red or orange with deep black pupils.

=== Colors ===
The American Giant Homer is found in colors such as blue, silver, black, ash-red, red, yellow, brown, grizzle, mottled, almond, and Andalusian.

== History ==
While the development of most breeds of pigeons are set in antiquity, not so with the American Giant Homer. In fact, many of the people involved in the development of this breed are known by name. The first strains of Giant Homers were begun by two early breeders, R.W. Keene and Wm. P. Gray in the year 1918. This "documented date" was only the continuation of their breeding work, which started some years before 1918. Gray worked to produce a strain of pure white Giant Homers. They were bred from large white Racing Homers. Giant Homers that Keene produced were from Racers and English Show Homers. By 1922, the first year that the Giant Homer was classified as one of the top utility breeds, its specific National Show Class was called the Jumbo Squab Homer, and was divided into seven color classes: White Jumbo Homers, Black Jumbo Homers, Blue or Silver Jumbo Homers, Red or Yellow Jumbo Homers, Black or Blue Cheques, Red or Yellow Cheques, and AOC Jumbo Homers.

Early on, great emphasis was put on production of squabs, both by numbers produced per pair and total yearly weight. In 1933, Giant Homers won the New Jersey State Squab Breeding Contest with 30 pens competing with 10 other breeds. This was won with the highest production ever attained in any squab raising contest. Results for each month's efforts were published in Frank Hollmann's American Pigeon Journal.

Later, Carl Graefe, Irvin Goss, and Ed Blaine transformed the breed from being an oversized flying homer to a very large, blocky, short-feathered bird. Additional color types were bred into the breed by Gerhard Hasz and George Steams, including "Dual-colored" (auto-sexing), a variety also found in the Texan Pioneer. Hasz and Steams promoted colors and used technical terms such as homozygous and sex-linked until the usage of genetic terms became commonplace, resulting in the further development of the breed to what we see today.

== Status ==
Common: The (National Pigeon Association) NPA recognized the Giant Homer in 1928. They have been exhibited at most NPA shows since, as well as at other major shows throughout the United States. They are now also seen in Europe and all over the world.

== Diet ==
Pigeons are fed either a raw whole grain or a pellet mix designed specifically for pigeons. Inorganic materials are also needed in their diets, including salts, minerals, and calcium. Mixes made specifically for pigeons are readily available, called pigeon grit.

== Gallery ==
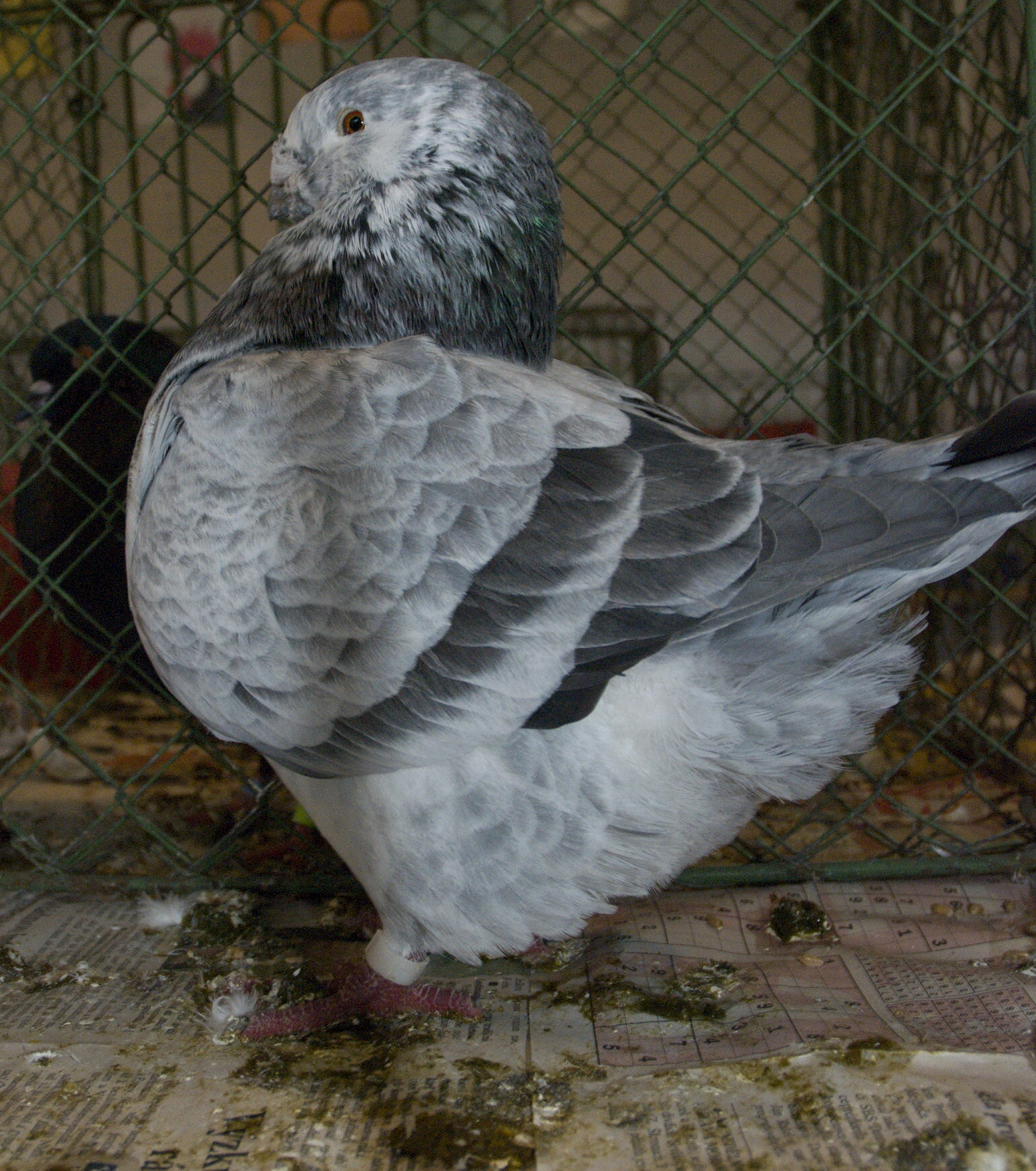
Grizzle

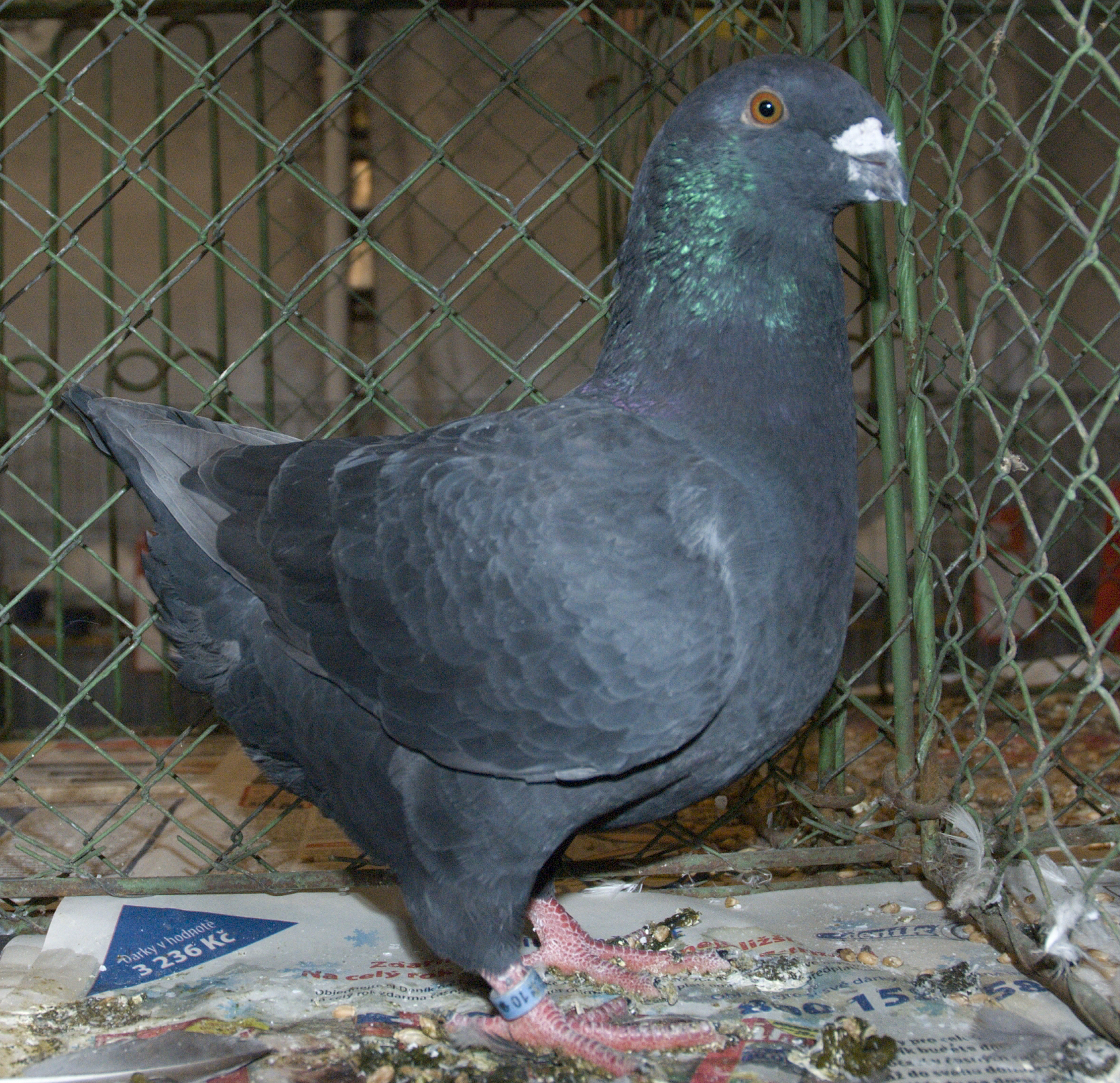
Black

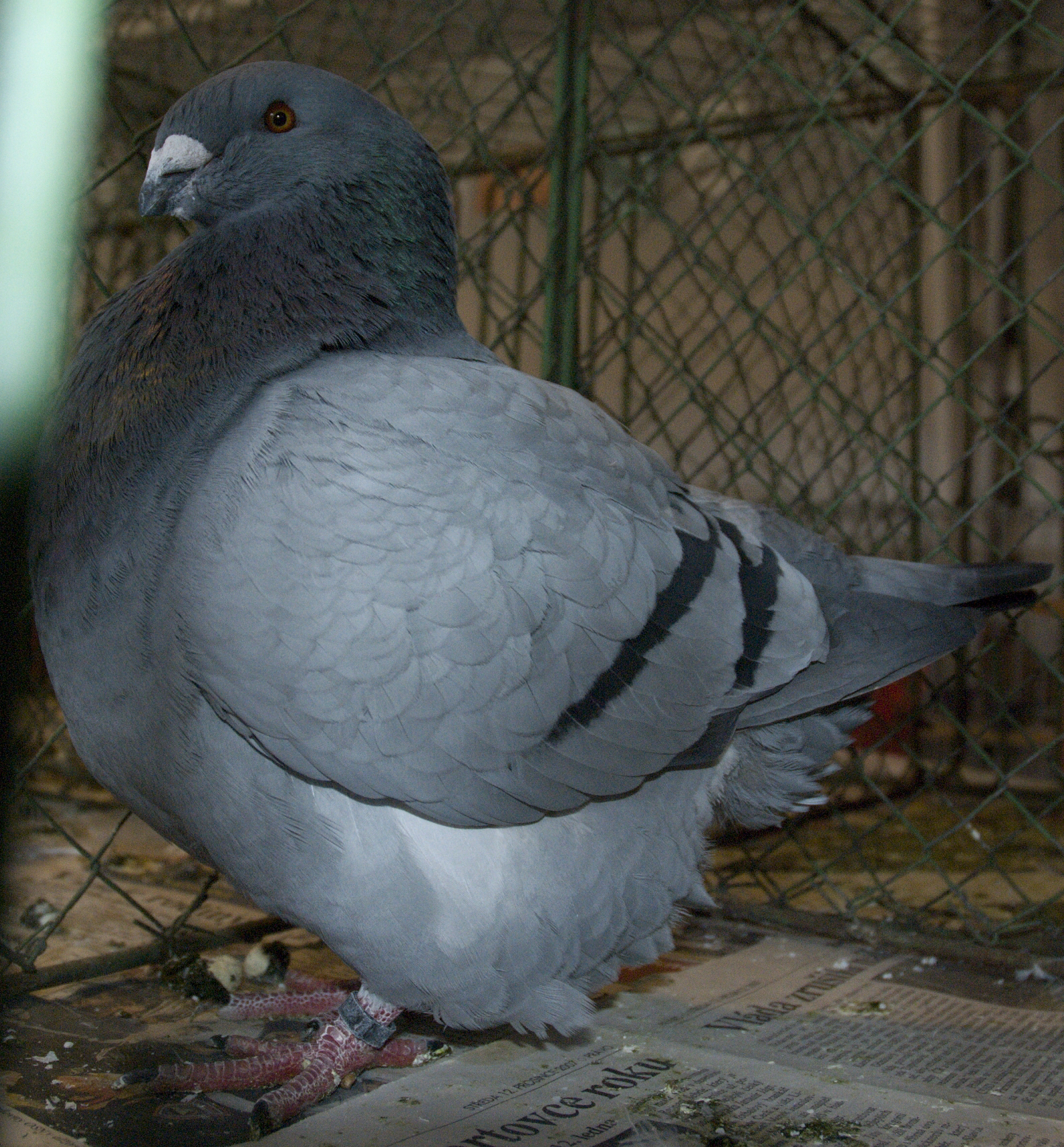
Blue bar

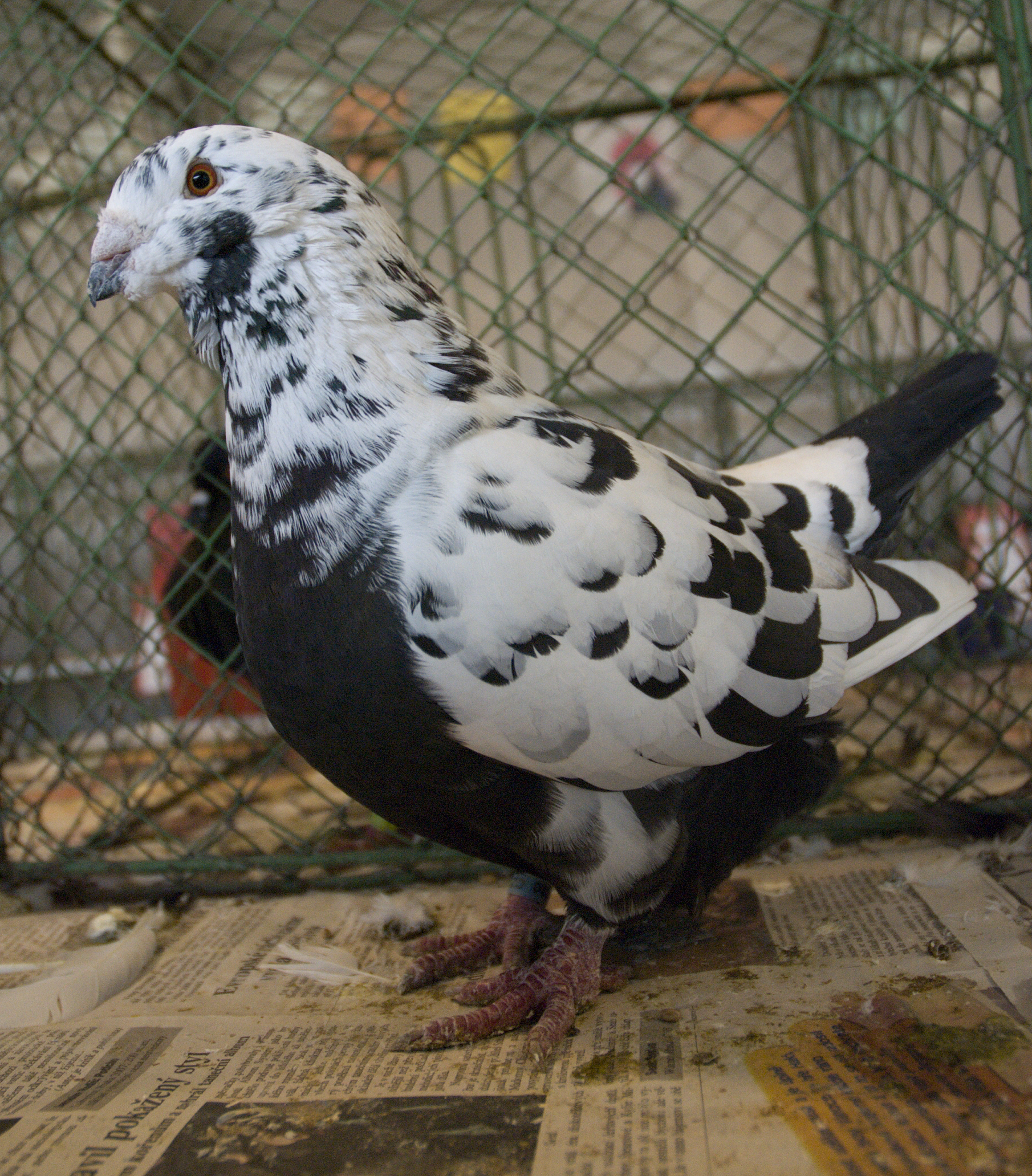
Spotted

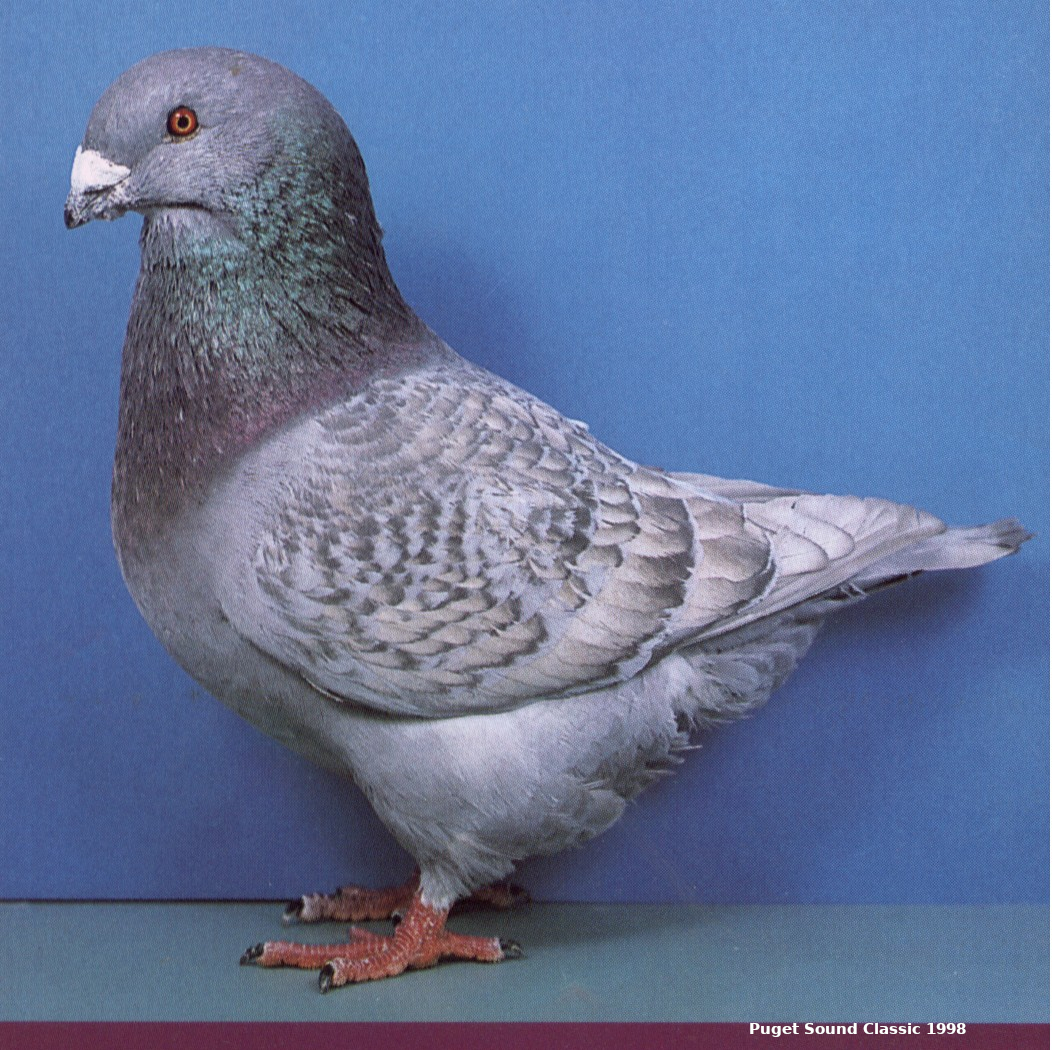
Andalusian

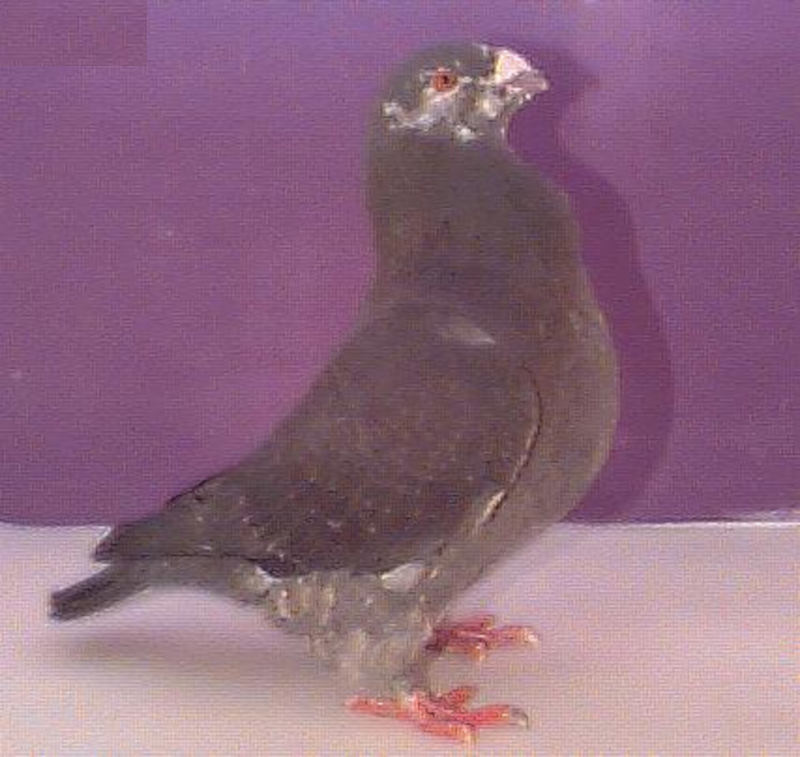
Dark Check

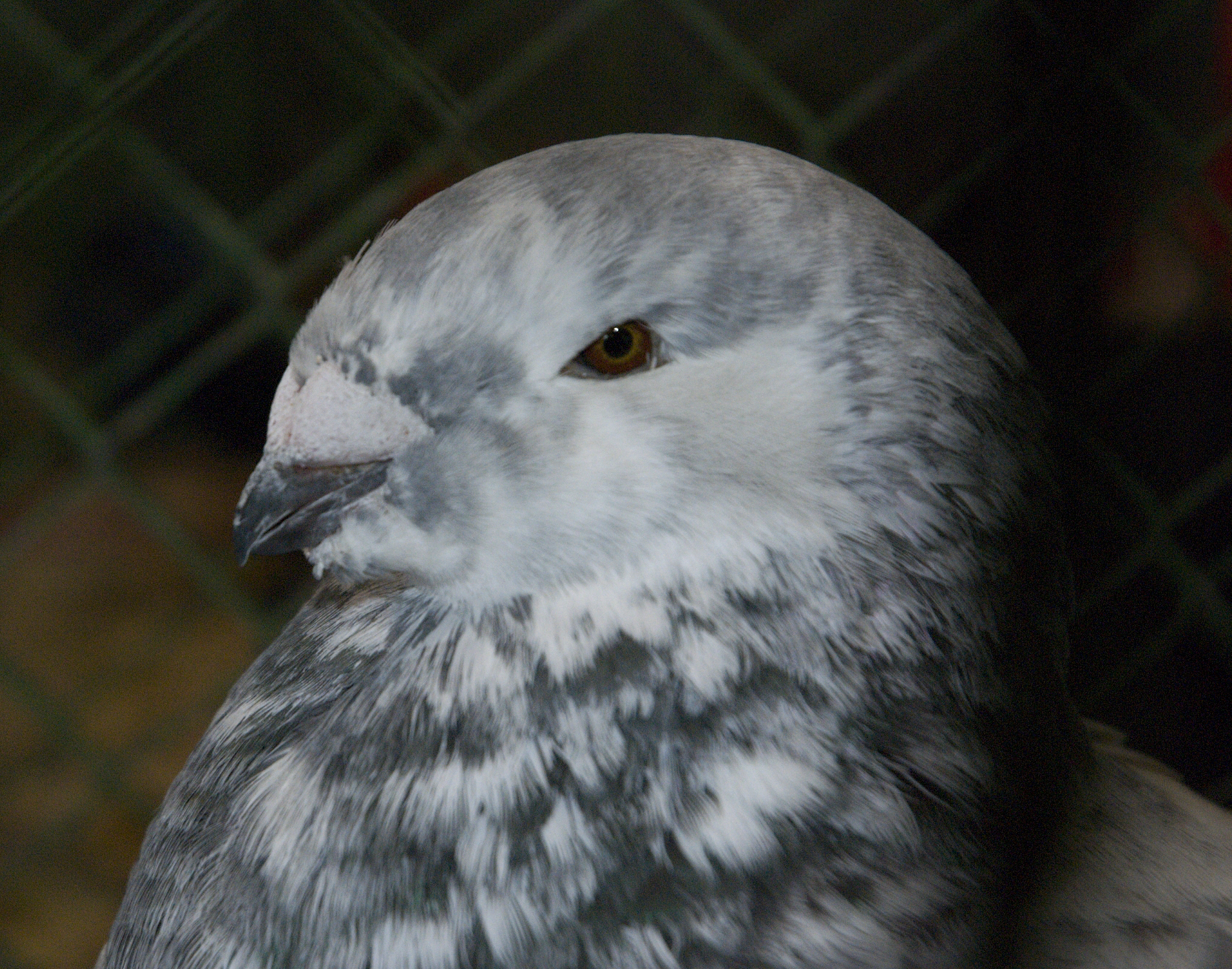
Grizzled head

== See also ==
- Pigeon Diet
- Pigeon Housing
- List of pigeon breeds
- Media related to Giant Homer at Wikimedia Commons
