= Jacobin pigeon =

Breed of pigeon

Jacobin
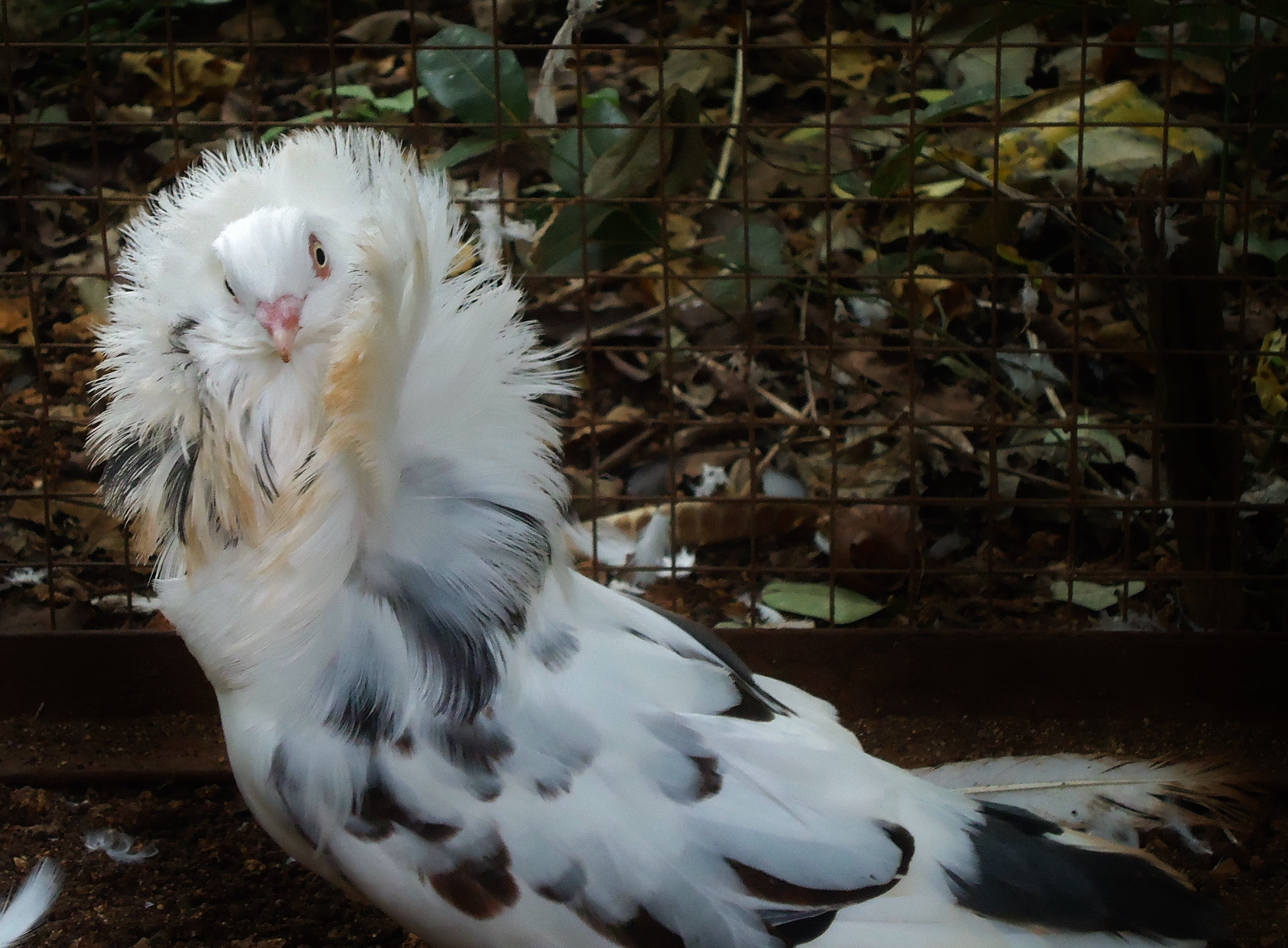
- A Jacobin pigeon
- Conservation status: Common
- Country of origin: India

Traits
- Feather ornamentation: The head ornament is a combination of three parts known as the hood, mane and chain.

Classification
- Australian Breed Group: Asian feather and voice pigeons
- US Breed Group: Fancy pigeons
- EE Breed Group: Structure pigeons

Notes
- A popular exhibition breed.

The Jacobin is a breed of fancy pigeon developed over many years of selective breeding that originated in Asia. Jacobins, along with other varieties of domesticated pigeons, are all descendants of the rock pigeon (Columba livia). It is in the Asian feather and voice pigeon show group. The breed is known for its feathered hood over its head.

The breed name comes from the feather arrangements on their heads (known as a muff or cowl) that look similar to the hoods that Jacobin monks wore.

It is an unusual and popular pigeon. It can be found on the cover of Extraordinary Pigeons and the American Pigeon Journal devoted three entire issues to the breed.

== Origin and habitat ==
Jacobin Pigeons originated in India, but have evolved after many years of selective breeding. The breed started in India in the 1500s but has since evolved into the Jacob we know today. Explorers brought the breed to Europe in the 16th century. A distinguishing factor commonly associated with this breed of bird is the feathered hood covering its head, this is a genetic mutation. This breed, along with a few others has evolved from the Wild Rock Pigeon or the "feral pigeon". The Jacobin Pigeon gained its name through the Jacobin order of Monks, present in the year 1100 who were also known for their distinct hoods and practices. This breed's lifespan is around 15 years and is not for beginner bird keepers.

== Appearance ==
The Jacobin Pigeon is a medium-sized pigeon not as robust as a racing pigeon. Hidden behind the feathers is a slender lanky body. Colors can vary in this species, ranging from white, black, blue, red, yellow, and silver. Over its head, there is a distinct muff or cowl of fluffed feathers that form in the shape of a rosette surrounding the pigeon's head. The hood stands around 5 inches around the skull of the animal. The bird grows to around 14 inches and weighs about 350 grams. While the body and head are covered in feathers, the legs are bare. It is extremely hard to tell the difference between male and female Jacobin Pigeons just based on their color and appearance. As they are almost identical in markings and colors, only a trained eye can easily determine the gender of adult pigeons solely based on appearance. The male pigeon tends to have a thicker head and wider neck, looking more robust than a female of the same species. A juvenile Jacobin Pigeon will have paler feathering than the adults and will not have developed a robust neckband of feathers.

=== Gallery ===
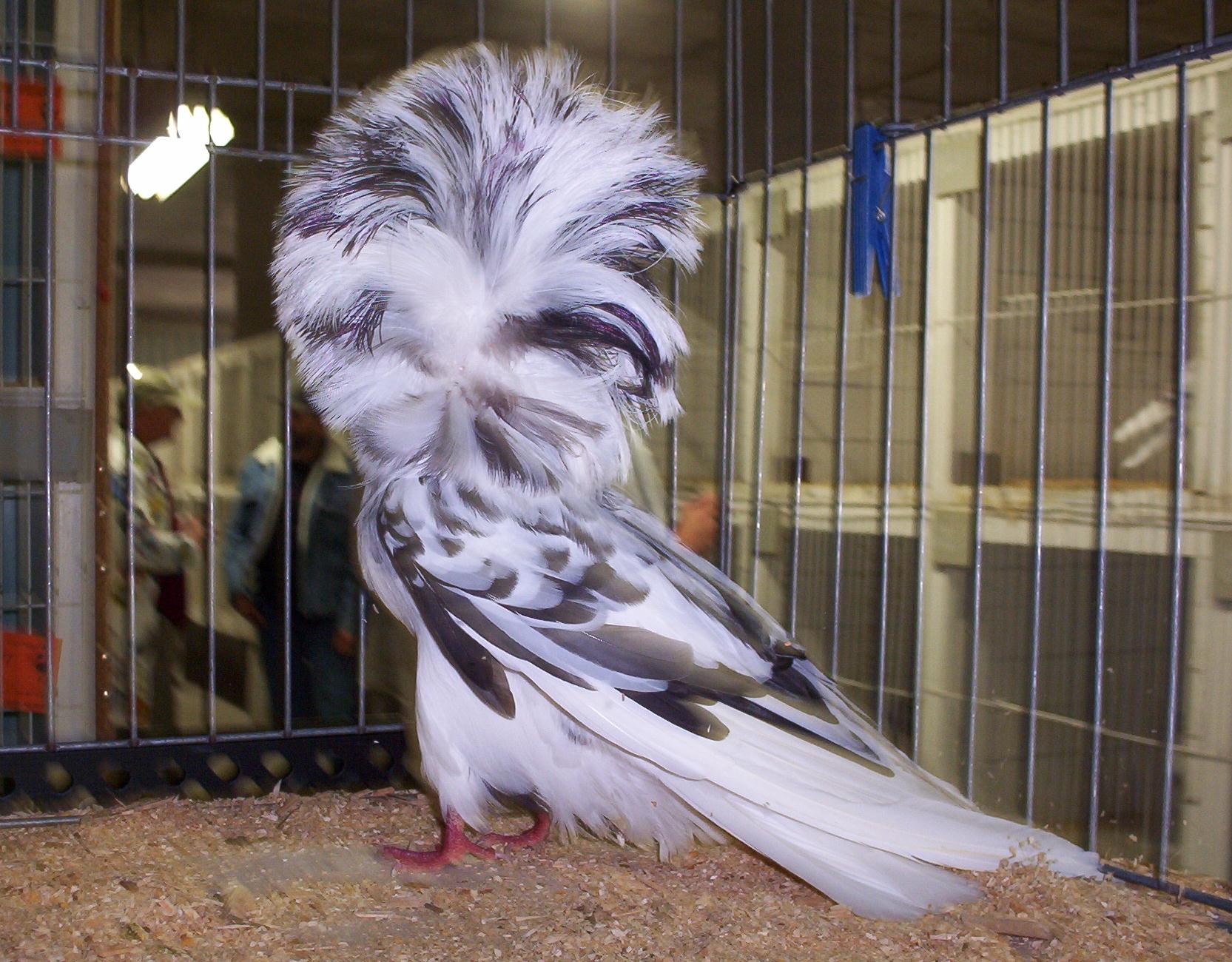
Black Splash

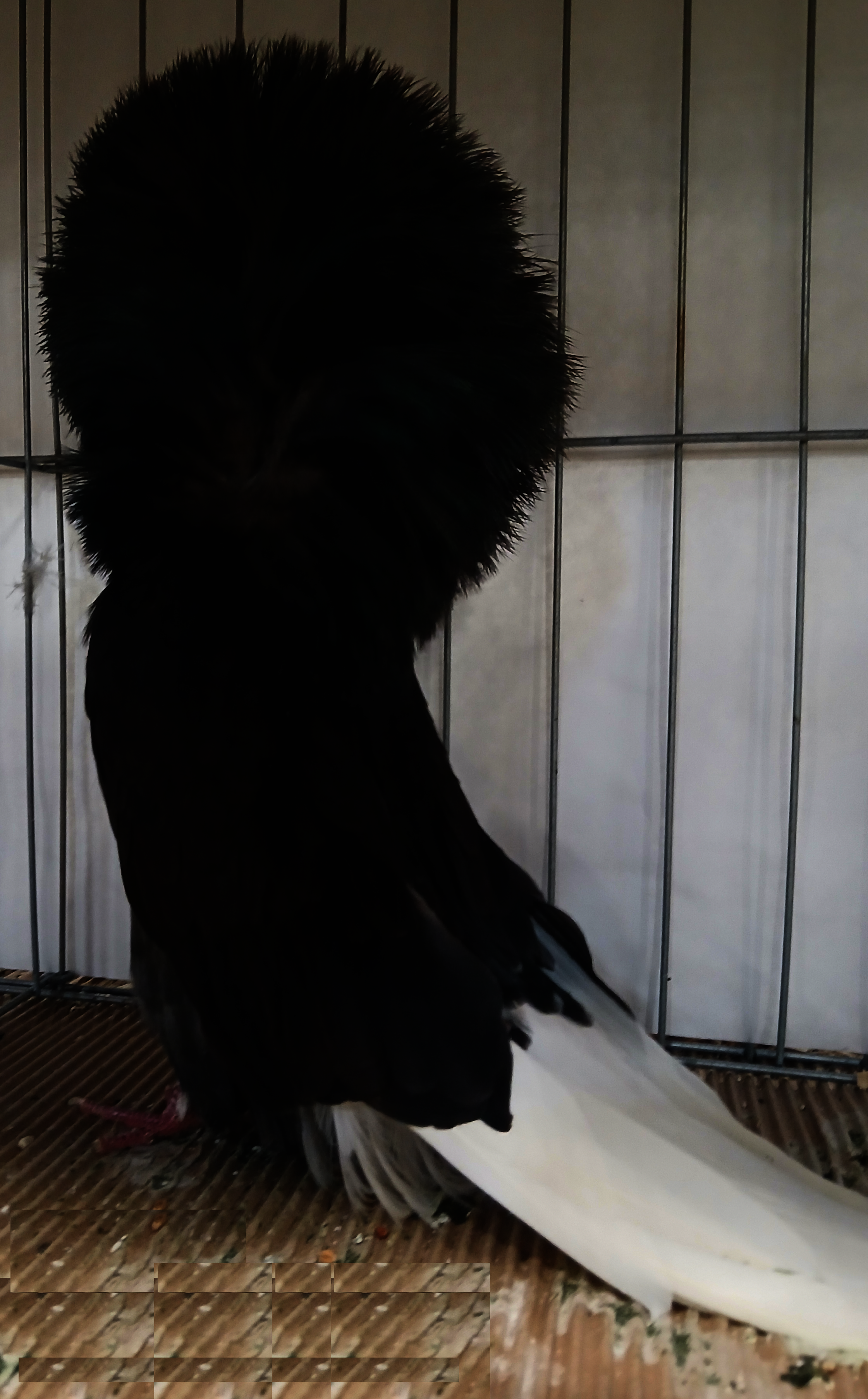
Black

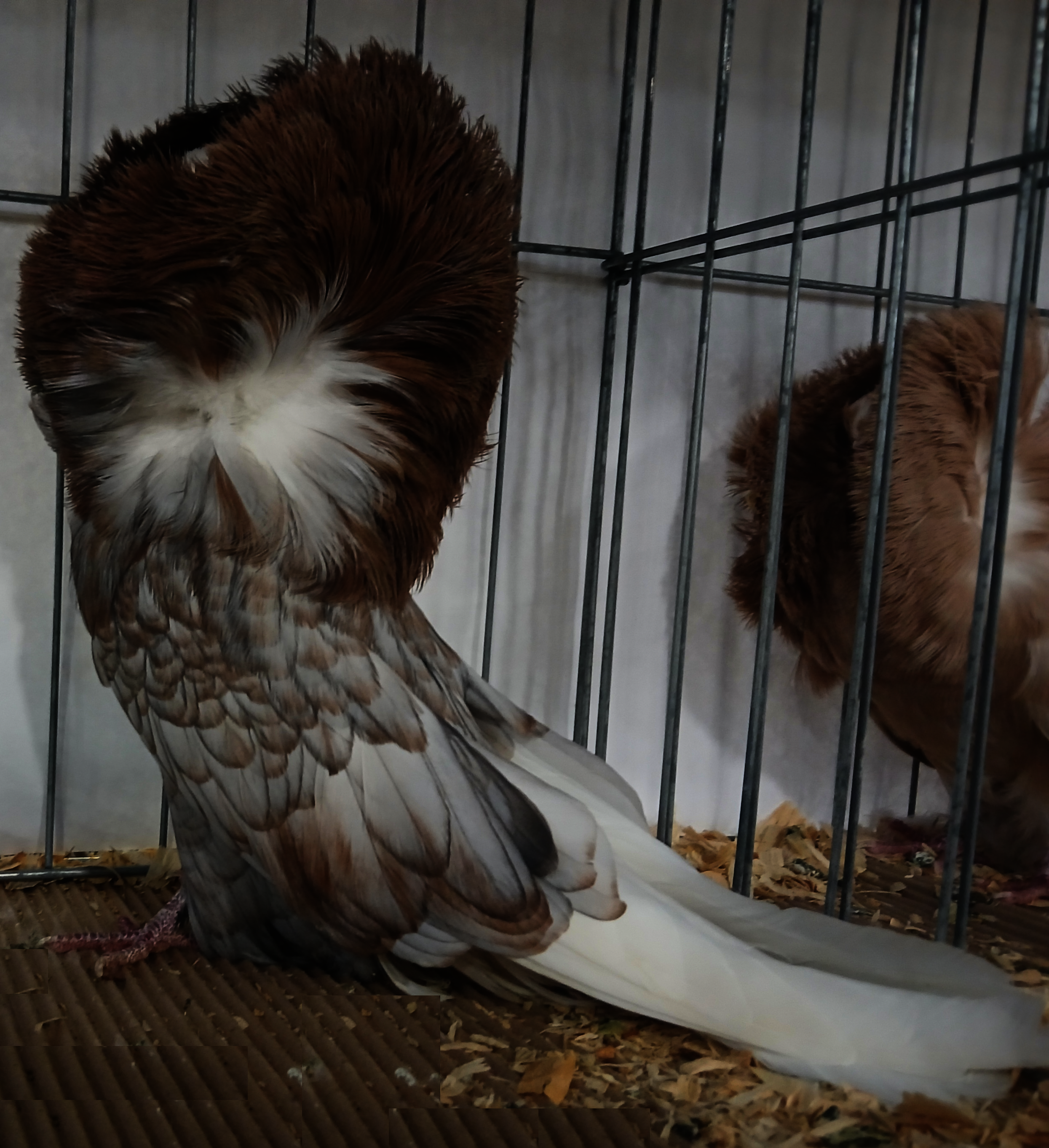
Red splash

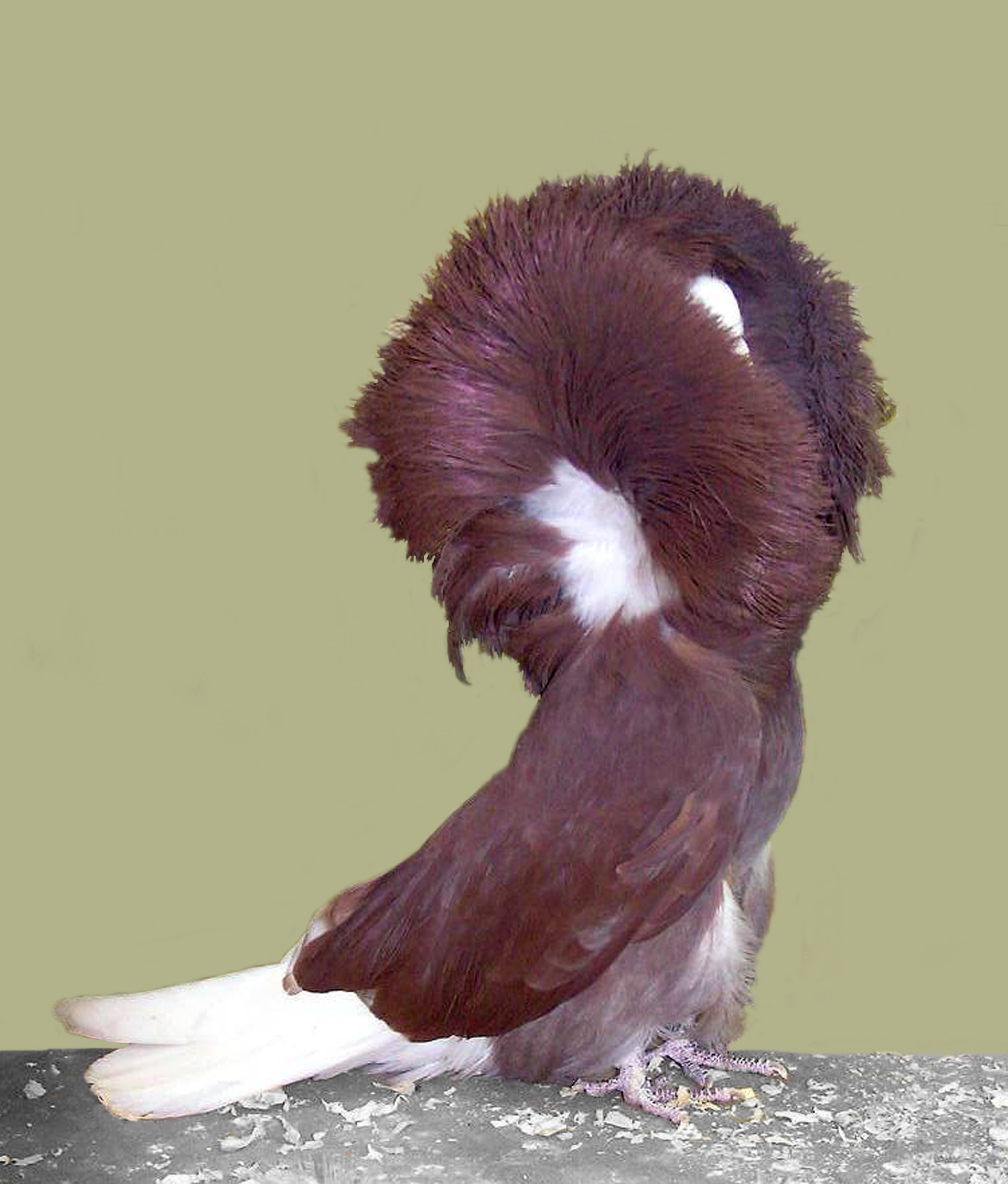
Red

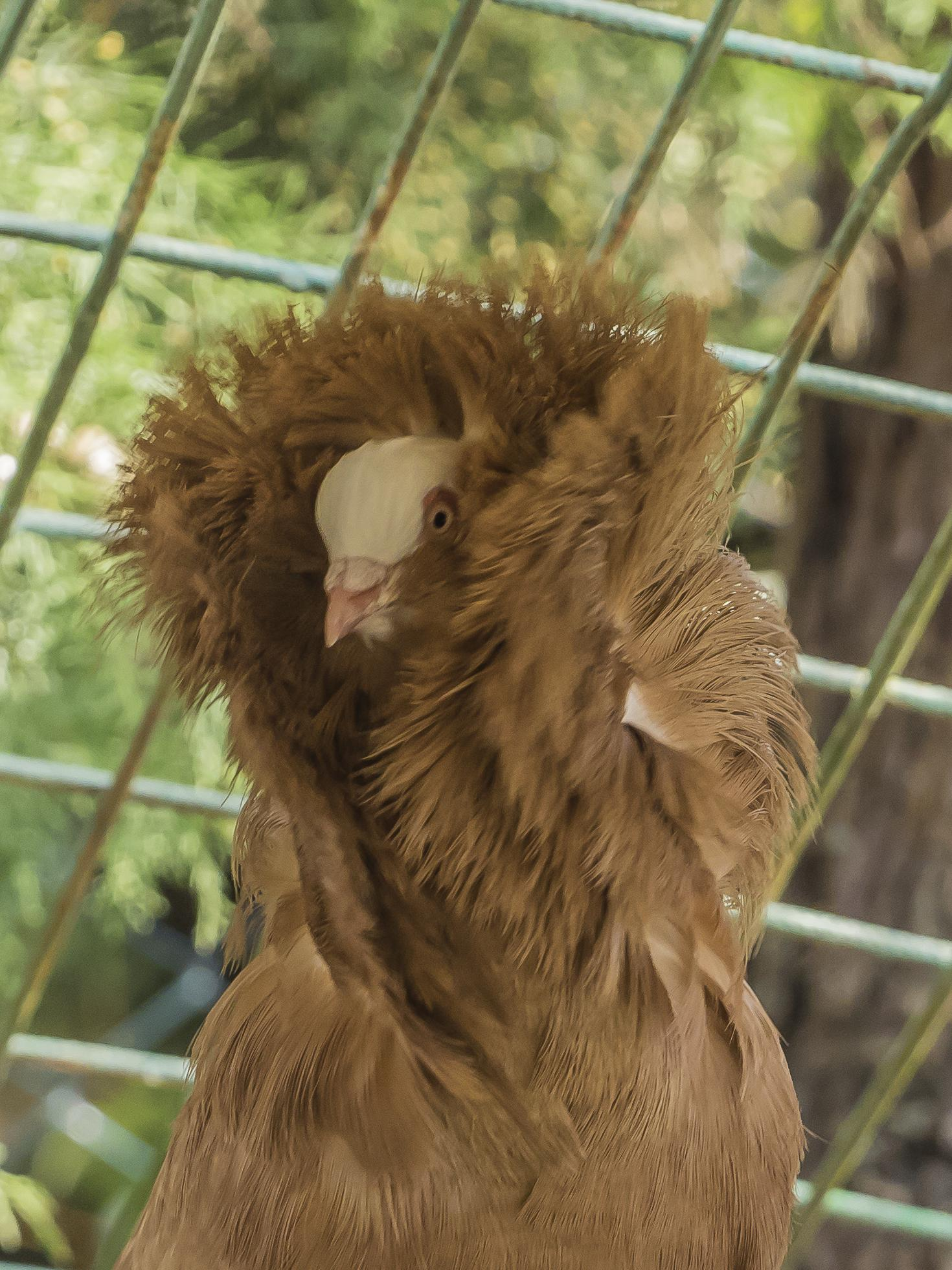
Head View

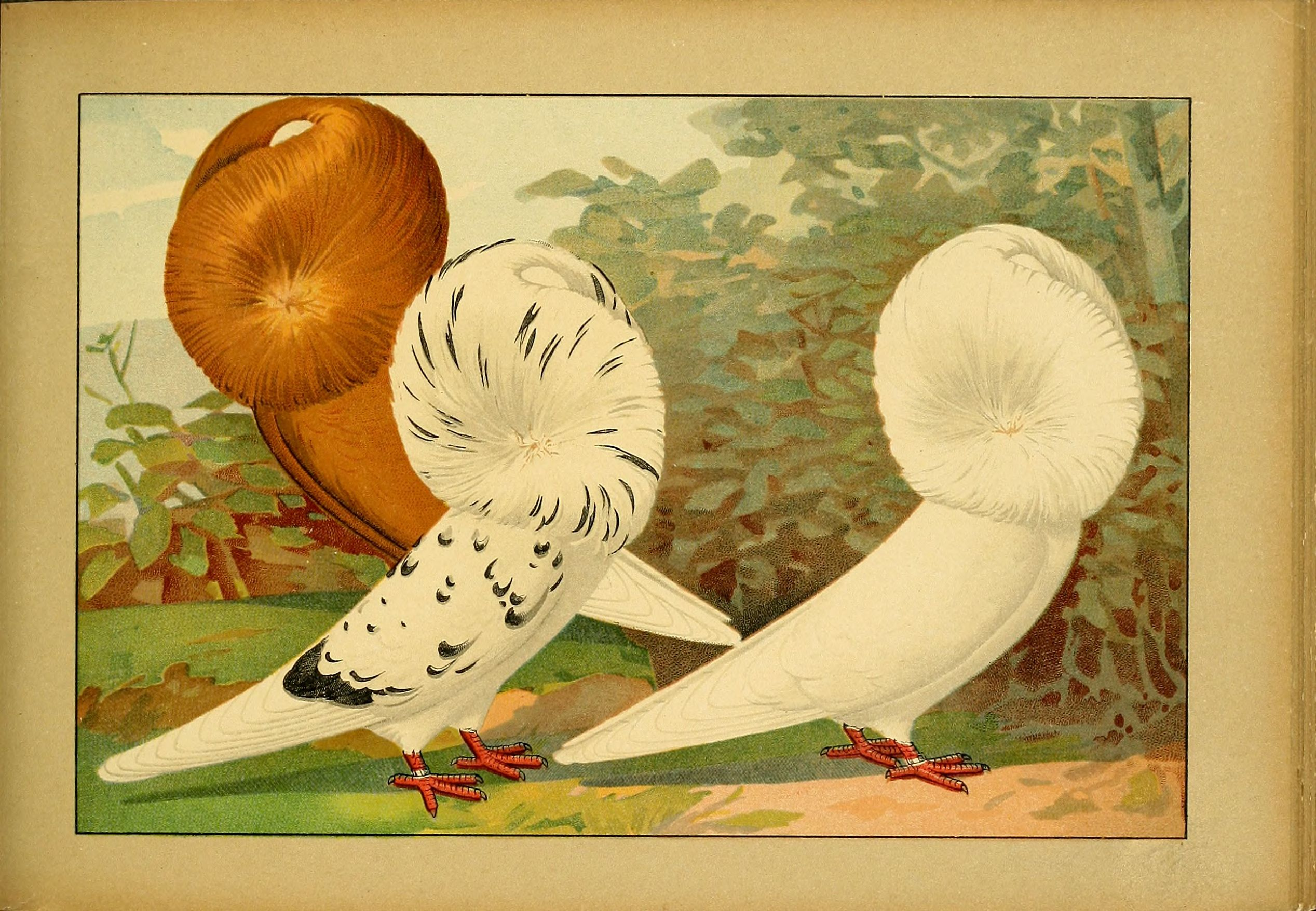
Schachtzabel 1906 Tafel 55

== Mating ==
Jacobin Pigeons have a unique way of reproduction. When bred in captivity, the hood is trimmed to prevent it from interfering with mating. Generally, Jacobins should have found a mate by late July. When hens are ready to lay eggs, they lay one egg and then wait one day before laying the next. Often foster parents are used for this breed, Jacobin breeding has led to a short beak which makes feeding chicks much harder. Homer Pigeons are often used as the foster parents for the Jacobins. Once the Jacobins have found a mate, it is crucial to keep them away from other birds. Male Jacobins choose their mate by circling a female on the ground and inflating his neck feathers. The males are often very aggressive to other males who could cause a threat. The birds will fight until one or the other "wins" and take over the space as well as the female.

== Diet ==
They get the majority of their hydration from standing water. Pigeons can actually drink from standing water just by dipping their beak into the water, they do not have to tip their head back to swallow like other birds. When kept in captivity, it is easier to regulate what the pigeons are eating. They can be fed regular store-bought pigeon food. Adding wheat and legumes is popular when providing the birds with their diet, mixing this with pigeon feed is important. While pigeon feed is not a great feed to give alone, it provides necessary vitamins and minerals to the pigeon.

== See also ==
- List of pigeon breeds
- American Pigeon Journal 1964 October
- American Pigeon Journal 1974 December.
- American Pigeon Journal 1980 April.
- De Structuurduiven
