= French Mondain =

Breed of pigeon

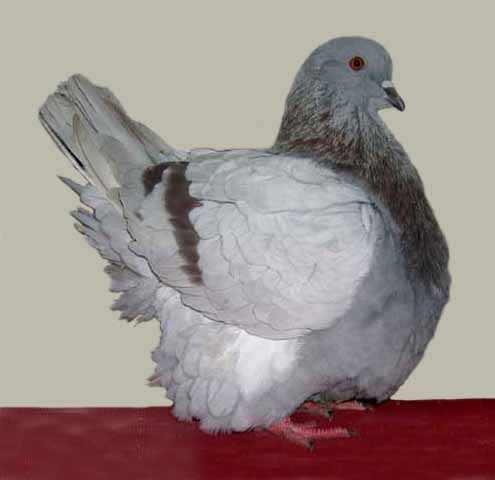
- Mealy French Mondain
- Conservation status: Common
- Other names: Mondain
- Country of origin: France

Classification
- Australian Breed Group: Homers and Hens Group 4
- US Breed Group: Form
- EE Breed Group: Utility

Notes
- The breed name "Mondain" derives from Monde, which means "earthy". This is a reference to the earth-bound nature of this breed.

The French Mondain is a breed of fancy pigeon developed over many years of selective breeding. French Mondains, along with other varieties of domesticated pigeons, are all descendants from the rock pigeon (Columba livia). The breed was originally developed in France as a utility pigeon. It was popular in America as a squabbing pigeon around the early part of the 20th century, The American Pigeon Journal published special issues to it on July of 1917, and again in September 1969.

== American and European styles ==
The French Mondain is available in two different styles. The American and European French Mondain are actually different breeds that share the same name.

Mr Pieter AH Du Toit of Southern-Africa is currently the owner of the World Champion French Mondain Pigeon called Mufasa, who won the International Pigeon Award in Brussels, Belgium, in 2010; he is commonly known as the top breeder and expert of this breed across the globe.

== Gallery ==
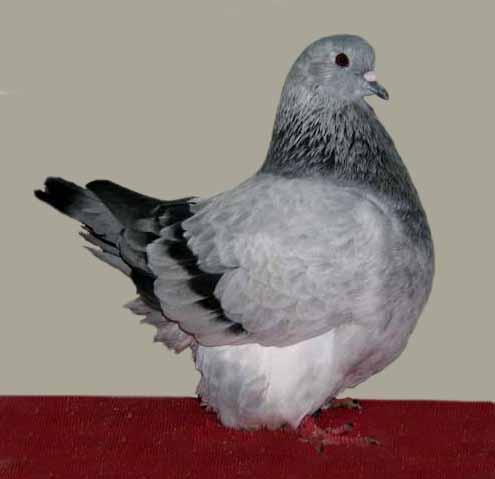
Blue Grizzle

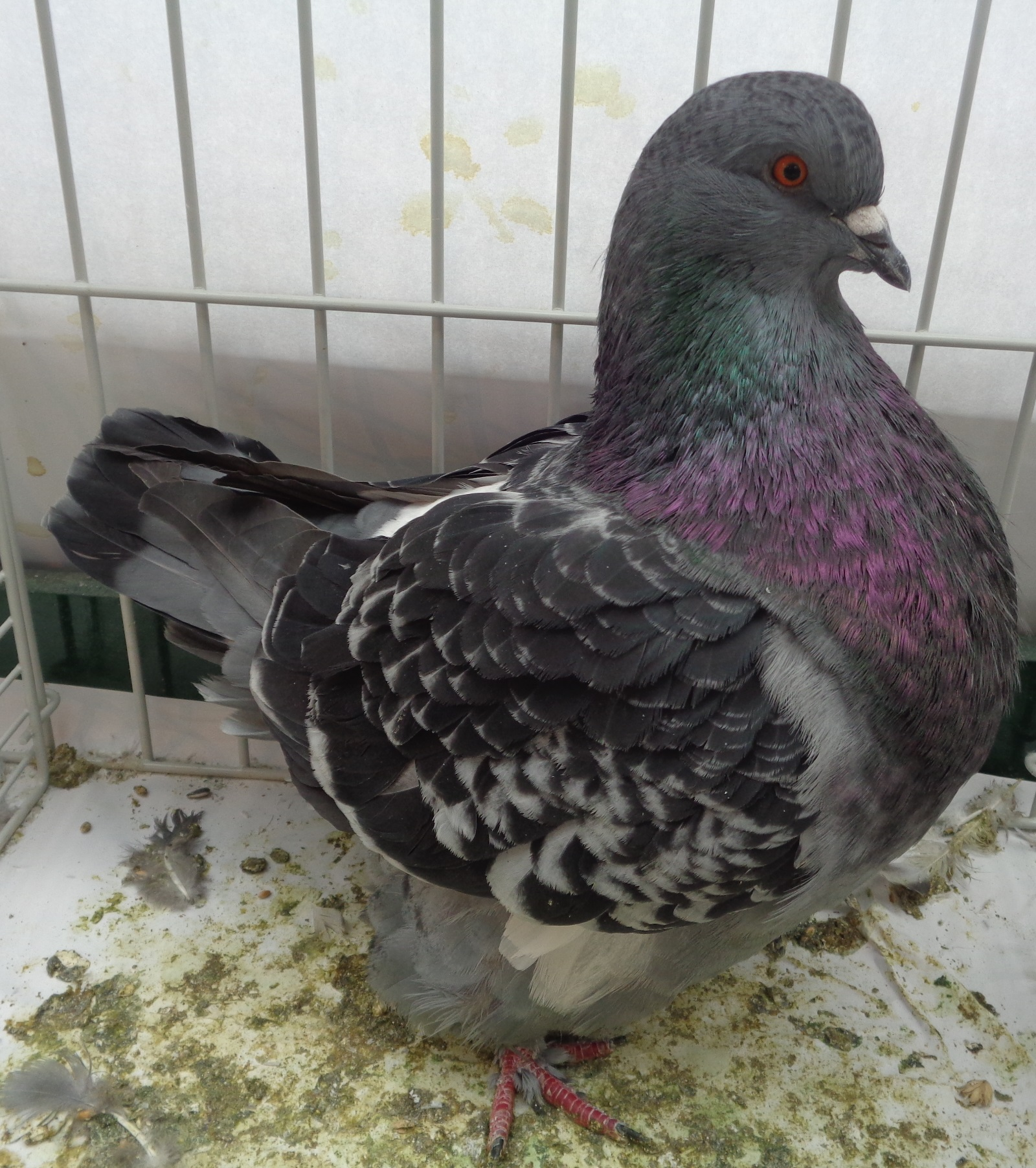
Blue check

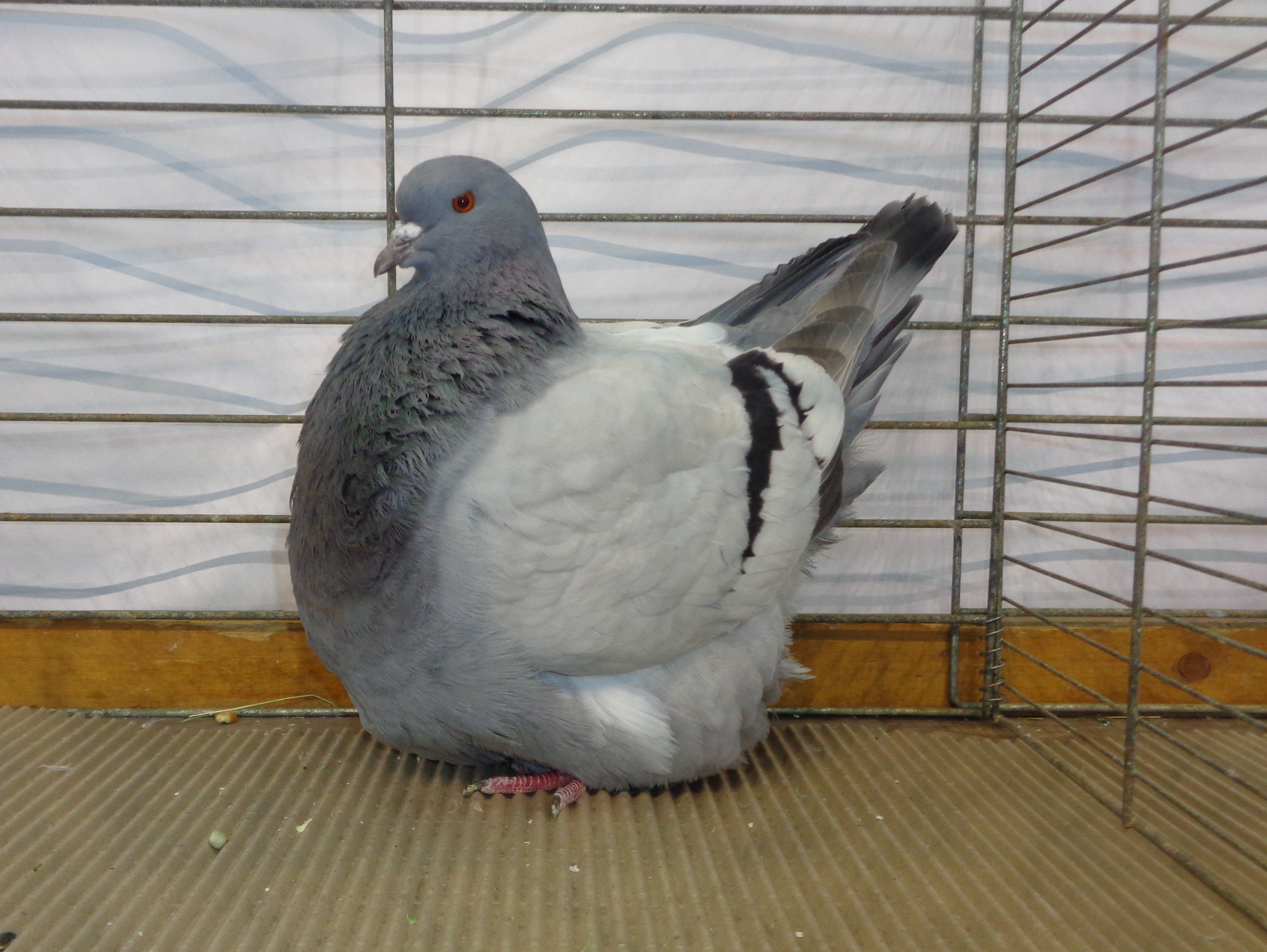
Blue bar

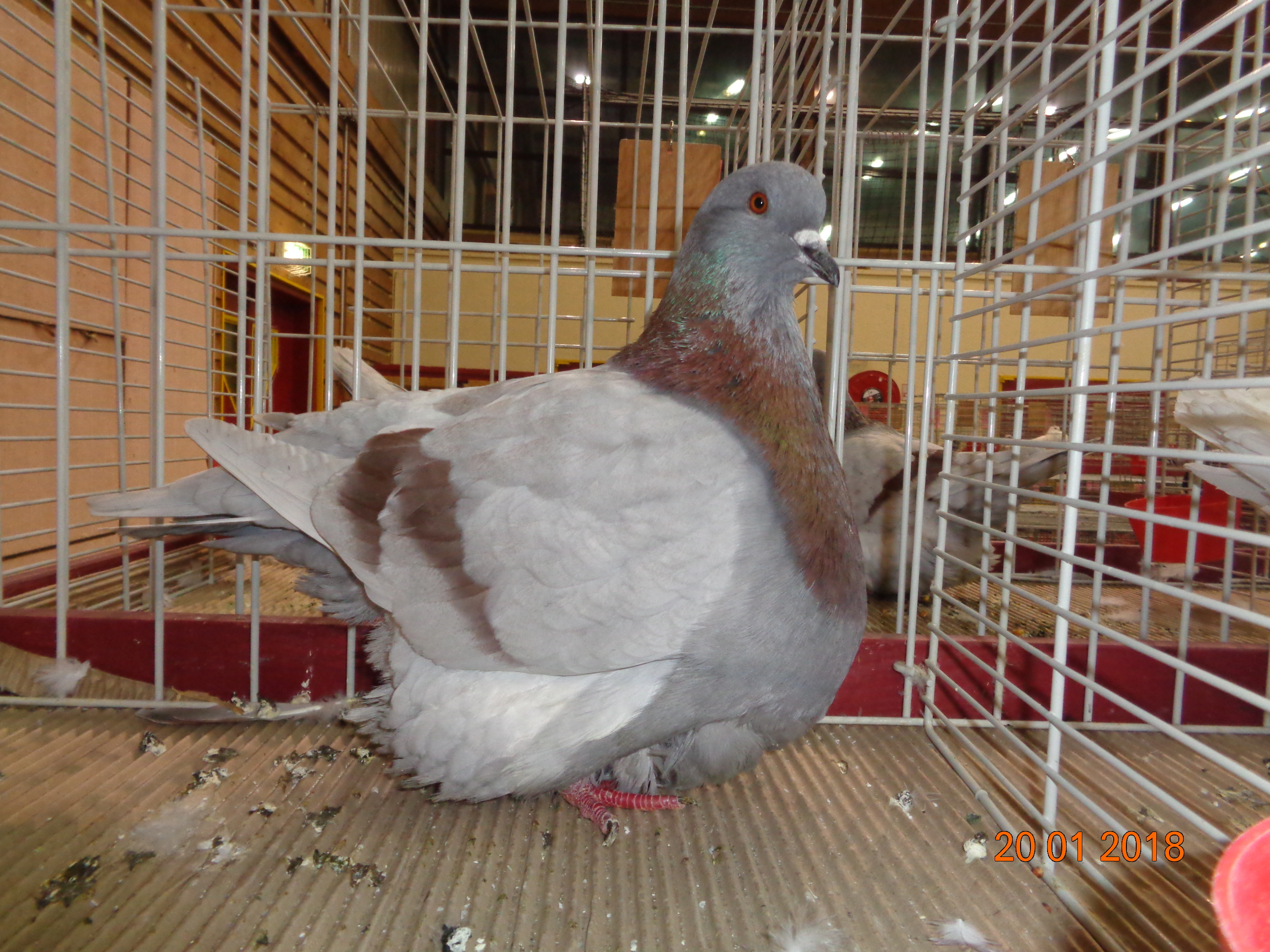
Red bar

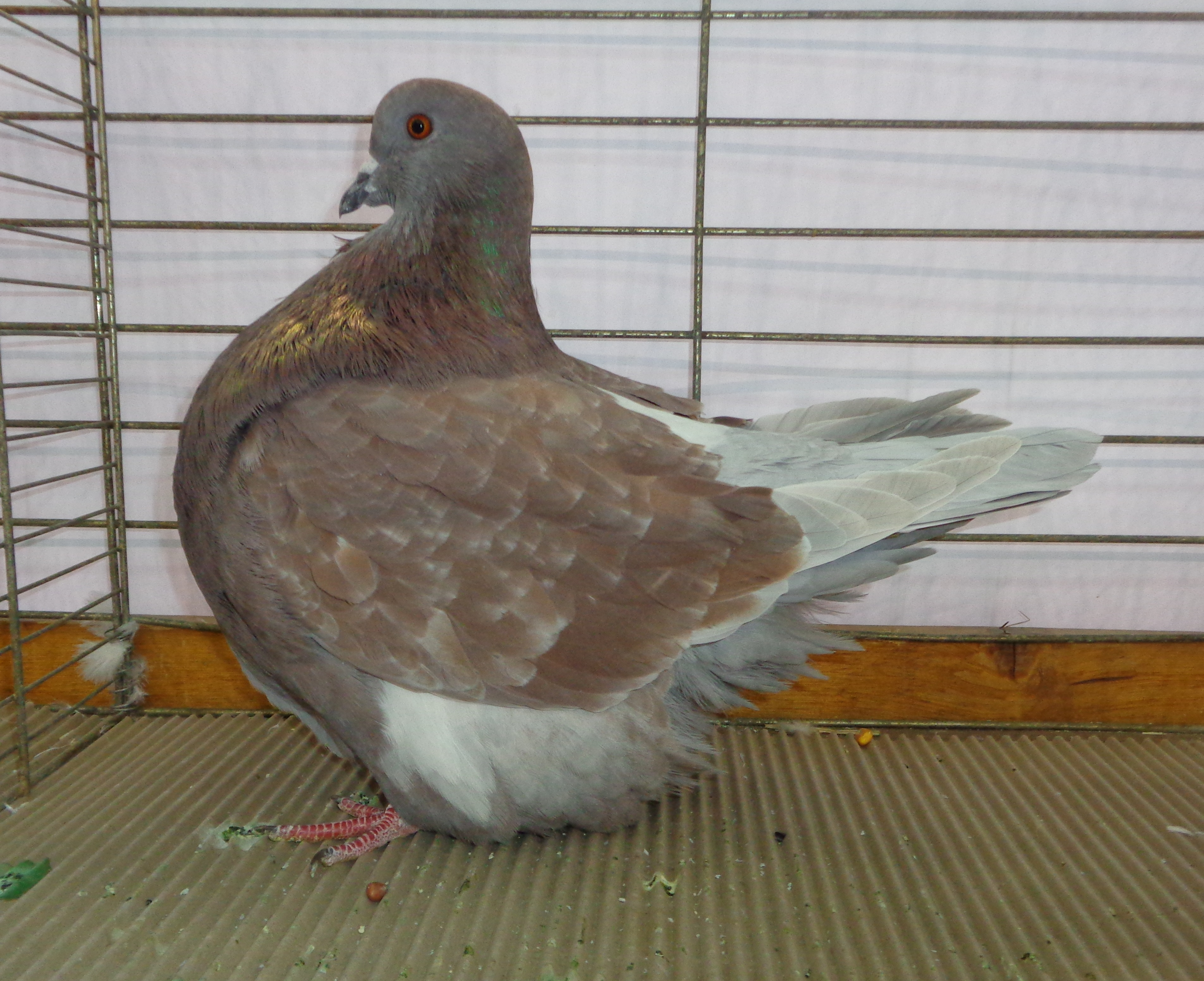
Red check

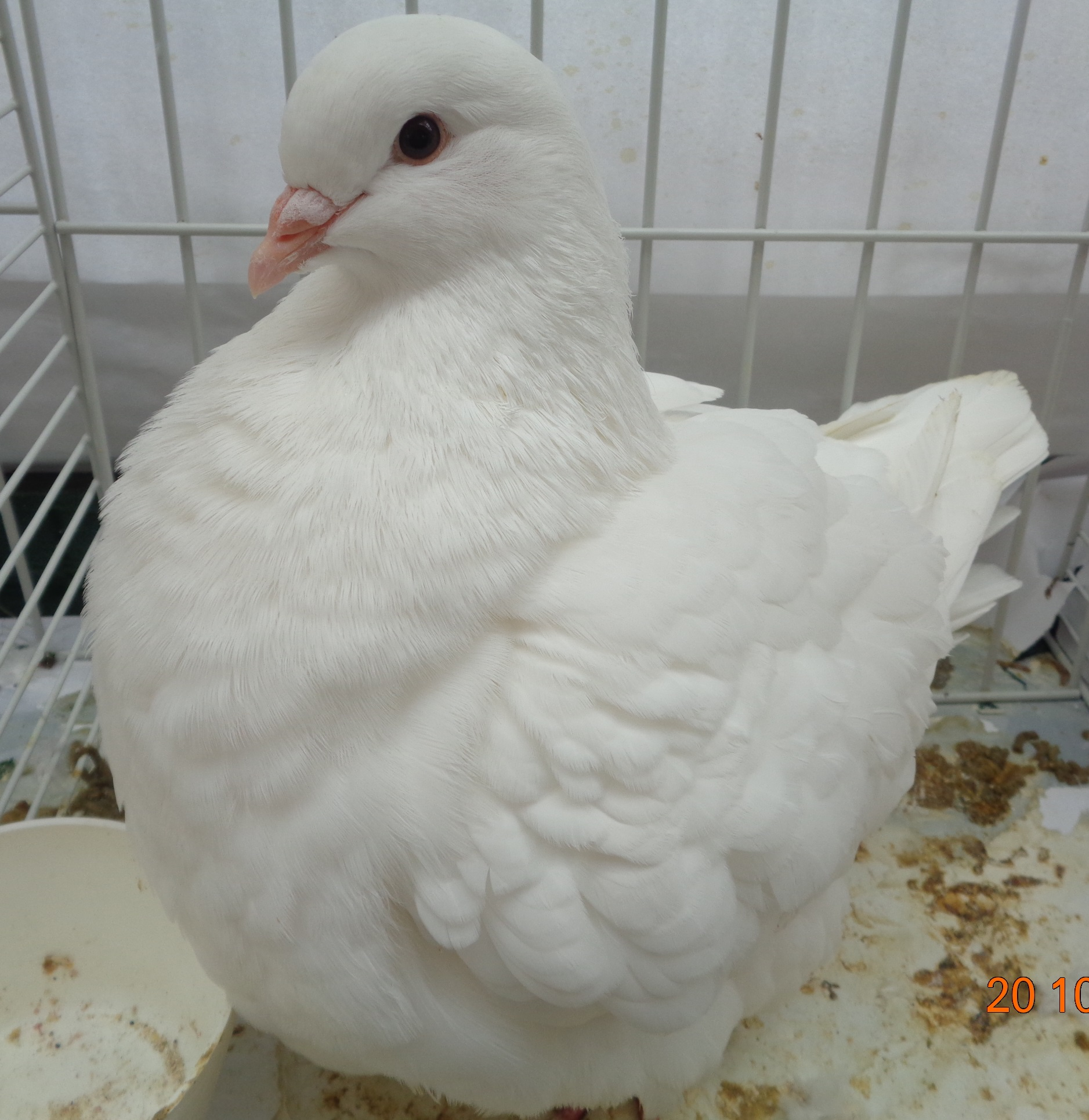
White

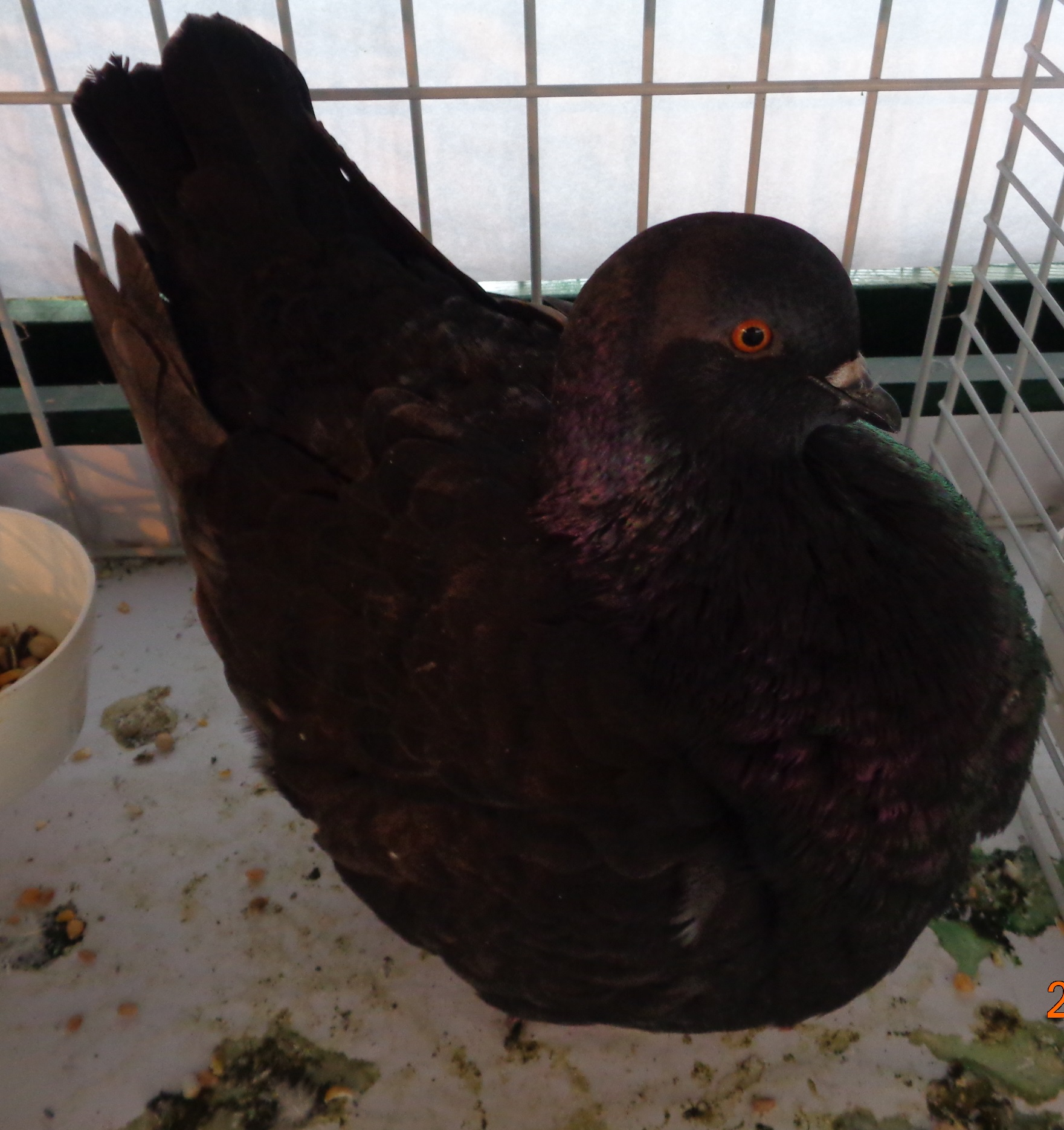
Black

== See also ==
- Pigeon Diet
- Pigeon Housing
- List of pigeon breeds
