= Maltese pigeon =

Breed of pigeon

Maltese
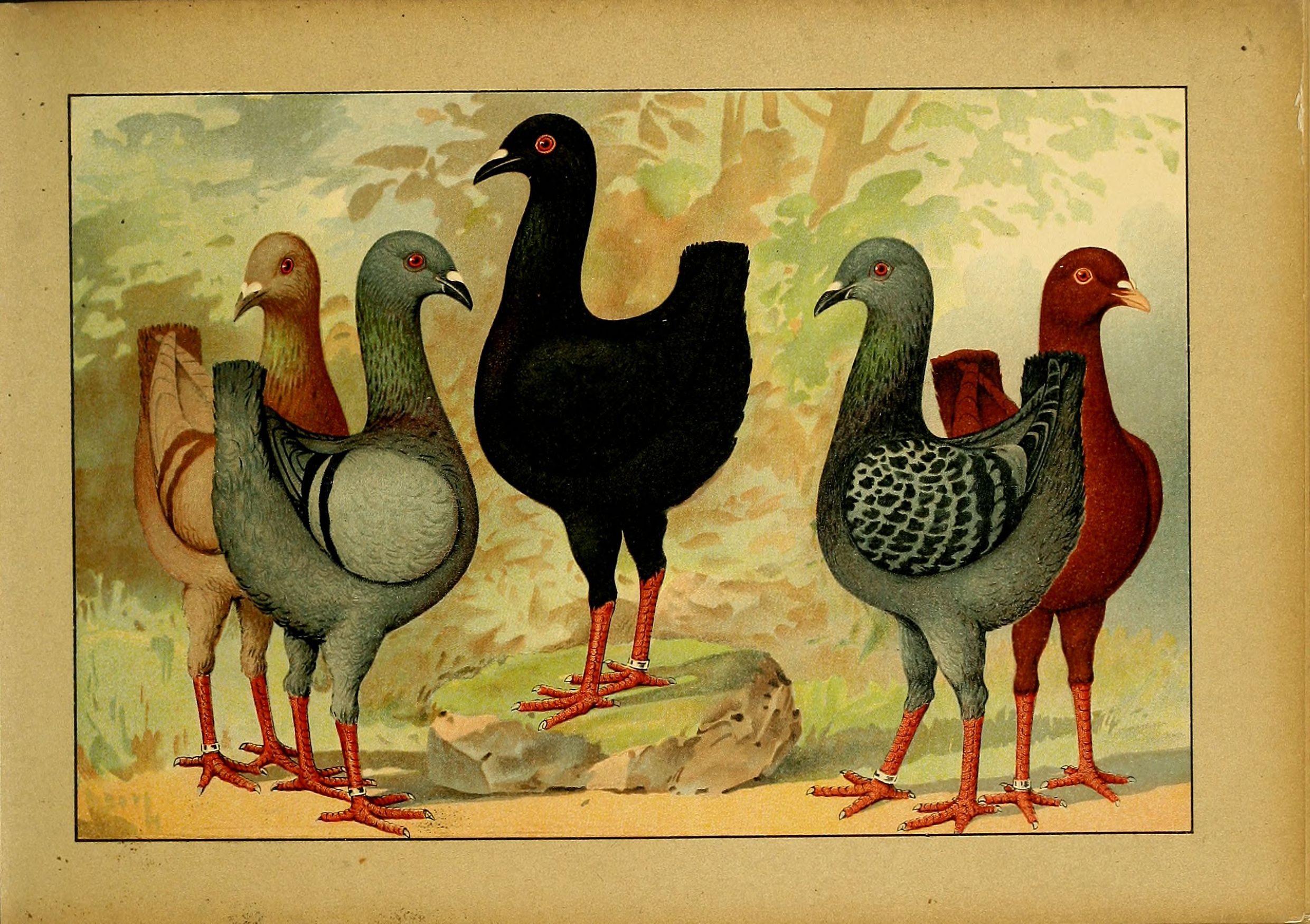
- Group of Maltese Pigeons
- Conservation status: Rare
- Other names: Maltese Hen
- Country of origin: Italy

Traits
- Crest type: None
- Feather ornamentation: None

Classification
- Australian Breed Group: Utility
- US Breed Group: Form
- EE Breed Group: Huhntauben

The Maltese pigeon is a breed of fancy pigeon developed over many years of selective breeding. The Maltese, along with other varieties of domesticated pigeons, are all descendants from the rock pigeon (Columba livia). It is a radical departure from the common type of pigeon, in that it stands high on very long straight legs and has a long slender neck, making a "U" shape with its short tucked up body. An ideal specimen should stand sixteen (16) or more inches (almost 41 centimeters) in height. It is a rather poor flyer and likes to nest close to the ground. It was used extensively as a squab producer in the early 20th century. The Maltese is a splendid feeder, healthy, and takes good care of its young. As squab producers, they have few equals as to the size of the squab and especially the amount of meat on the breast. In this respect, the Maltese squab is more like a quail, only much larger. Squabs range in dressed weight from twelve to eighteen pounds to the dozen.

== Colors ==
The Maltese comes in a variety of colors. They were classed as Black, Blue, Silver, Dun, Red, Yellow, White & A. O. C. at the National Pigeon Association (NPA) 1928 show. These classes remain the same into this century.

== Status ==
It is indeed a very rare pigeon breed in the United States. It is promoted by the Rare Breeds Pigeon club, but has not been shown in any large show in recent years.

== Origin ==
The origin of the Maltese like many other varieties appears to have no exact starting point. But because of its historic name -Maltese Hen.- it is attributed to Malta, an island in the Mediterranean just off Italy. They found their way into Germany through Italy by 1850, and became a popular squabbing breed in the U.S. around 1900. Wendell Levi, author of many pigeon related books and articles and owner of one of the largest squab producing plants in the U.S., believes that the Maltese is of recent origin, being developed in Austria around 1890. His view is by all means not universally accepted. William Corb imported the first Maltese into the U.S. in 1889 from Germany, which may explain Levi's belief. Several writers in the American Pigeon Journal have traced the breed back even further. The most extensive article traces it back to India.

== Basic needs ==
Pigeons are fed either a raw whole grain or a pellet mix designed specifically for pigeons. There are mixes on the market designed specifically for pigeons. Inorganic materials are also needed in their diets, including salts, minerals, and calcium. Mixes made specifically for pigeons are readily available, called pigeon grit. Clean water is naturally also required. Pigeons suck water to drink, as you do with a straw. A container with at least one inch or more of free standing water is perfect.

== Gallery ==
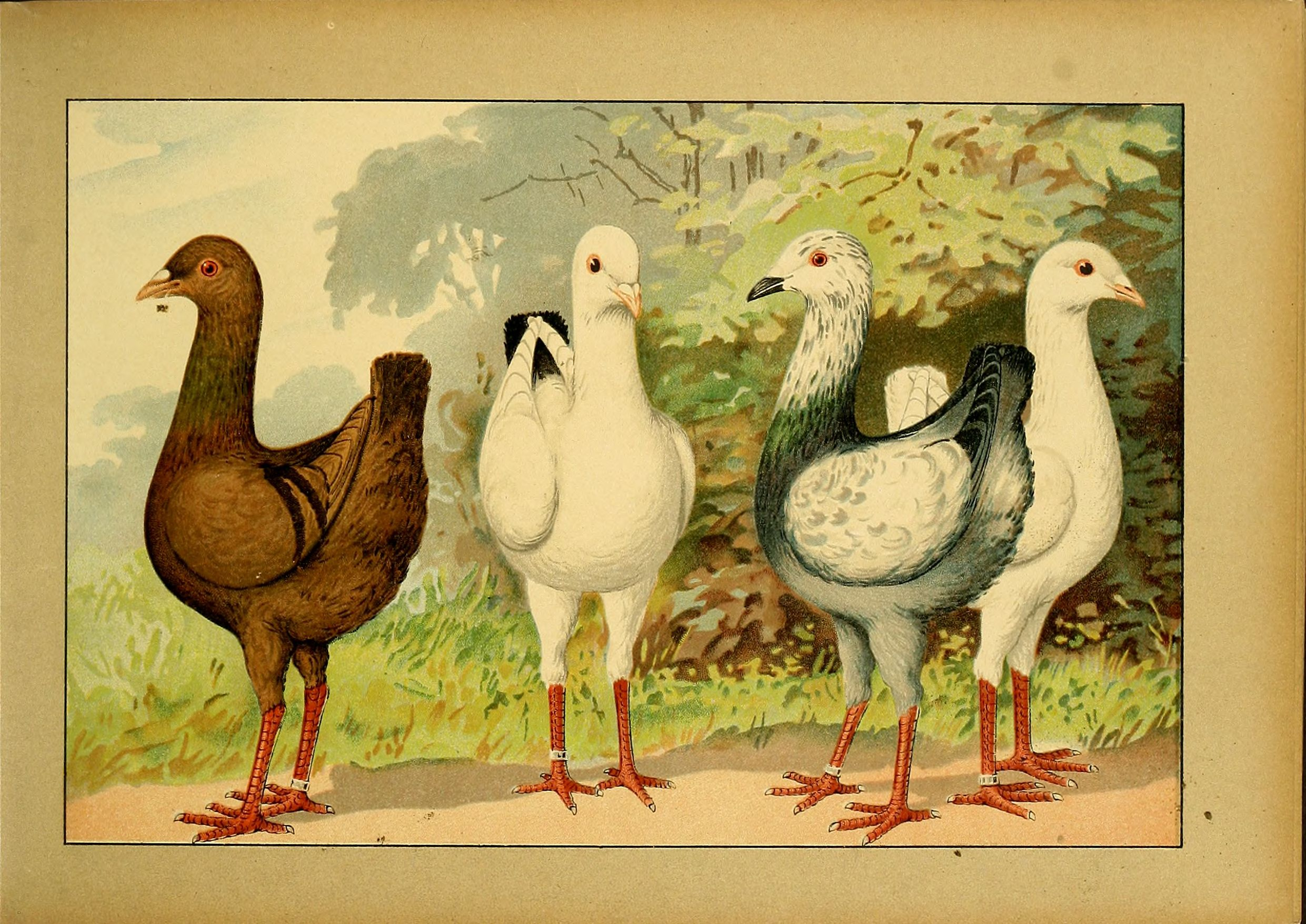
Maltese Group

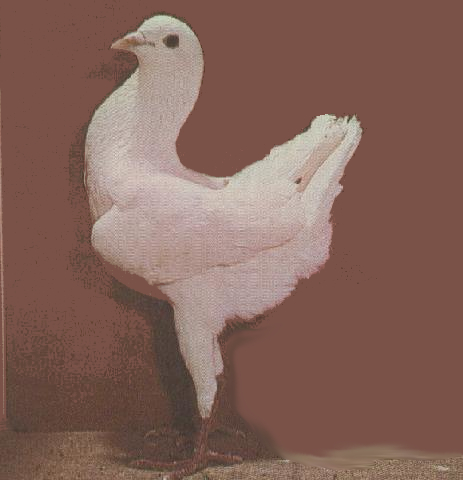
Maltese White

== See also ==
- List of pigeon breeds
- American Pigeon Journal 1938 01
- American Pigeon Journal 1938 05
- American Pigeon Journal January 1941
- American Pigeon Journal September 1951
