= American Domestic Show Flight =

Breed of pigeon

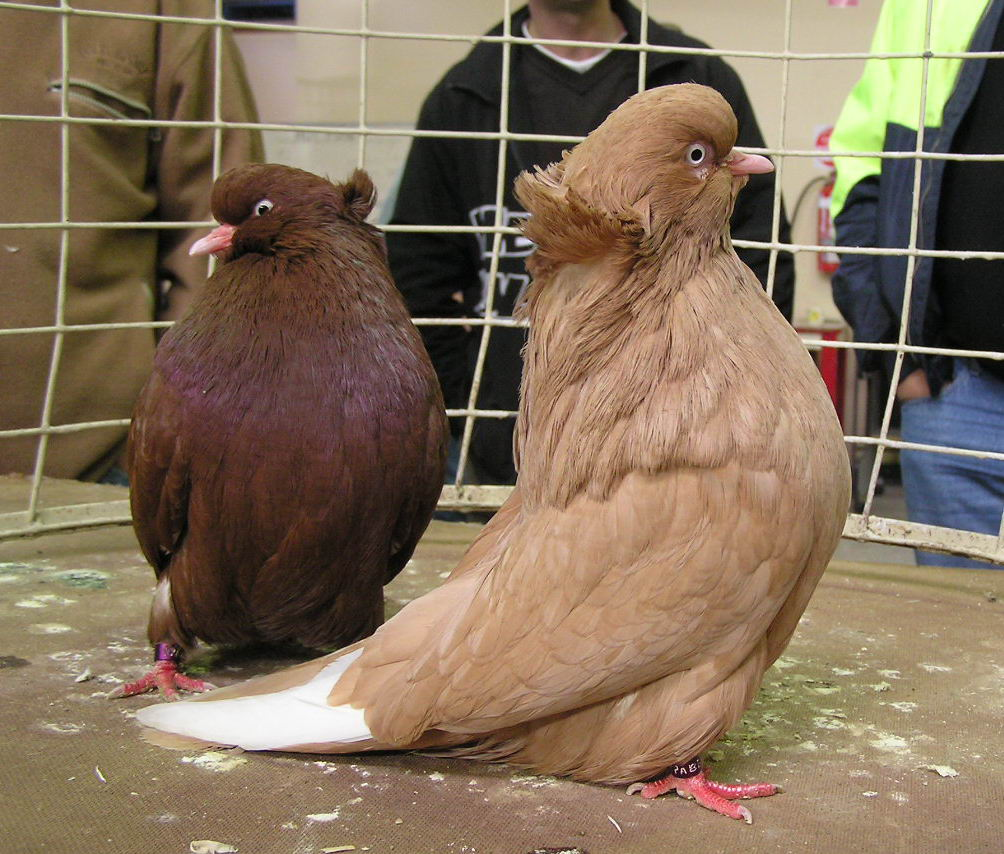
- American Domestic Show Flight
- Conservation status: Common
- Other names: Domestic Show Flight
- Country of origin: United States

Traits
- Crest type: optional

Classification
- Australian Breed Group: Domestic Show Flight: Group 6
- US Breed Group: American Domestic Show Flight: Tumblers, Rollers and High Flyers
- EE Breed Group: Domestic Show Flight: Tümmlertauben

Notes
- Originated in New York

The American Domestic Show Flight is a breed of fancy pigeon developed over many years of selective breeding. Domestic Show Flights, along with other varieties of domestic pigeons, are all descendants from the rock pigeon (Columba livia). The Domestic Show Flight is a relatively recent American creation which was developed in the state of New York. it became quite a popular breed and The American Pigeon Journal published several special issue devoted to the breed.

== History ==
Many believe that the American Domestic Show Flight was first bred in Yorkville and the Brooklyn section of New York City proper. Its inception is traced back to 1880 when a Long Faced Hollander, from Germany, was crossed with the small English Magpie, forming the foundation of the present day American Domestic Show Flight. Some others, including Alex Rawson, a prominent breeder in the 1950's, believe that they were instead originally developed in Germany, and called the Hanover. Whichever the case, American breeders quickly took to these birds. Early breeders around 1900's were thriving all through Long Island and New Jersey and soon began breeding them to become as a show specimen as well as a flier.

As a flier they were flown competitively in the sport of triganorio, originating in Modena Italy.

The original breeds used in their development are present today but have taken entirely different courses. The Magpie is often seen at the larger shows, while the Long Faced Hollander and Hanover have been lost in obscurity. The Domestic Flight of the 1930's retains very little of its original appearance, but the changes to come were drastic indeed. A standard was adopted during 1953, which would greatly modify the breeds characteristics. And changed again in 1970 and yet again in 1988.

== Gallery ==
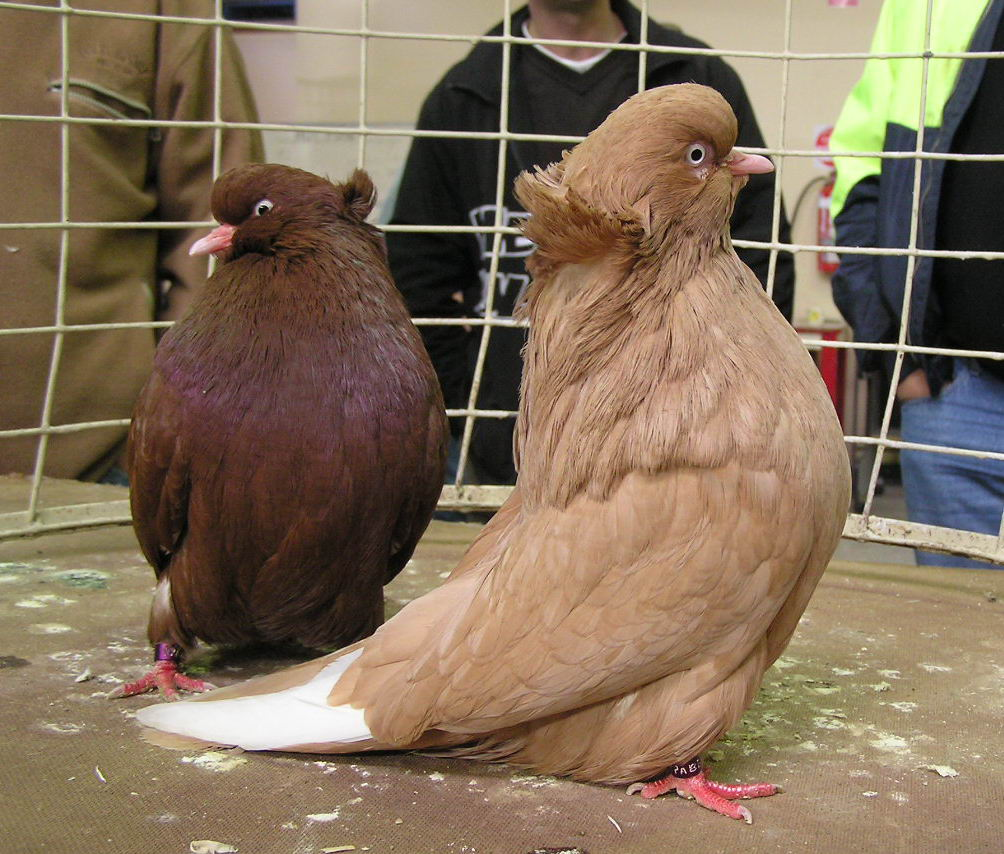

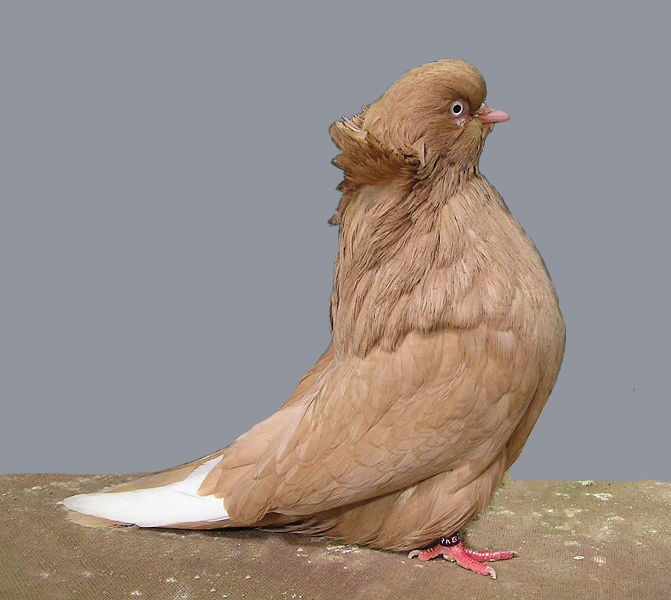

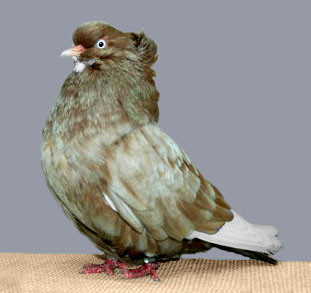

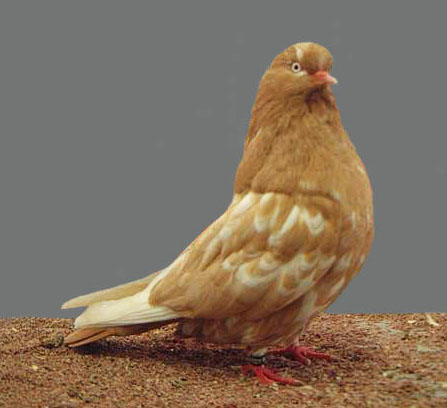

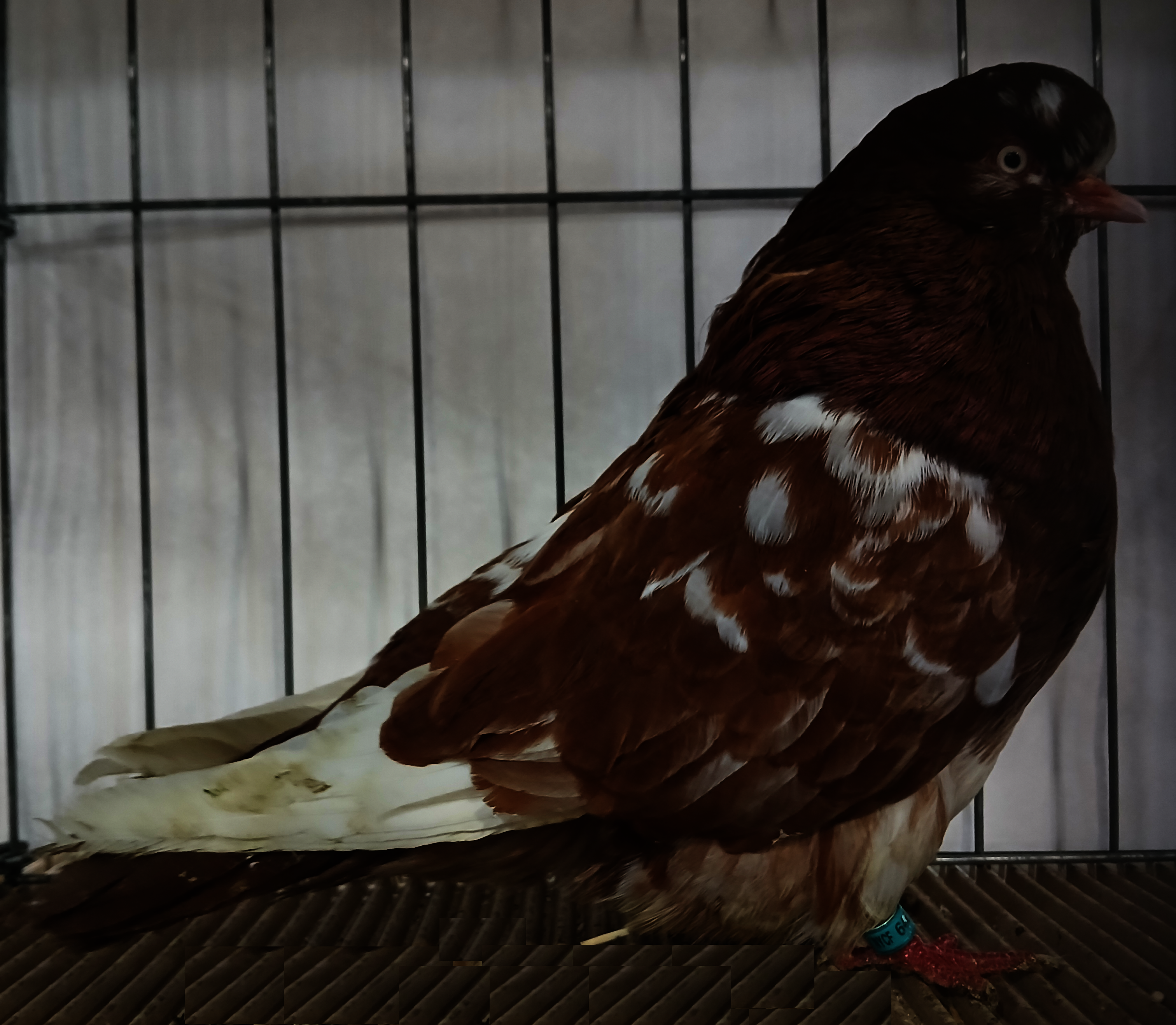
Red spangle

== See also ==
- List of pigeon breeds
- Pigeon keeping
