= African Owl pigeon =

Breed of pigeon

African Owl
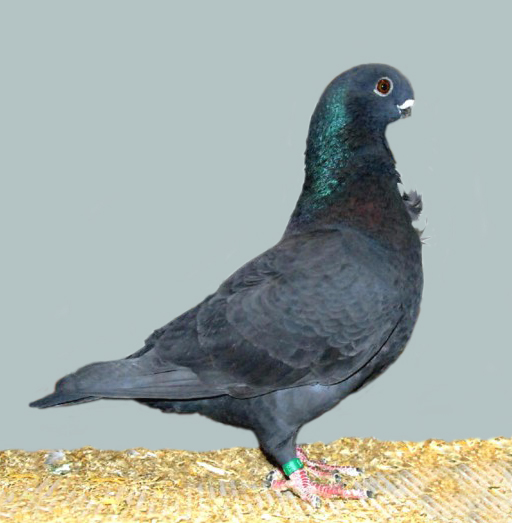
- Black Self African Owl
- Conservation status: Common
- Other names: Einfarbige Mövchen

Traits
- Feather ornamentation: Jabot on neck

Classification
- Australian Breed Group: Group 3
- US Breed Group: Fancy
- EE Breed Group: Mövchentuaben

The African Owl is a breed of fancy pigeon developed over many years of selective breeding. They originated in Tunisia (Africa), and were imported into England during the 19th century. The breed is known for its short beak, which gives the breed the "Owl" name due to the size and shape.

== Description ==
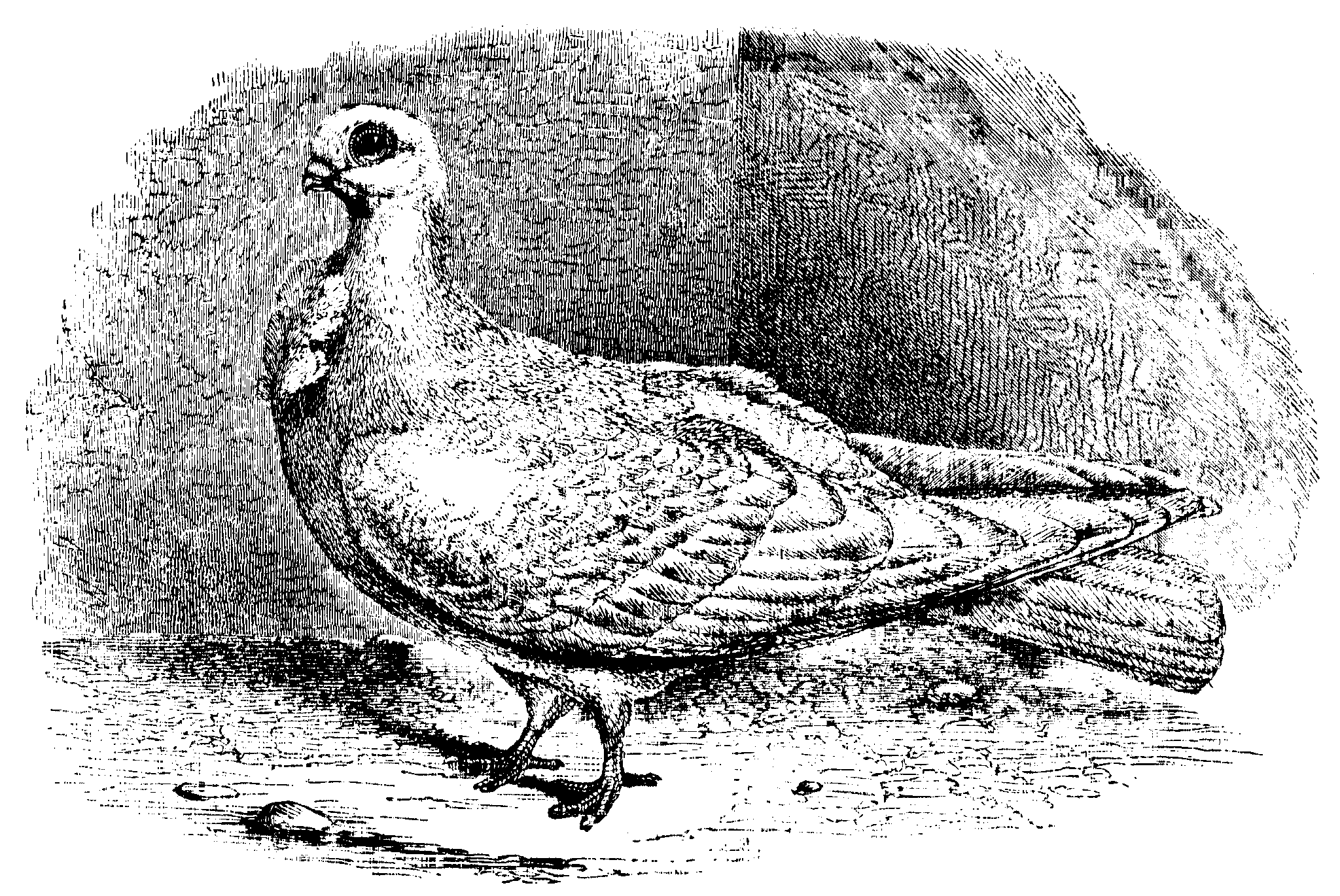
An African Owl, as published in The Variation of Animals and Plants Under Domestication by Charles Darwin in 1868

A breed of fancy pigeon developed by selective breeding, it has descended from the rock dove as with other types of domesticated pigeons; it is thought to have first been brought into Europe from Tunis, Africa, where the type originated and were first imported into England in the late 19th century. They were originally referred to as "Foreign Owls", as a similar type of pigeon had already been known in England, which upon the importation of the African Owl became known as the "English Owl". The main difference between the two types of owl was that the African or "Foreign" variety was noticeably smaller.

As with other types of "owl" pigeons, the African Owl has a crest of feathers running down the front of its breast, which is called the jabot, also known as a tie or cravat. The body of an African Owl is short and plump, and the head is smooth and unadorned with rough feathers. The beak of this breed is short and stout, and it is this beak which gives the Owl type their name, being turned down in shape.

Lewis Wright wrote in The Practical Pigeon Keeper of the delicate nature of these types of pigeons; "Foreign Owls require to have their lofts well ventilated, yet perfectly free from damp and draught, else they die by dozens: in fact, they are at the best exceedingly delicate birds."

== Gallery ==
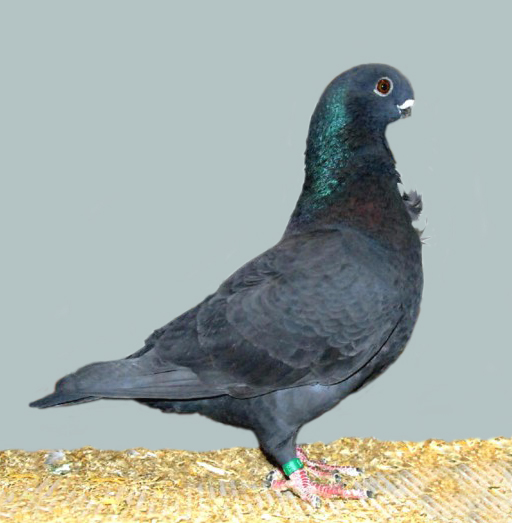
Black

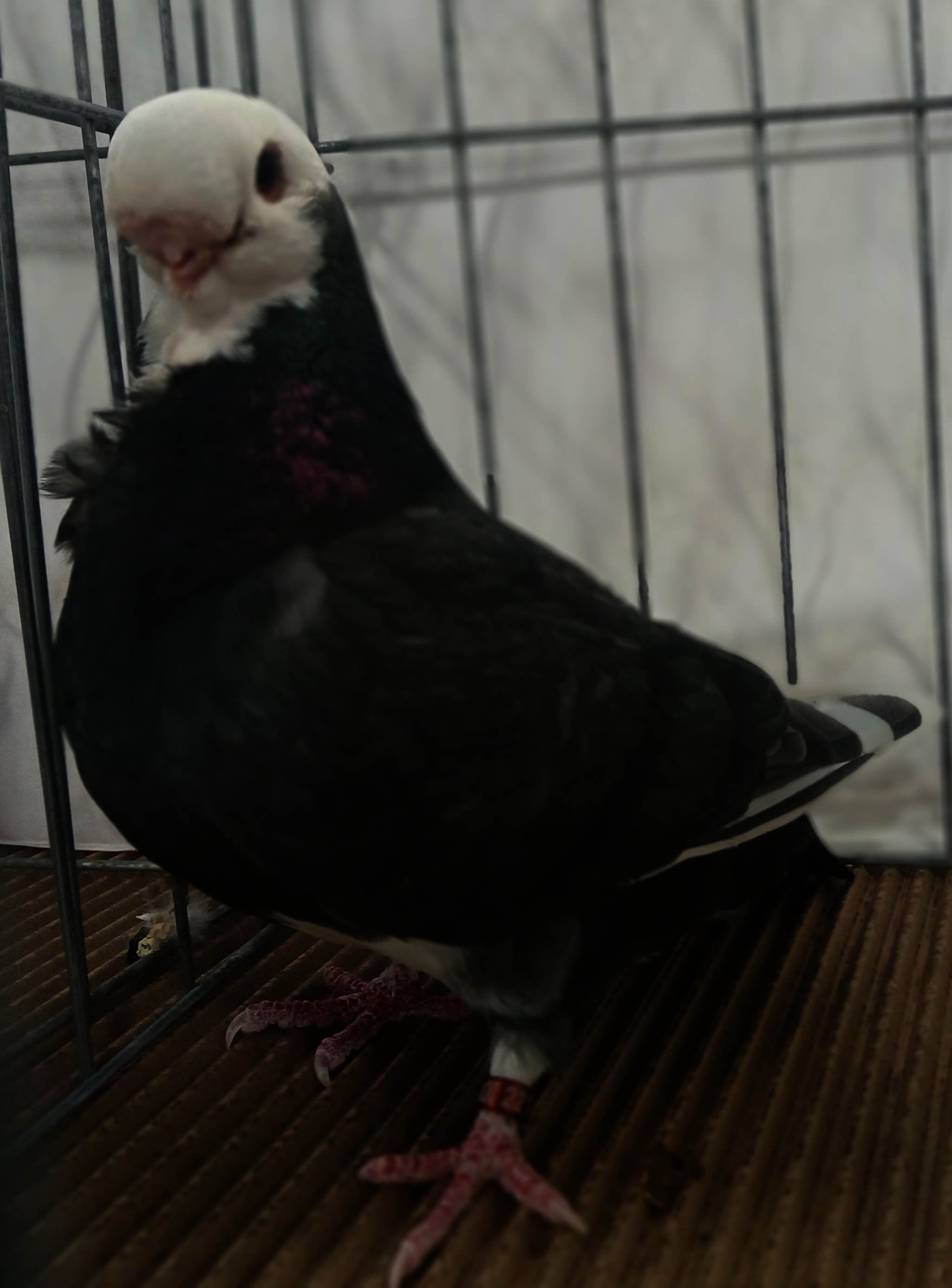
Black baldhead

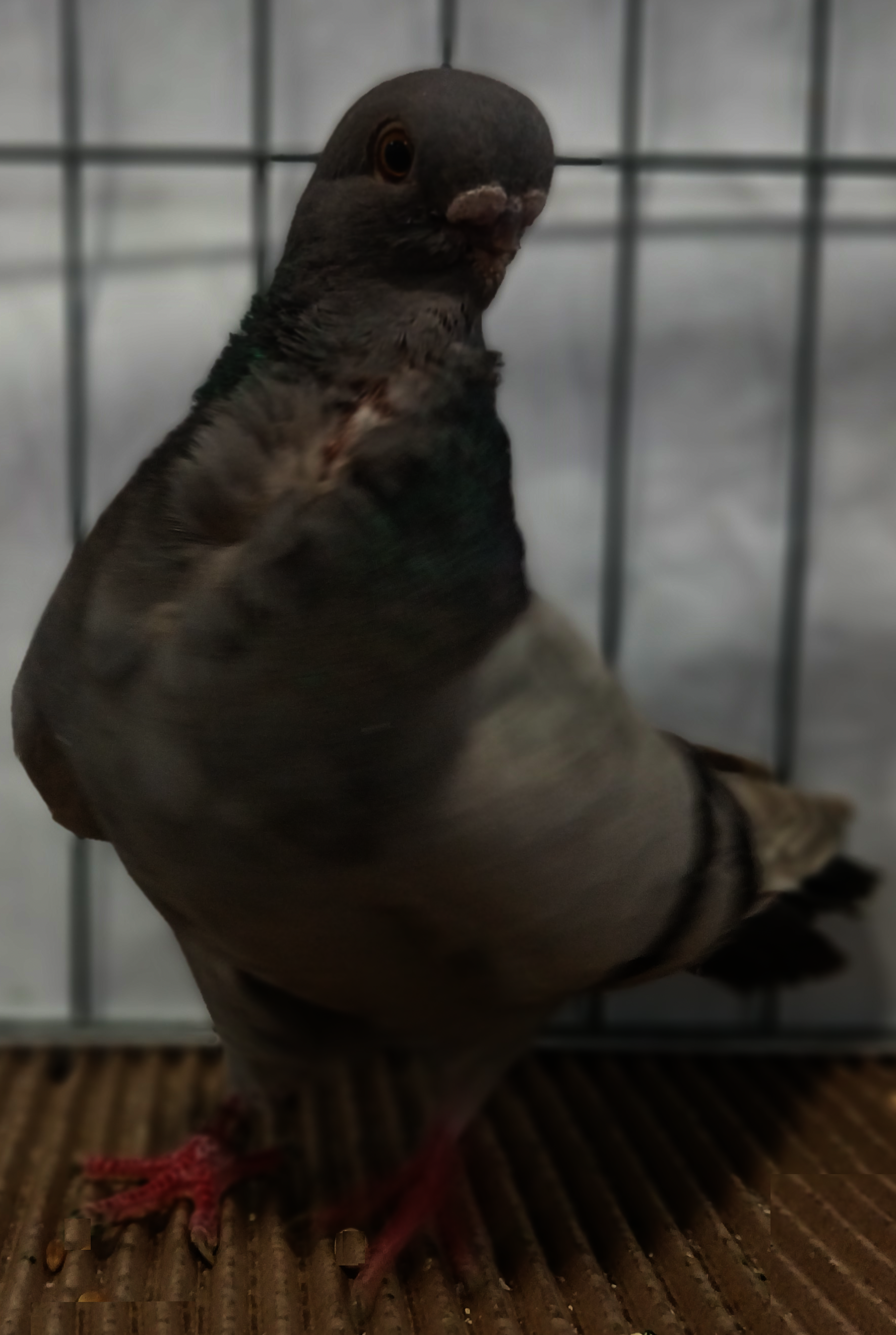
Brown bar

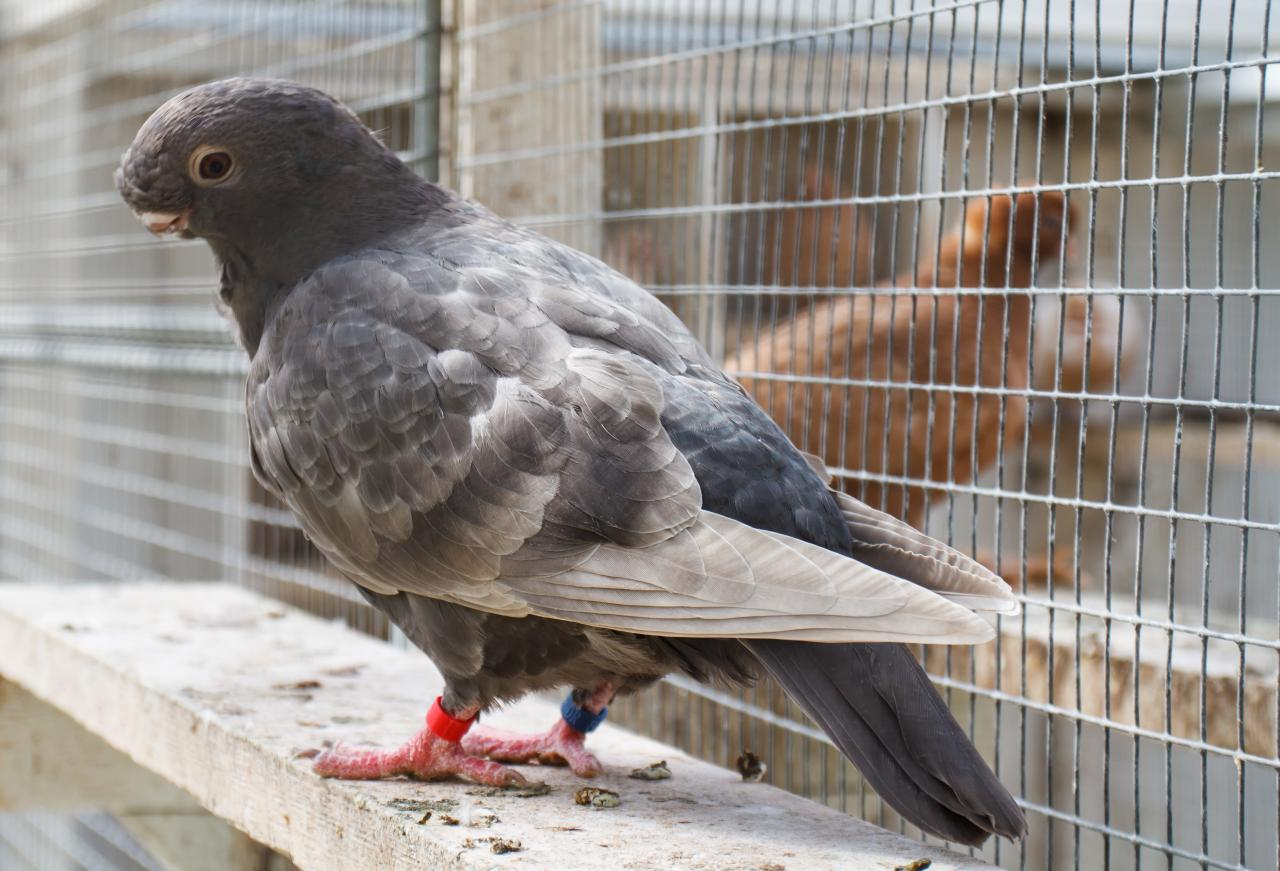
Dun

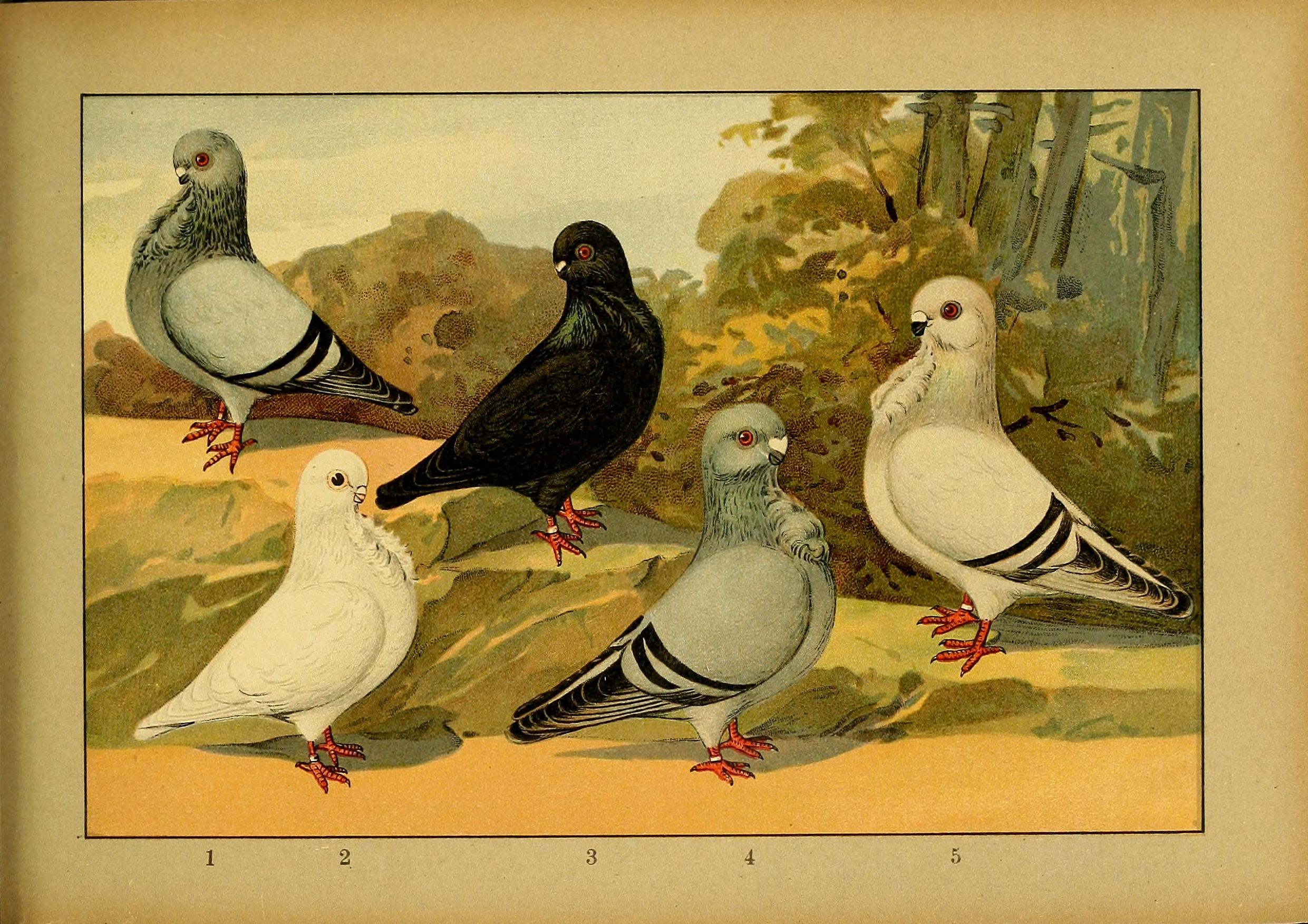
Schachtzabel 1906 Tafel 75

== See also ==
- List of pigeon breeds
- Pigeon keeping
  - Pigeon Diet
  - Pigeon Housing
- Media related to African Owl at Wikimedia Commons
