= Coburg Lark pigeon =

Breed of pigeon

Coburg Lark
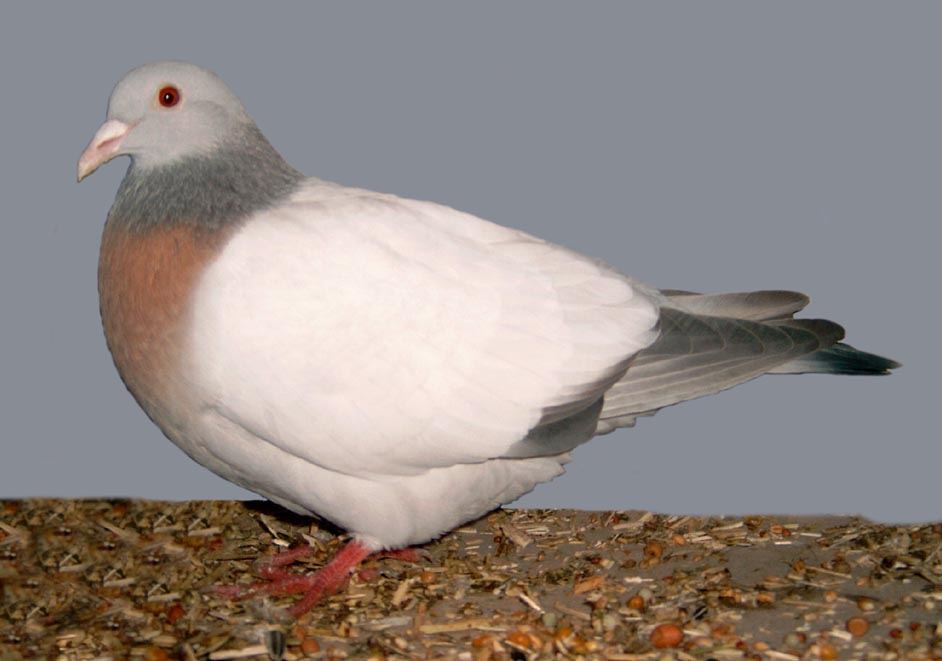
- Coburg Lark
- Conservation status: rare

Traits
- Crest type: None
- Feather ornamentation: None

Classification
- Australian Breed Group: Group 8 Utility
- US Breed Group: form
- EE Breed Group: form

Notes
- It is now often found in the Color Pigeon group, rarely used for utility purposes

The Coburg Lark is a breed of fancy pigeon. Coburg Larks, along with other varieties of domesticated pigeons, are all descendants of rock pigeons (Columba livia).

== History ==
The Coburg Lark is a product of pure German Design, originating from a crossing of Archangels, from which it gets it unique coloring, and the Neurenberg Bagadett.

== See also ==
- List of pigeon breeds
