= King pigeon =

Breed of pigeon

King
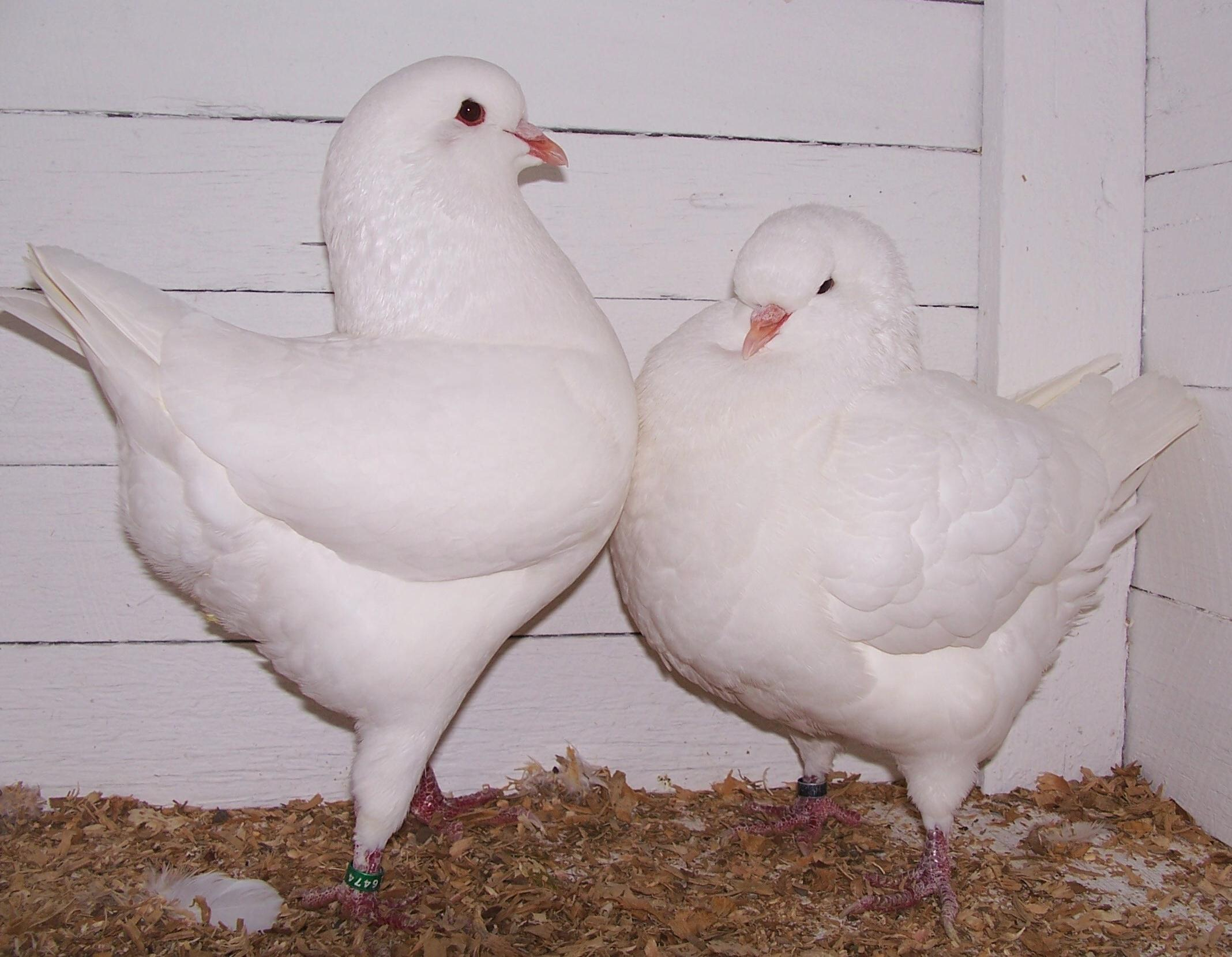
- A pair of white Kings
- Conservation status: Common
- Country of origin: United States

Classification
- Australian Breed Group: Utility Group9
- US Breed Group: Utility
- EE Breed Group: Hen Pigeons

The King pigeon is a breed of pigeon developed over many years of selective breeding primarily as a utility breed.

Harry Baker, created the first Kings through planned breeding . What Harry needed was a bird that was both beautiful and productive. Productive at this time meant to be eaten. Kings along with other varieties of domesticated pigeons are all descendants from the rock dove (Columba livia).

The breed is known for its large size and suitability for squab production.

== Show Kings ==
The breed also has a variety bred for exhibition purposes at pigeon shows. It is called the Show King to distinguish it from the purely utility variety. The American Pigeon Journal even devoted special issues to the Show King for August 1938, June 1959, January 1964, and November 1970. The Show King is dual purpose and can be used for squab raising.

== History ==
The King is a dual purpose breed that originated in the United States. They were developed during the 1890s by crossing four older varieties: the Duchess for grace; the Homer for alertness; the Maltese for compactness and style; and the Runt for body and size.

== Roles with humans ==
=== Food ===
King pigeon meat is popular in cuisines of parts of China, North Africa, North America, and some European countries.

== Gallery ==
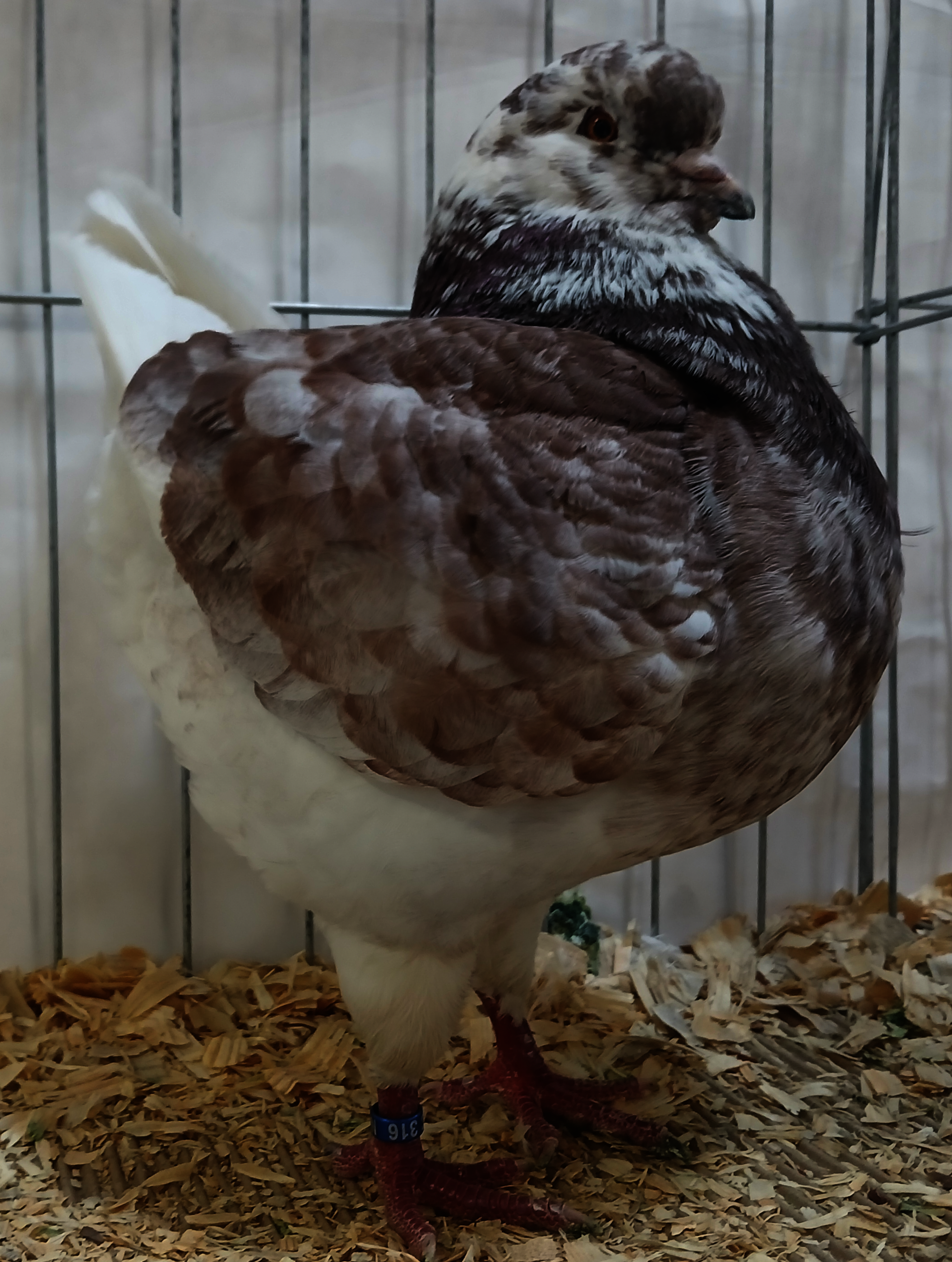
Red grizzle NPA National 2026

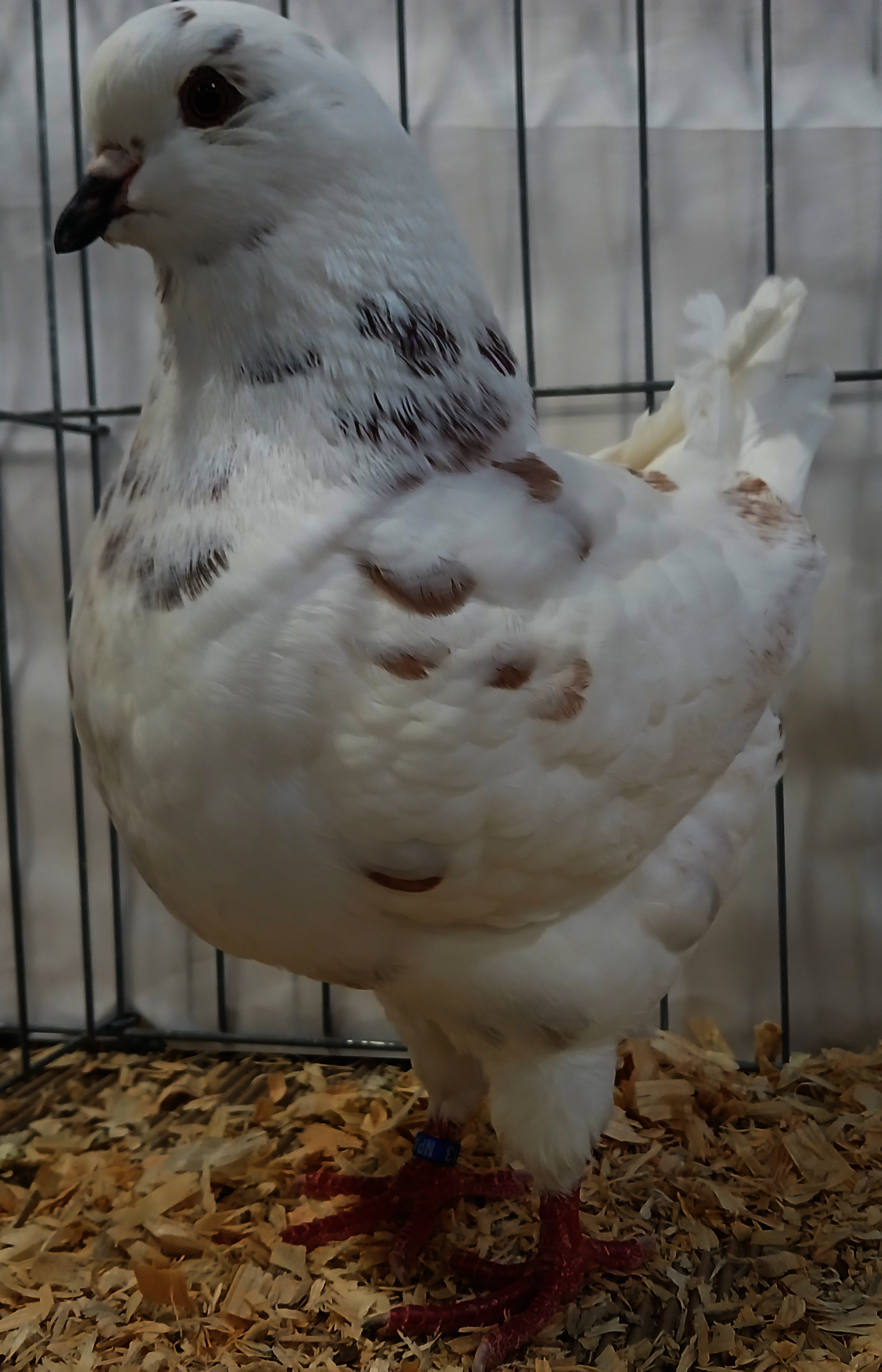
White mottled NPA National 2026

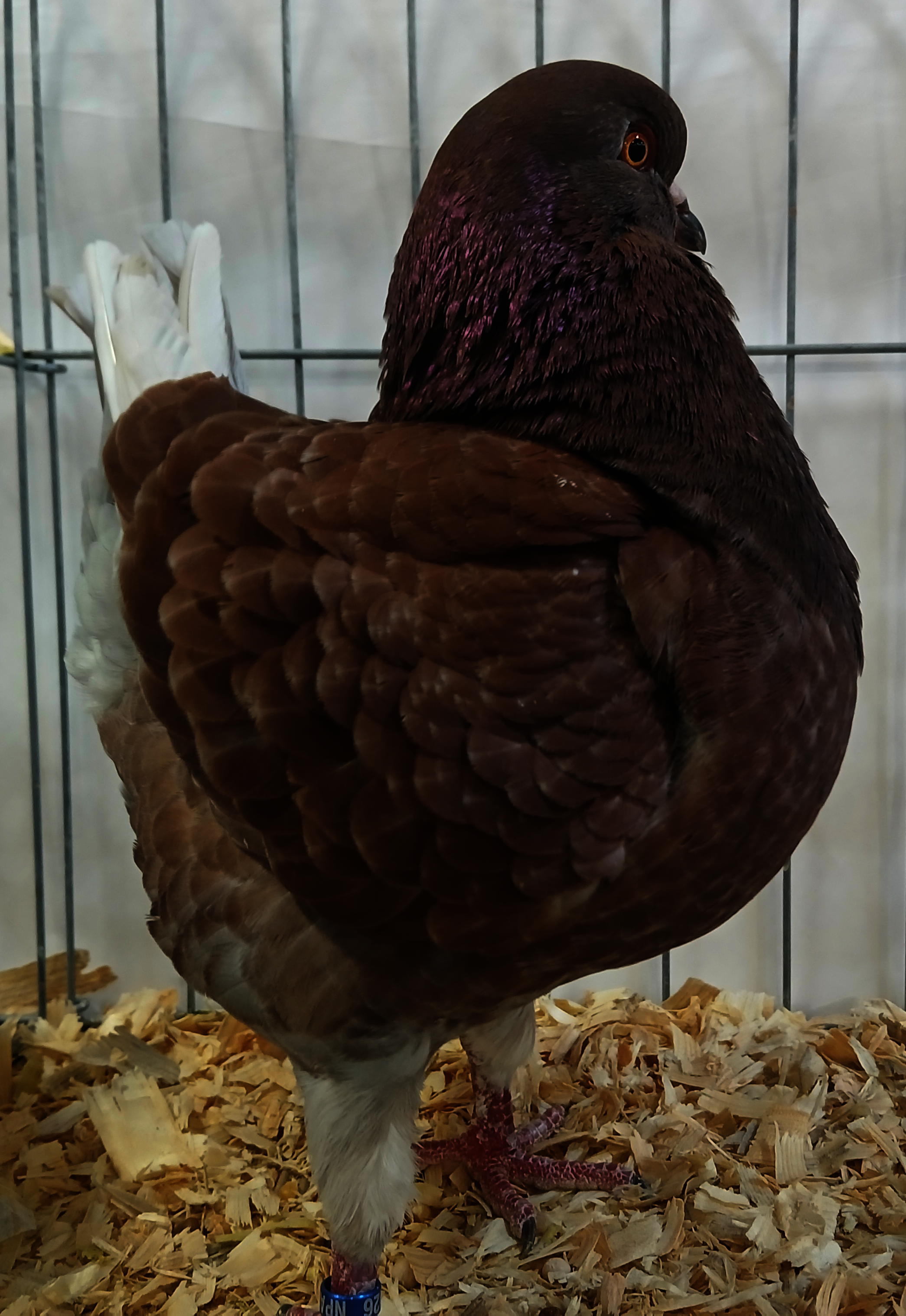
Red check NPA National 2026

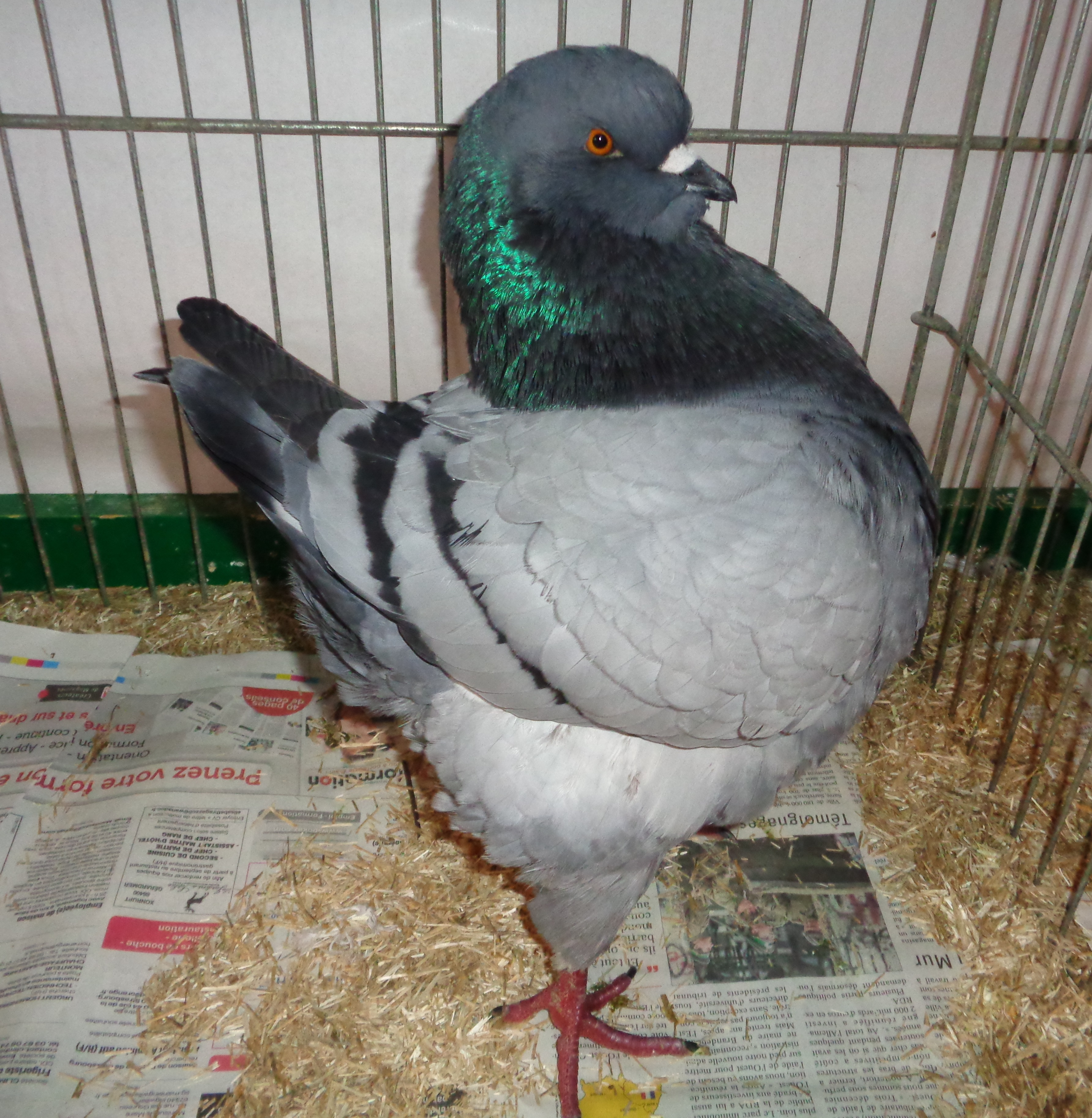
Blue bar King Pigeon

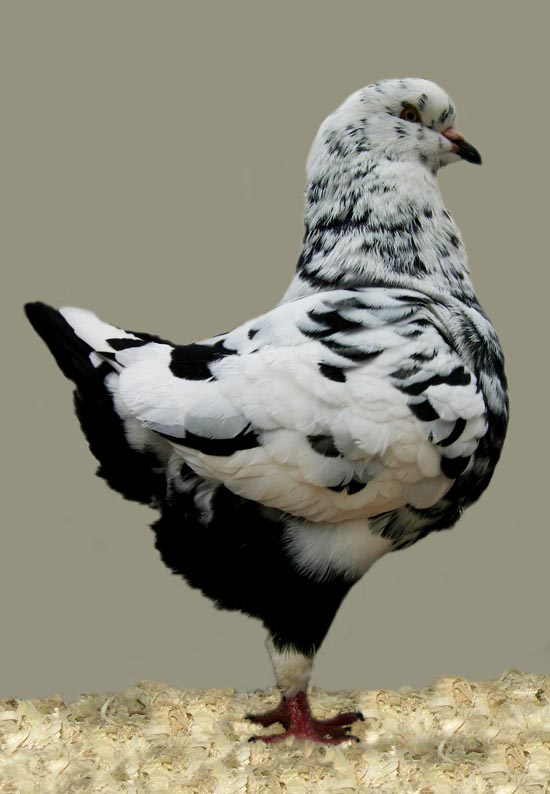
black tigered King

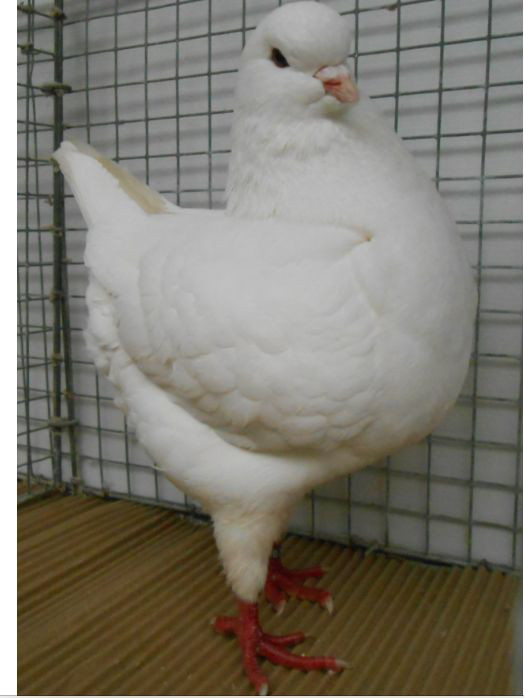
White King

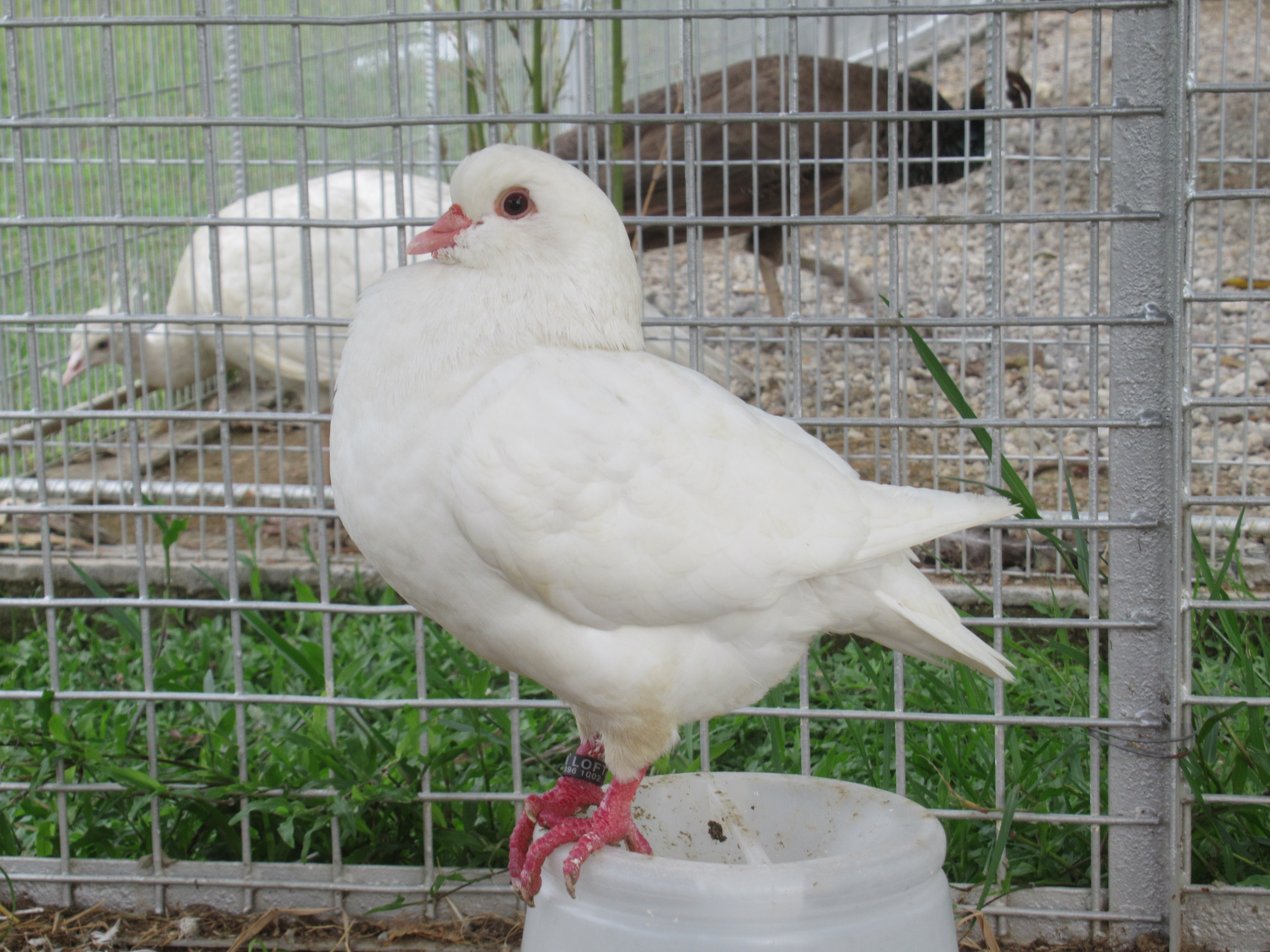
White King pigeon

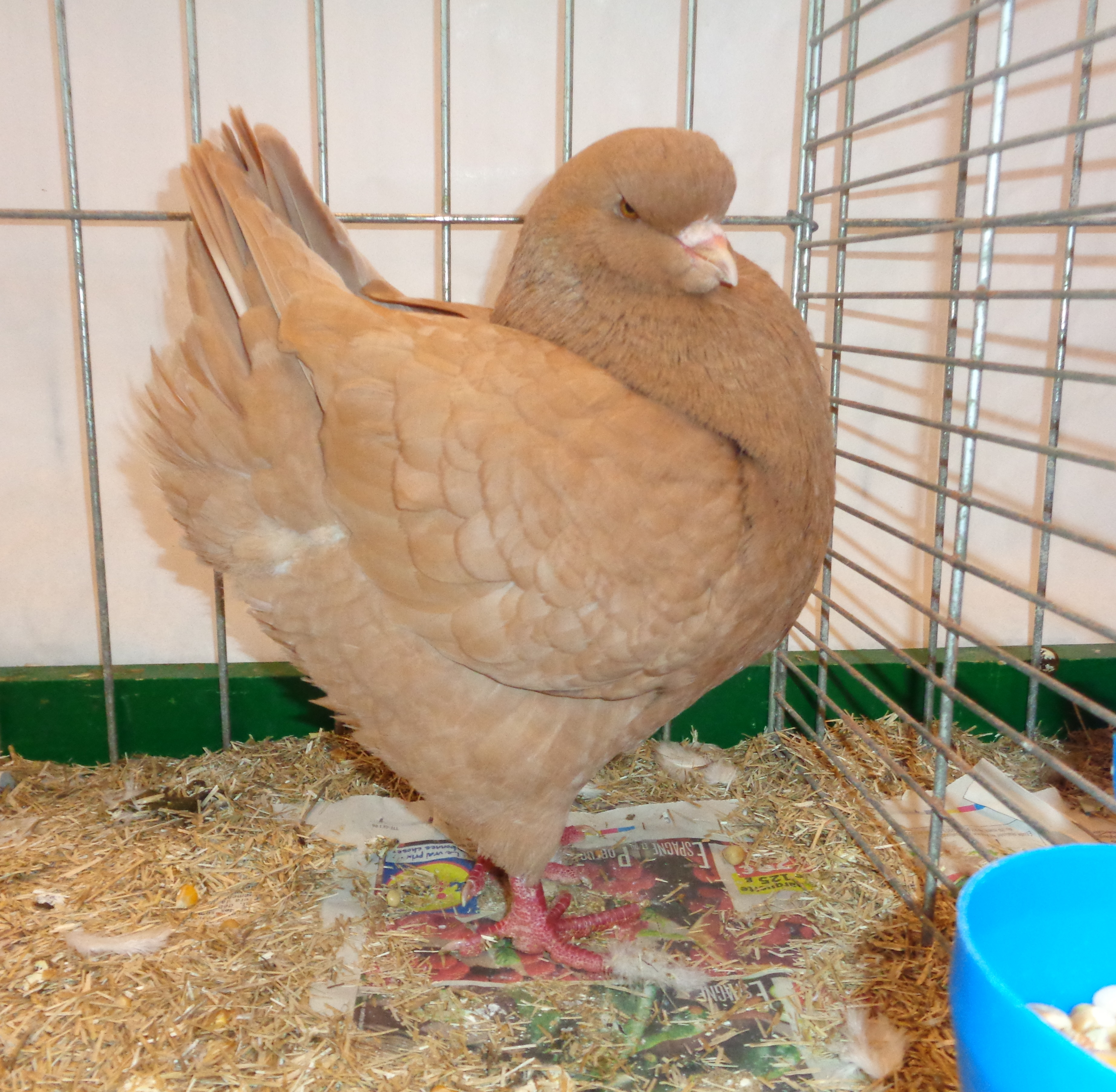
Yellow King

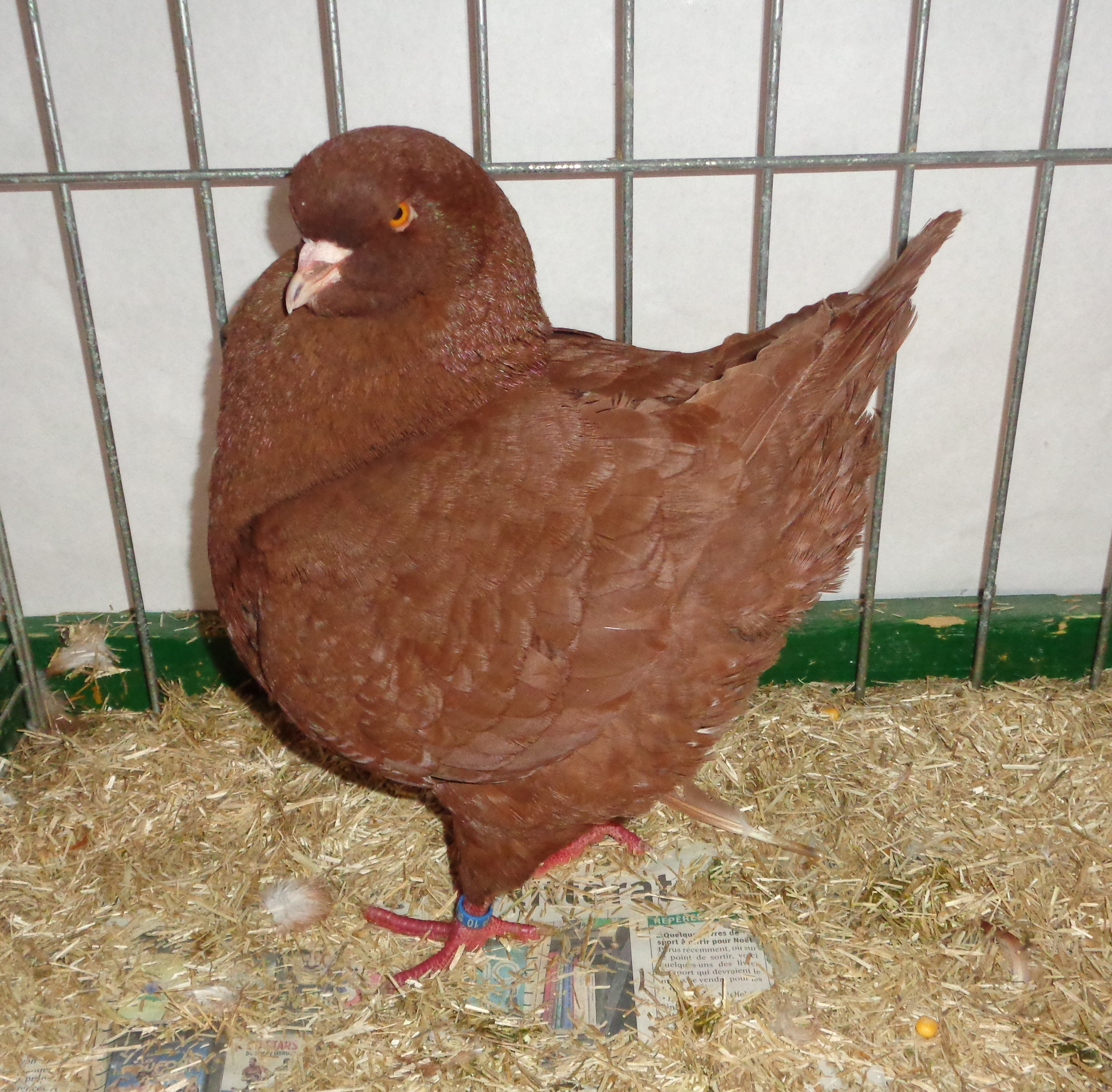
Red King

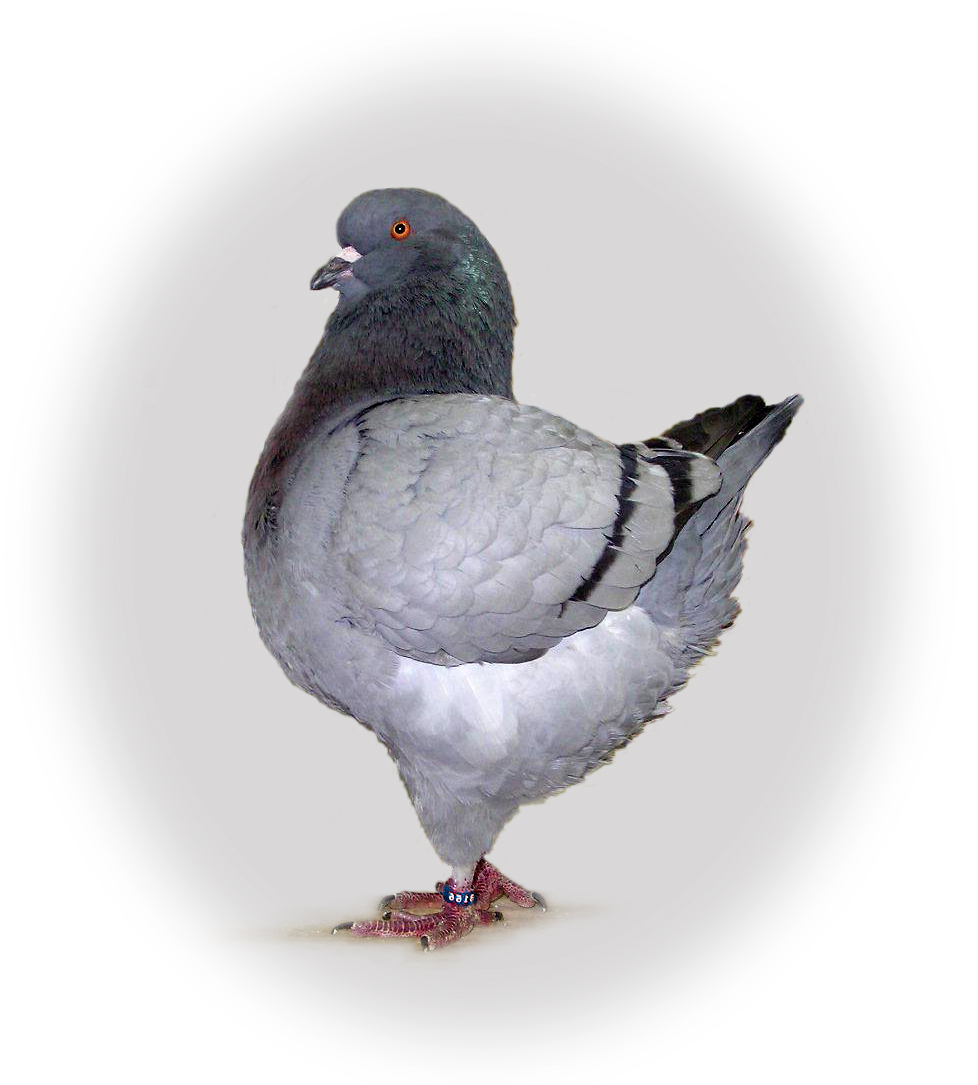
Blue Bar King

== See also ==
- Pigeon Diet
- Pigeon Housing
- Queen of Pigeons
- List of pigeon breeds
- | Standard of perfection
