= Stargard Shaker =

Breed of pigeon

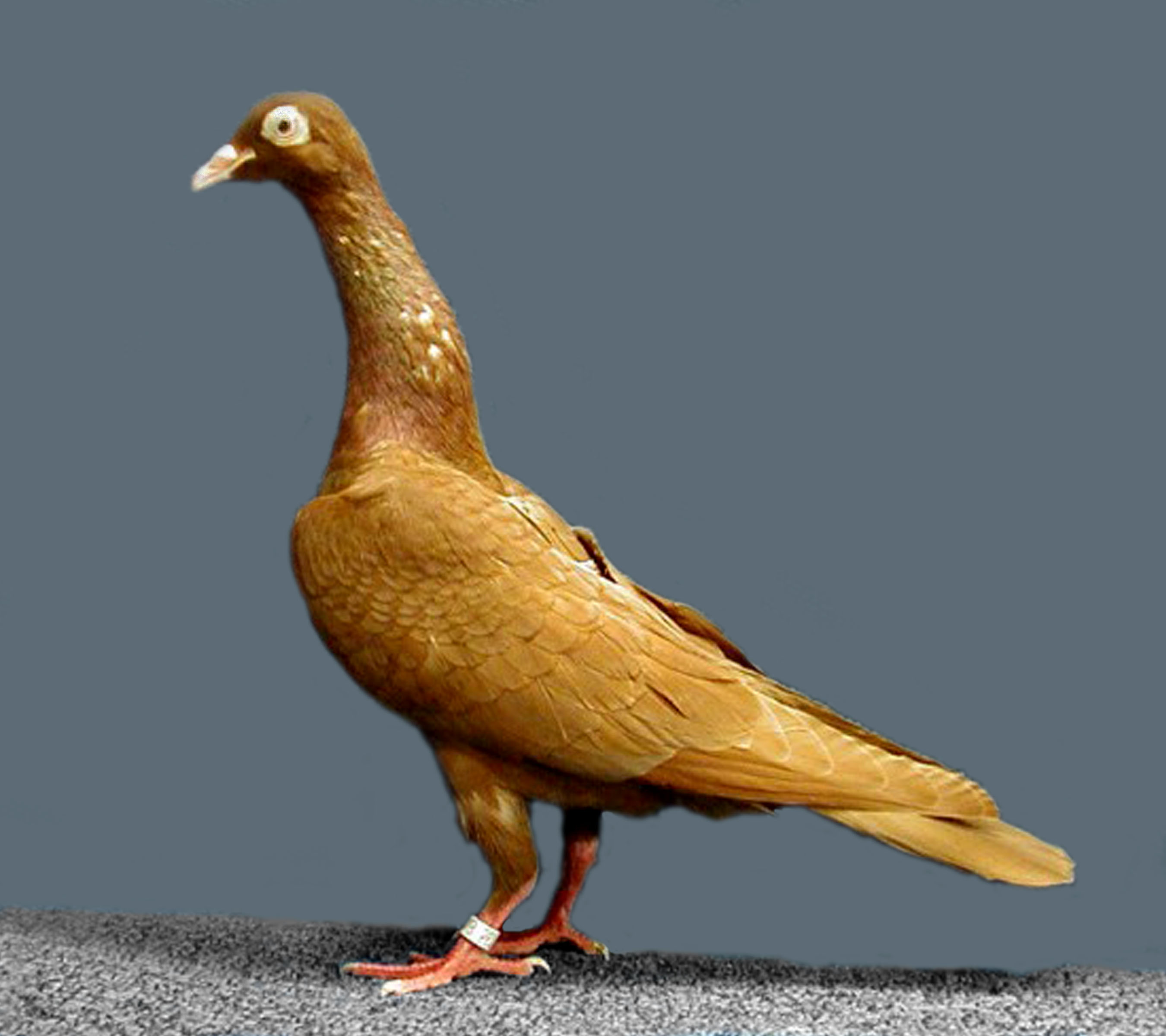
- Other names: Zitterhall
- Country of origin: Pomerania

Classification

The Stargard Shaker (Polish: Stargardzki pulsujący; German: Stargarder Zitterhals; French: Trembleur de Stargard), also called the Zitterhall (German: Zitterhals, sg. 'trembling neck pigeon', Zitterhälse, pl. 'trembling necks'), is a breed of fancy pigeon developed over many years of selective breeding. Originally developed in Pomerania.

According to the Entente Européenne d'Aviculture et de Cuniculture the breed is classed within the Tumblers and Highfliers group. Stargard Shakers have curved swan-like necks that tremble or shake in a way similar to Fantail pigeons. A Stargard Shaker was one of the champions at the Grand Nationals of the National Pigeon Association in 2007.

== Gallery ==
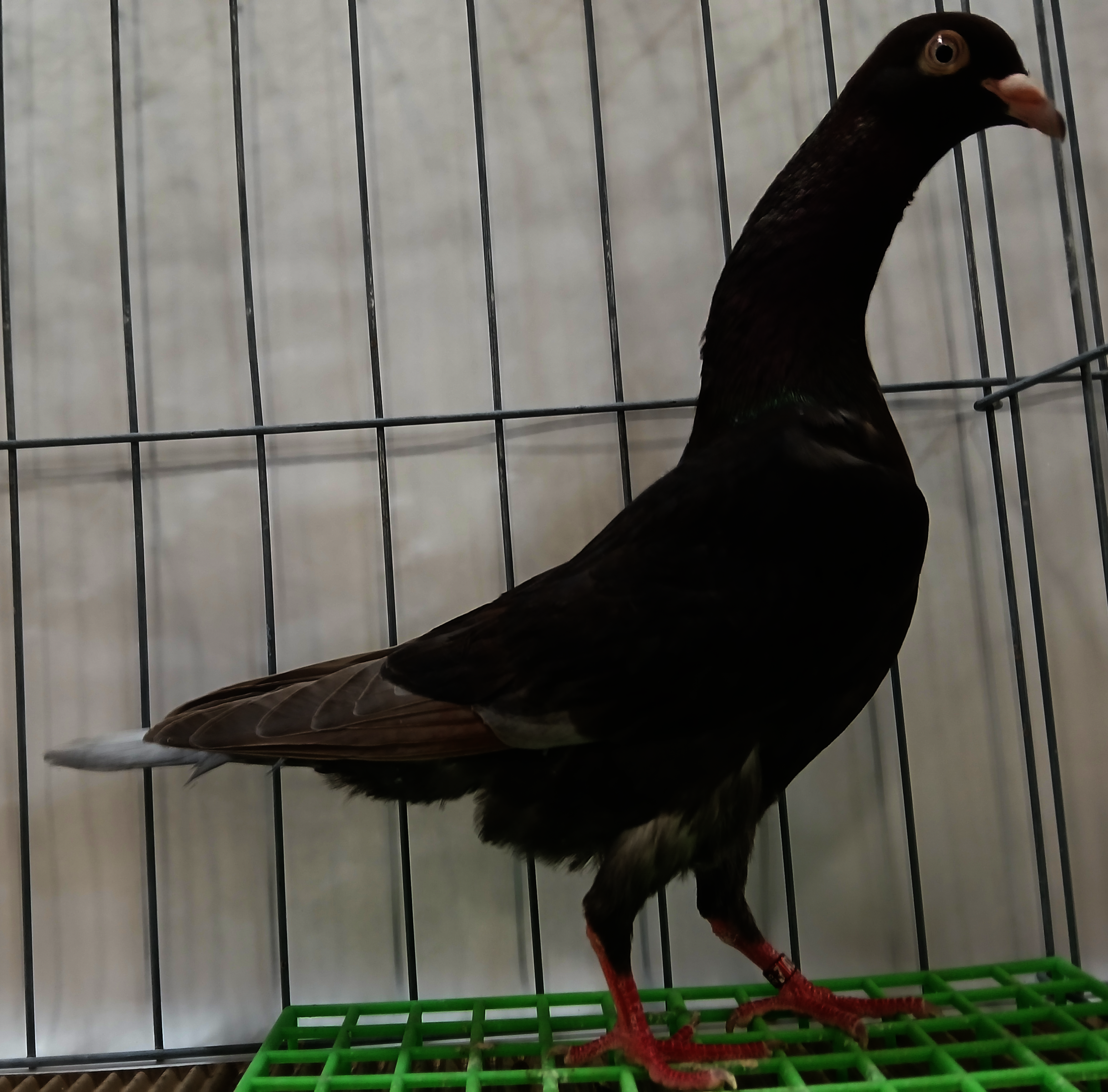

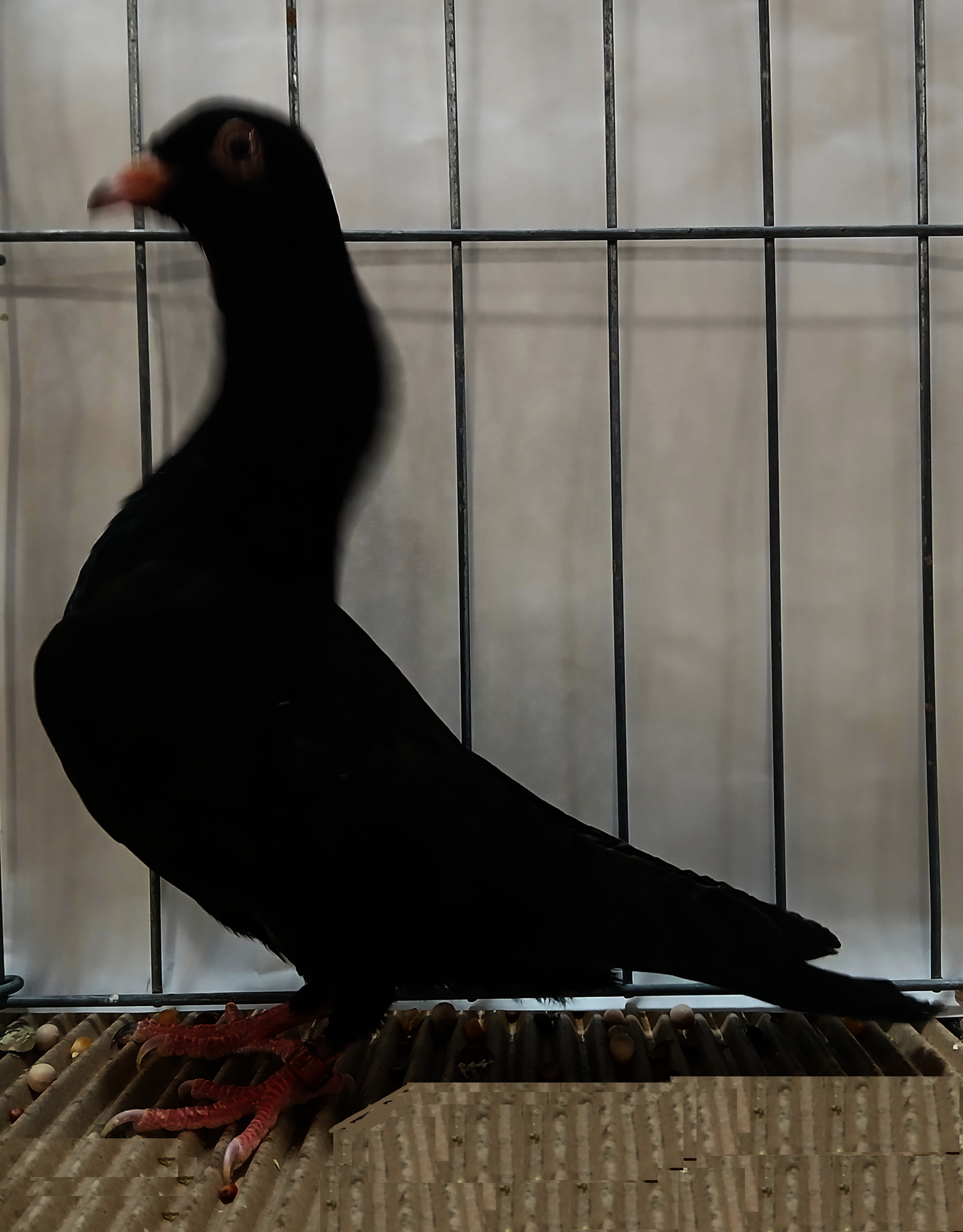

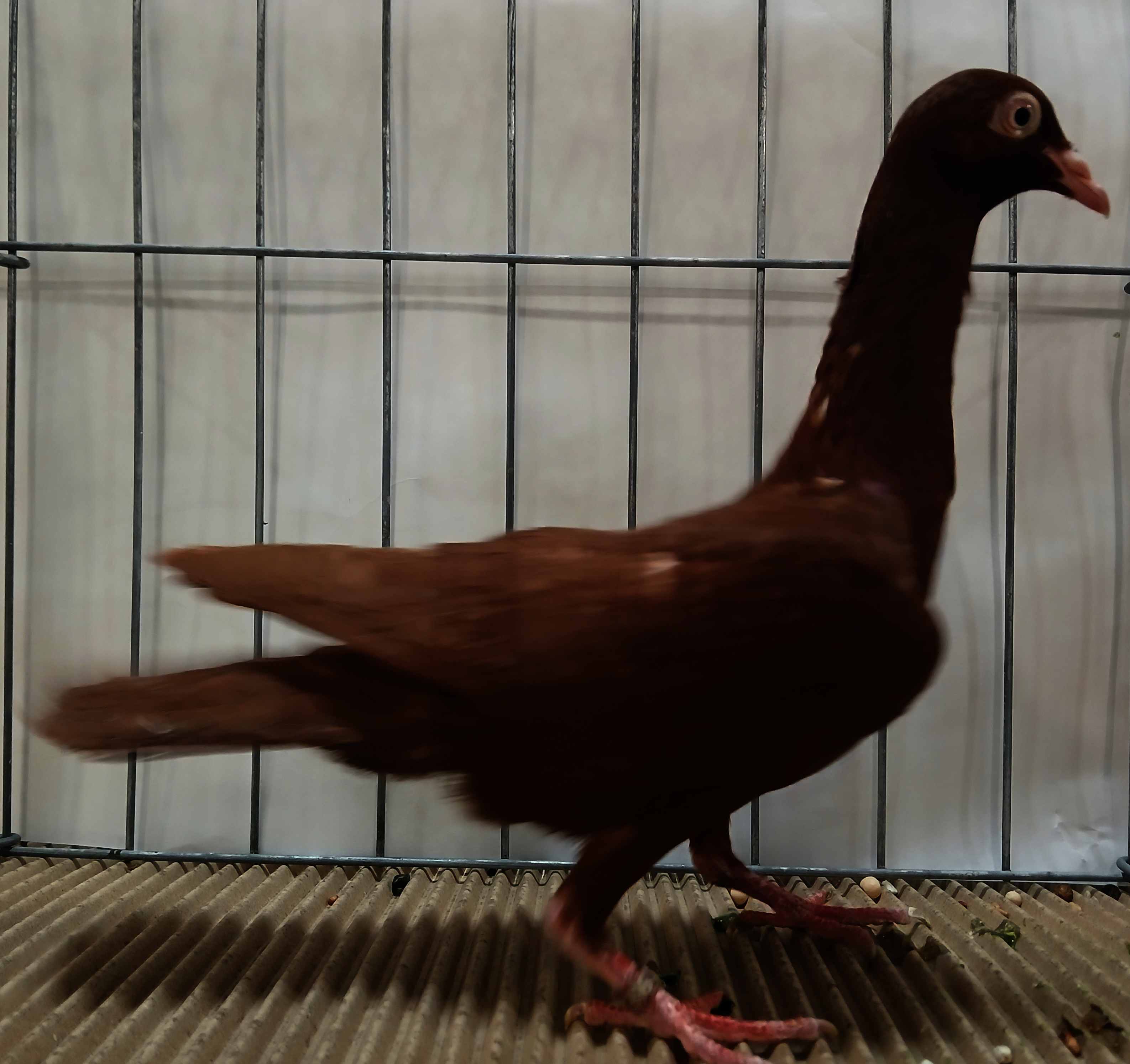

== See also ==
- Pigeon Diet
- Pigeon Housing
- List of pigeon breeds
