= Carneau =

Breed of pigeon

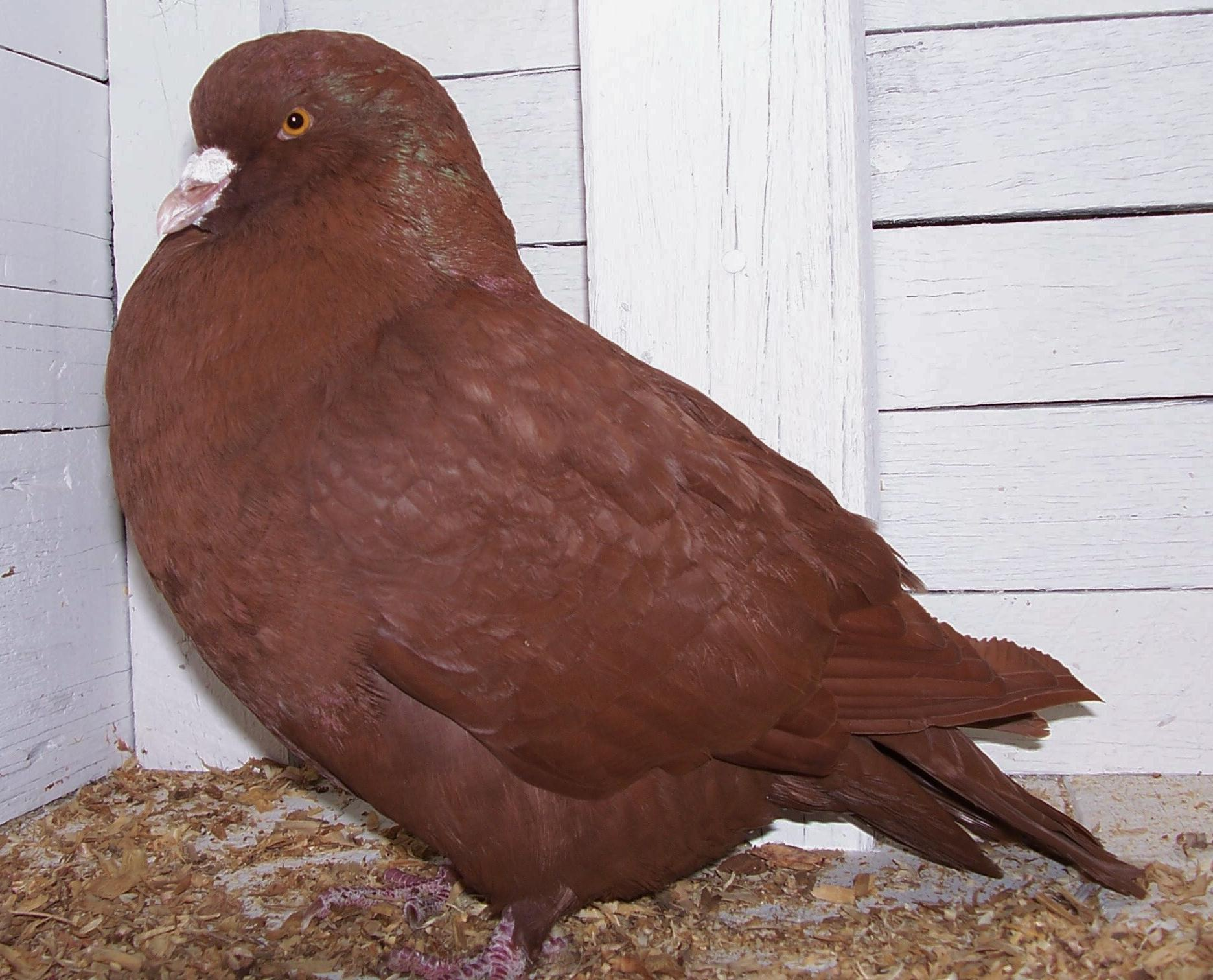
- Recessive red Carneau
- Conservation status: Common
- Country of origin: Belgium

Classification
- Australian Breed Group: Group 8 Utility
- US Breed Group: Form
- EE Breed Group: Utility (Form)

The Carneau (plural Carneaux) is a breed of pigeon developed over many years of selective breeding primarily as a utility pigeon. Carneau, along with other varieties of domesticated pigeons, are all descendants from the rock pigeon (Columba livia). The breed is known for large size and suitability for squab production. White Carneau pigeons are extensively used in experiments on operant conditioning; most of the pigeons used in B. F. Skinner's original work on schedules of reinforcement were White Carneaux.

== Origin ==
The Carneau originated in northern France and southern Belgium. It was once a free-flying breed, living by fielding.

== See also ==
- Pigeon Diet
- Pigeon Housing
- List of pigeon breeds
