= Strasser pigeon =

Breed of pigeon

Strasser
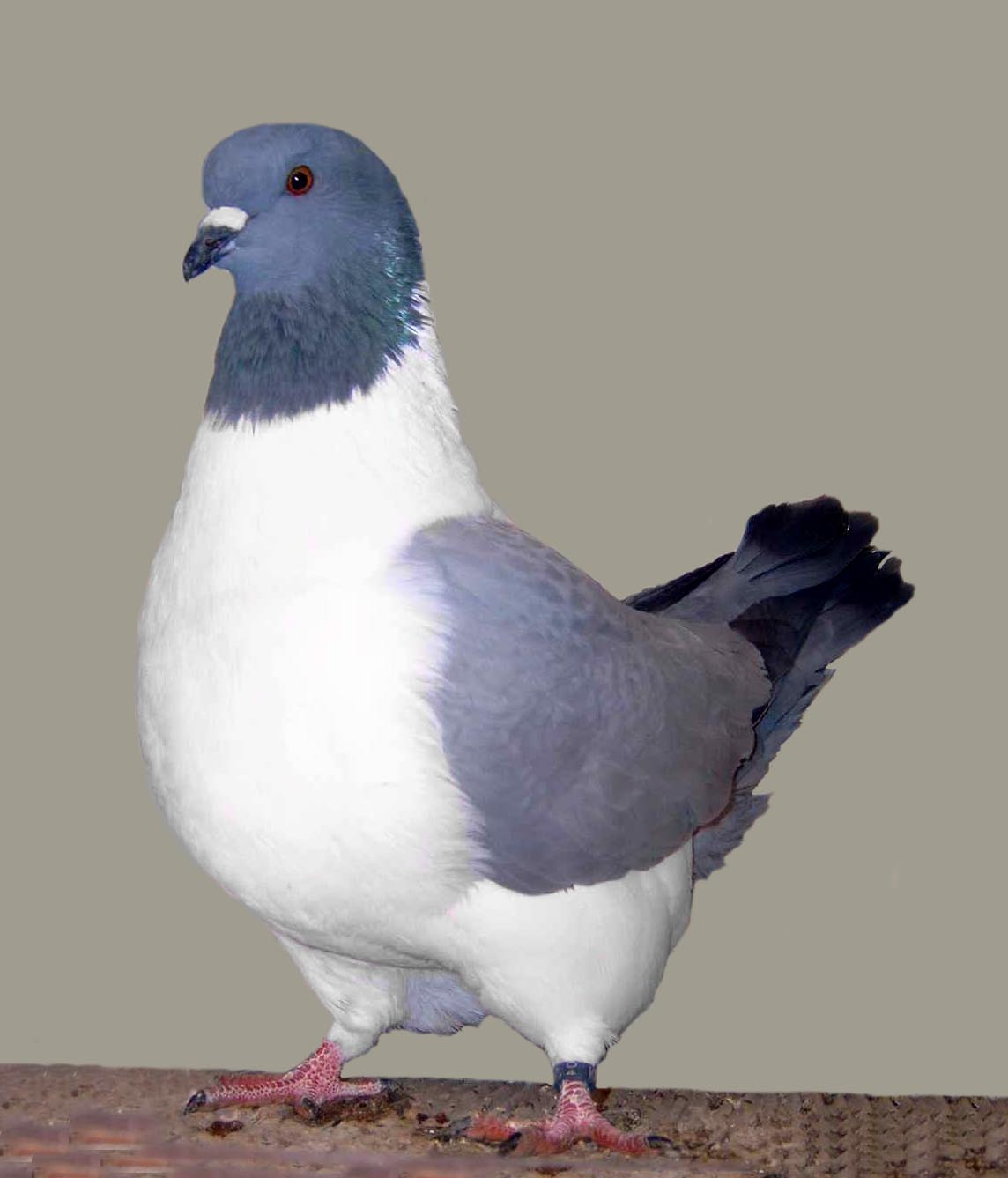
- Blue barless
- Conservation status: Common
- Other names: Morovian Strasser
- Country of origin: Germany
- Distribution: wide
- Standard: yes
- Type: Utility
- Use: Show

Traits
- Weight: Male: 22; Female: 21
- Egg color: white
- Crest type: none
- Feather ornamentation: no feather Ornamentation
- Color: 29 standard colors
- Lifespan: 12 years
- clutch size: 2
- head: round
- marking: Colored head, wings and tail
- eye color: orange-red

Classification
- Australian: Group 8 Utility
- European: Utility
- US: Form

The Strasser is a breed of fancy pigeon developed over many years of selective breeding. Strassers, along with other varieties of domesticated pigeons, are all descendants from the rock pigeon (Columba livia).

Apart from exhibition at pigeon shows, the breed is also used for utility purposes for producing squabs as food.

== Description and standard ==
The German club breed standard describes them as large, massive, compact and low-set. The required minimum size must be maintained. Irrespective of exact weight and size requirements in grams and centimetres, the breed attributes must give the Strasser a harmonious overall appearance. Birds that are too large and lack elegance and aura are not the breeding goal. The females must also have the required body size but must convey a feminine overall impression. The American version of the Strasser has its own standard, which is very similar, but the birds are larger overall and up to 30 ounces for adult males.

The heads of Strasser pigeons are required to be large, well-rounded and broad, with the highest point of the head ideally lying approximately above the eye. Males in particular only look really masculine with a strong head. Females must also have a pronounced head that matches their body, but the overall feminine impression must not be lost as a result. The ideal head for a female therefore looks strong, but still feminine and elegant.

The eye of a Strasser pigeon is required to be red to orange-red. Animals with fiery orange-red eyes are the least problematic in breeding; ruby-red eyes - whilst fully permitted and in no way inferior the aforementioned fiery orange-red eyes for exhibition purposes - can lead to incorrect eye colours in the offspring if both parents have ruby-red eyes. Small black dots in the iris and deformed pupils are faulty, as are drooping eyelids and feathers that stand directly in front of the eyes, making it difficult for the animals to see. The eye rims should be narrow and colour-matched to the individual colours, with the exception of reds and yellows, in which the eye rims have the colour of light flesh. The beak should be strongly developed, not too long, naturally shaped, slightly curved at the tip and close well. A lower beak that is visibly wider than the upper beak must be criticised.

The medium-length neck should be strong and harmonious in the transition from the shoulders to the head. The neck plumage should be firm and smooth. The ideal chest must be wide, rounded, full and deep. This requirement can practically only be met in conjunction with sufficient shoulder width. It is considered a serious fault if Strasser's pigeons have a flat chest or if they lift their chest too high. Viewed from above, a good Strasser should have the shape of a pear. A prerequisite for this is sufficient shoulder width. From the shoulders the body becomes narrower and merges into the broad back and the equally broad tail.

The 10 hand wings should be strong, broad and not too long. The wings should be firm and rest on the tail. The wing shield should be as broad and deep as possible, almost round. The required body depth is only given if this requirement is met. Following the dorsal line, the tail only slightly overhangs the wings. It should not be wider than the back and should never fan out. The tail feathers should look well closed when viewed from above as well as from the side. The requirement for a low stance demands short legs, which should also be robust. A large, robust pigeon should also have a wide stance. A too narrow leg position and a more or less pronounced growth of feathers on the feet is faulty. A stance that is too low is not typical of the breed. If a Strasser stands in posture and the foot ring is just visible, then the correct stance height is given. The colour of the claws is no longer taken into consideration when judging at exhibitions.

The Strasser pigeon should have plumage that lies close to the body, but it should not be too tight, otherwise the body shape may not appear sufficiently rounded. The basic body colour is white. The head and a medium-sized ‘bib’ as well as the wings, back, tail and anal plumage are coloured. Gross marking defects such as coloured patches in the white base colour, strong cuts in the head or back markings, elongated neck patterns (‘braid’), but also a bib that is too large or too small are to be criticised.

As of 2024, Strassers can be shown in 29 different colours at pigeon exhibitions in Germany and most other European countries. Those colours are: Blue barless, blue with black bars, blue check, blue dark check, black, recessive red, recessive yellow, silver (blue dilute) barless, silver with dark bars, silver check, silver dark check, ash red barless, ash red with bars, ash red check, ash red dark check, ash yellow barless, ash yellow with bars, ash yellow check, ash yellow dark check, blue with white bars (Toy Stencil), light-blue with white bars (Dominant Opal), black with white bars, recessive red with white bars, recessive yellow with white bars, blue laced (Toy Stencil), light-blue laced (Dominant Opal), black pencilled, recessive red pencilled and recessive yellow pencilled.

== Gallery ==
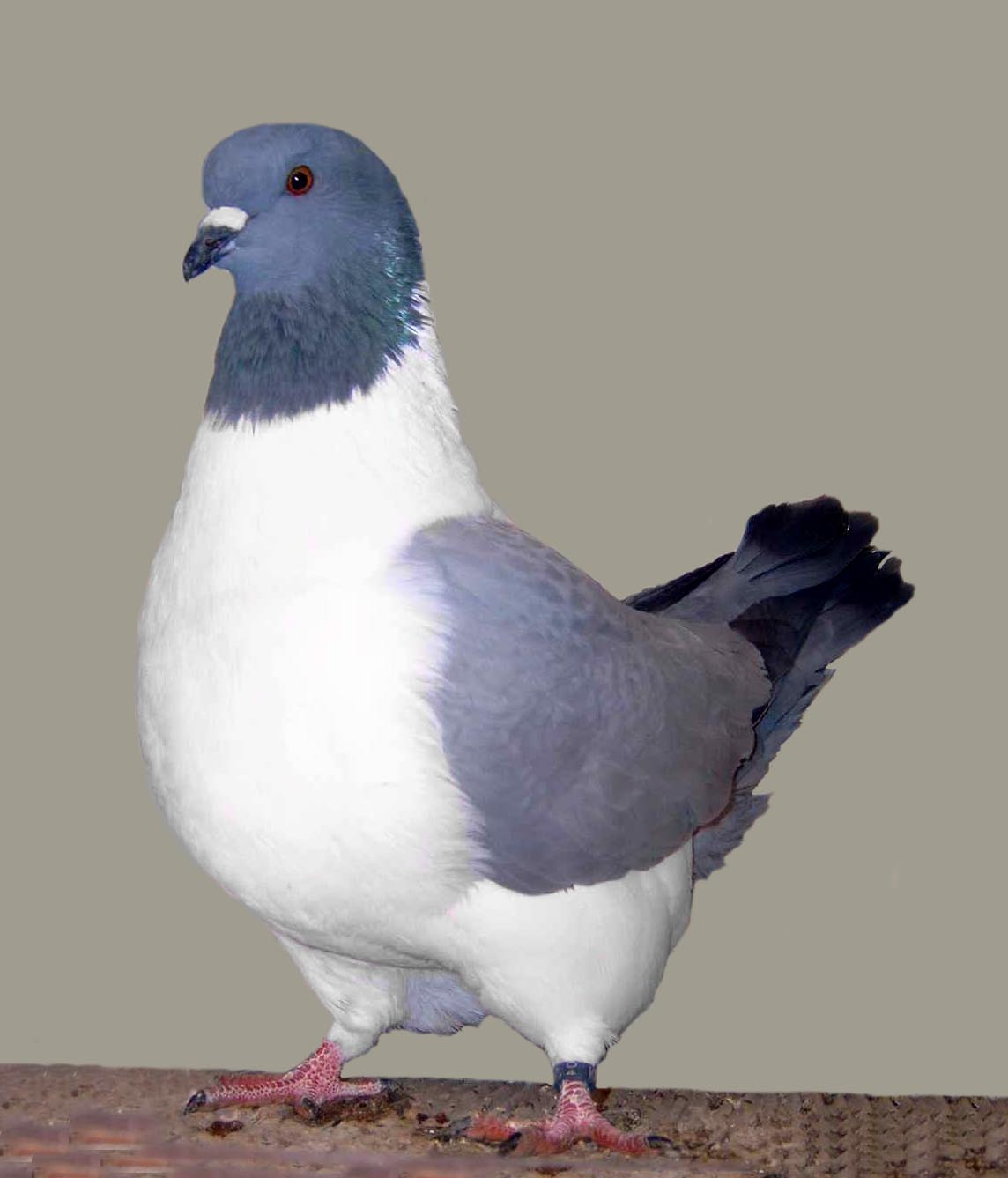
blue barless

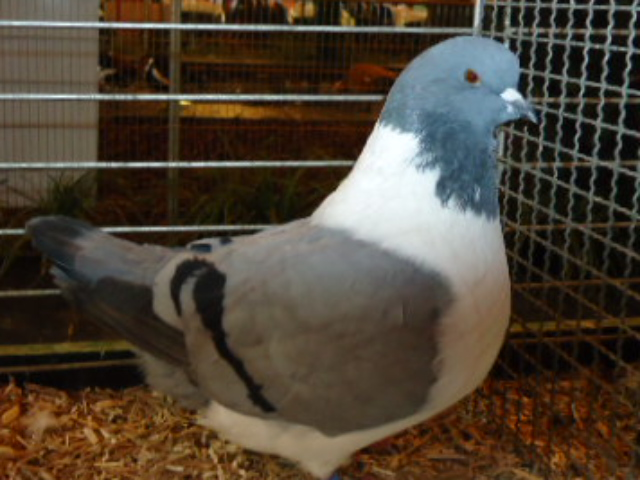
blue bar

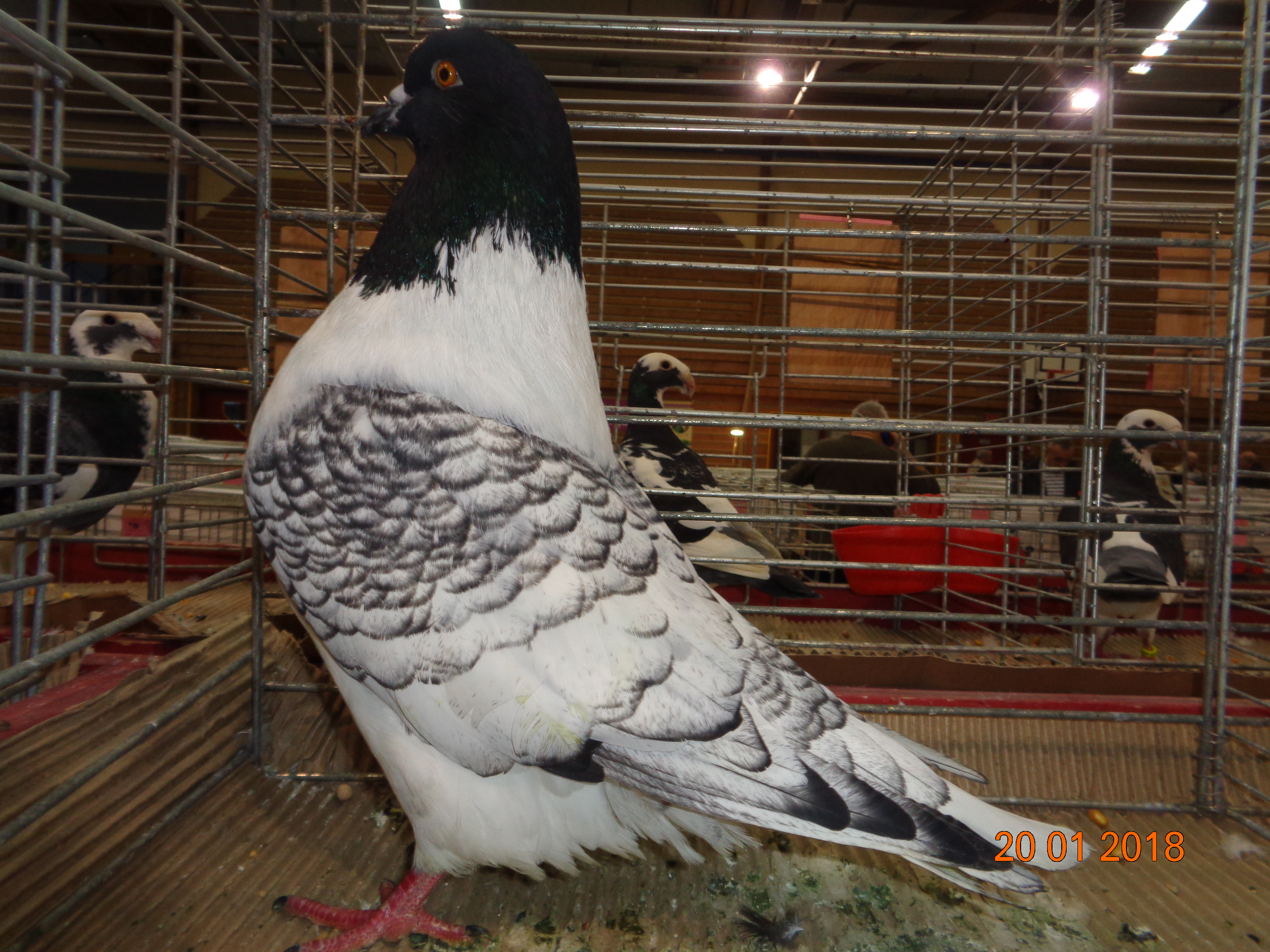
noir liseré blanc

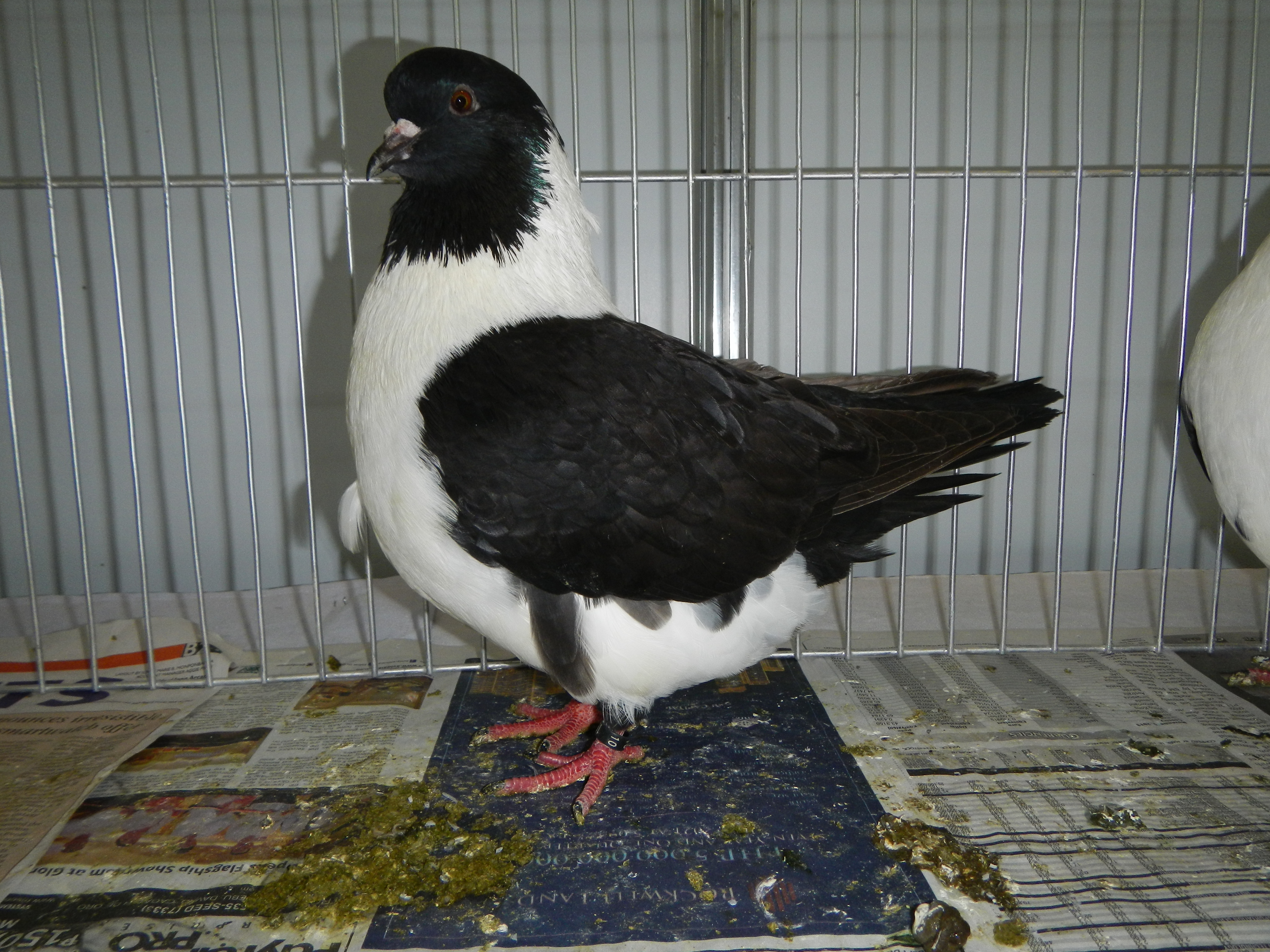
black

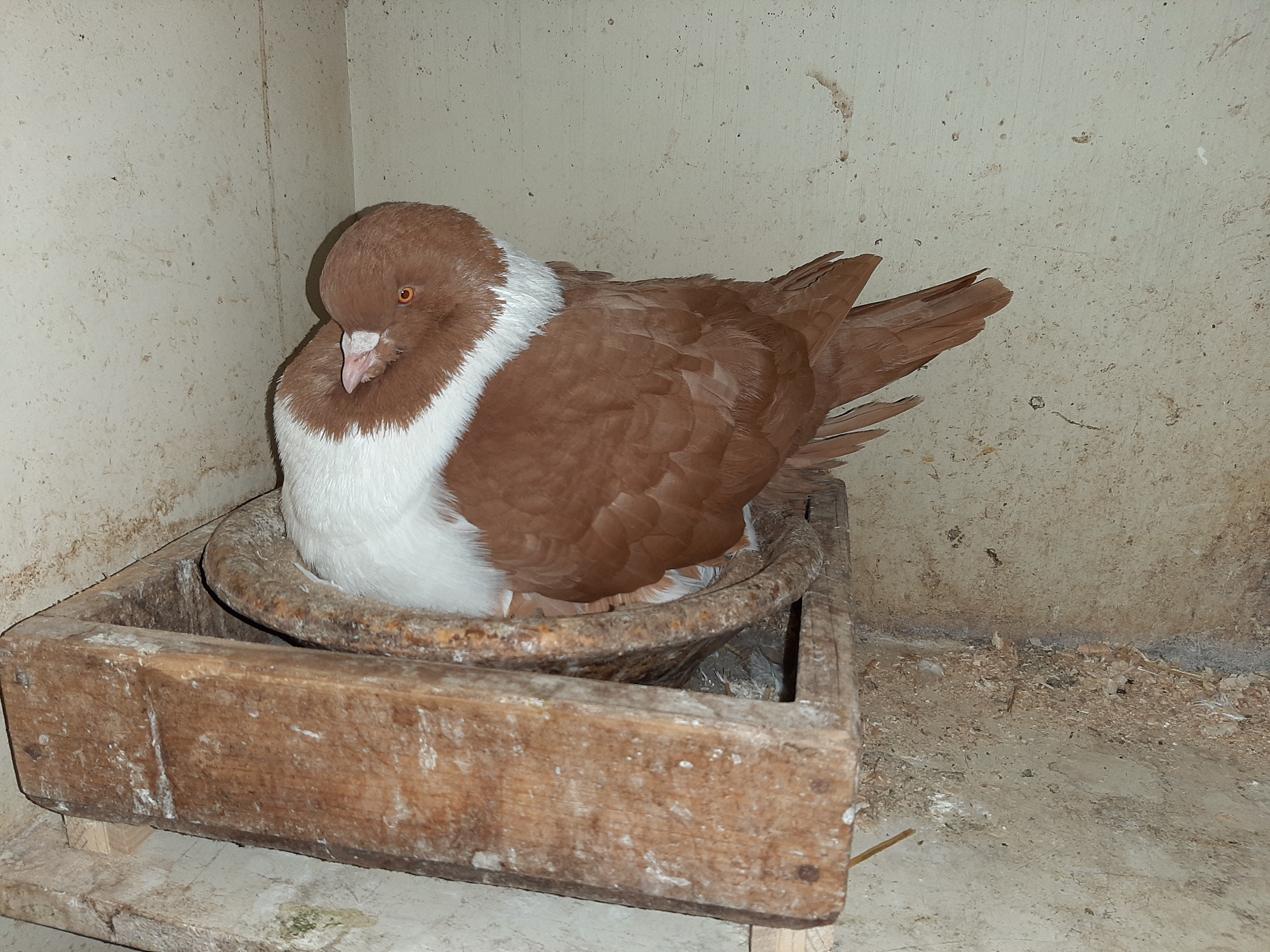
yellow

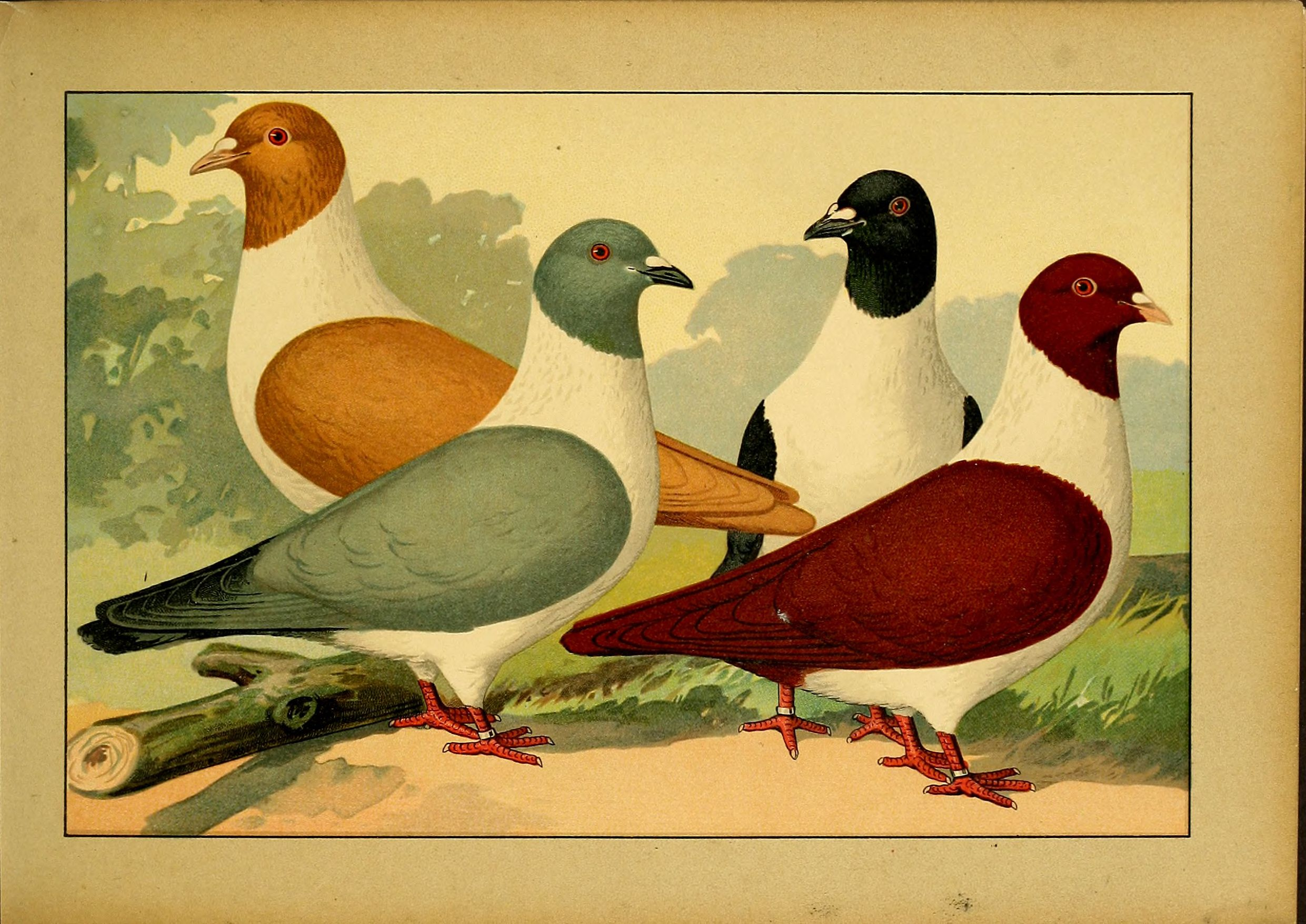
Schachtzabel 1906 Tafel 18

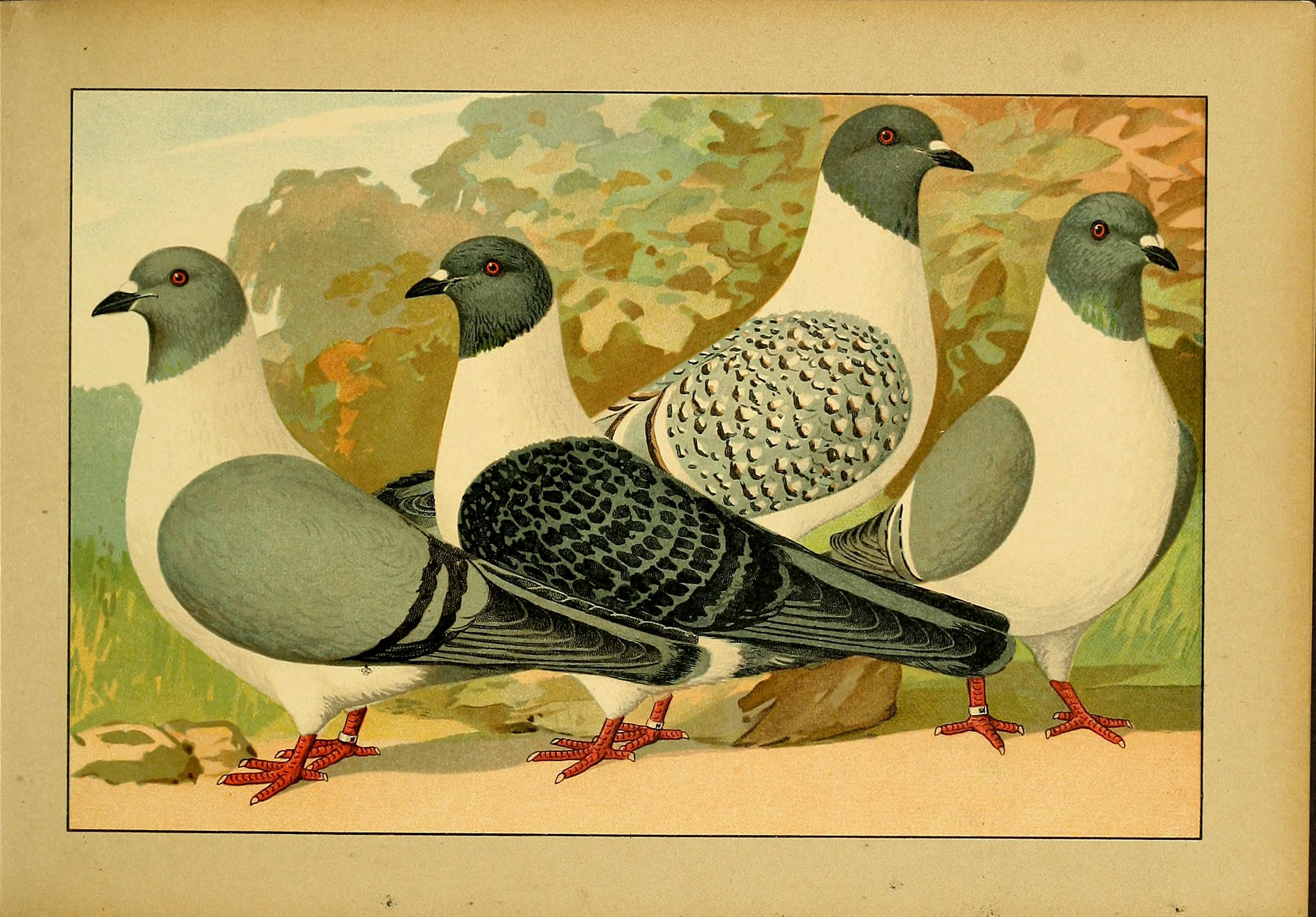
Schachtzabel 1906 Tafel 19

== Clubs and breeding ==
Strassers are bred throughout continental Europe and are especially popular among pigeon fanciers in Germany, France, Austria, Romania and Hungary. Special clubs which represent and look after Strasser breeders exist in those countries. In relatively great numbers, Strassers are also shown at exhibitions in Poland and Denmark. Since Germany is today the centre of Strasser breeding, the main Strasser exhibition (which is always open to foreign breeders) is not only the most important German competition for breeders of the Strasser, with over 1,000 birds on display each year, but also acts as a central meeting place where trends, opinions and stock pigeons are discussed and exchanged across national and linguistic borders.

== See also ==
- Pigeon Diet
- Pigeon Housing
- List of pigeon breeds
- Geflügel-Börse Laced Strasser 1995 #14
- Geflügel-Börse Prachener Kanik 1997 #8
