= Utility pigeons =

Pigeons bred for meat

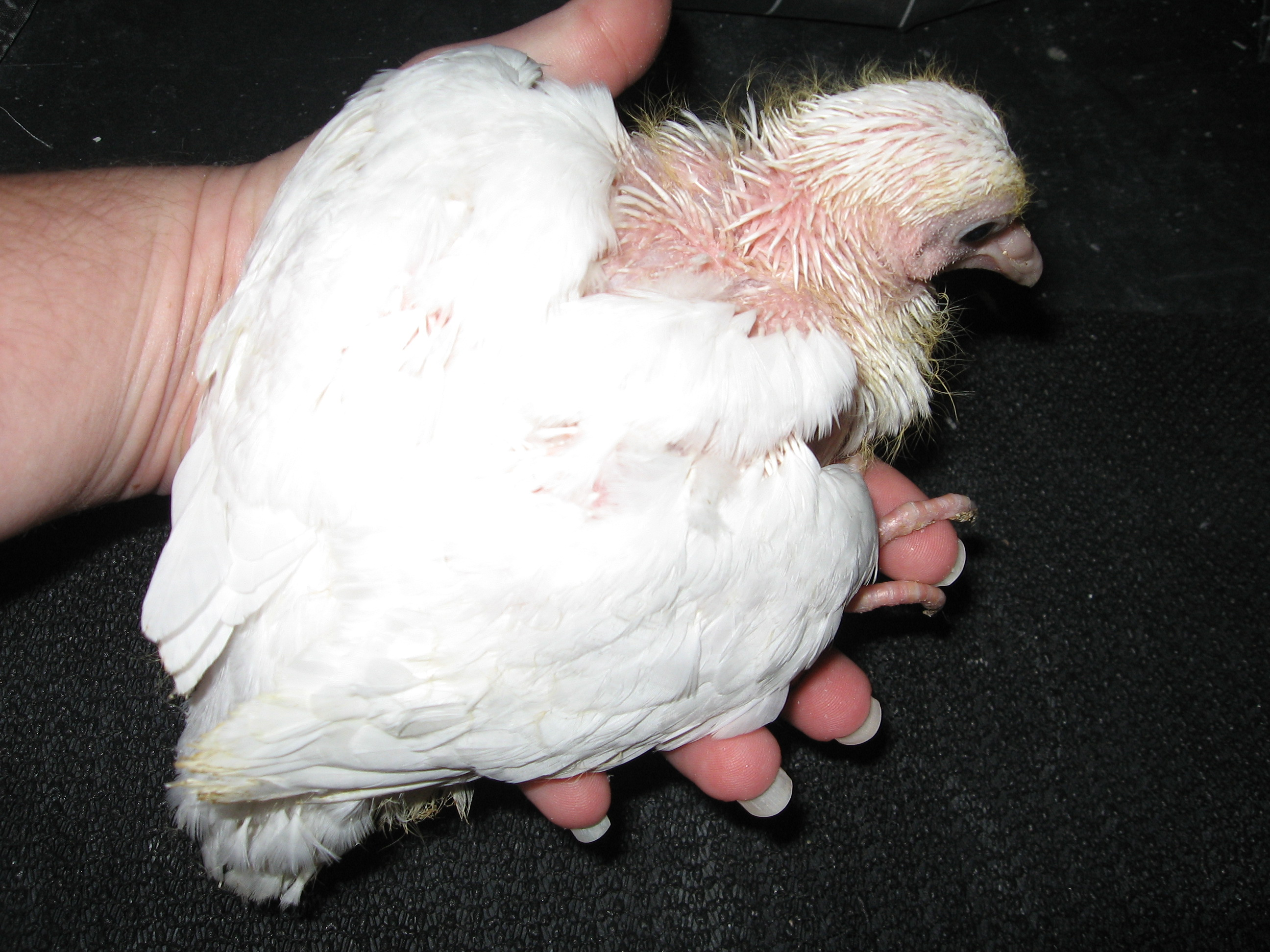
A young utility squab

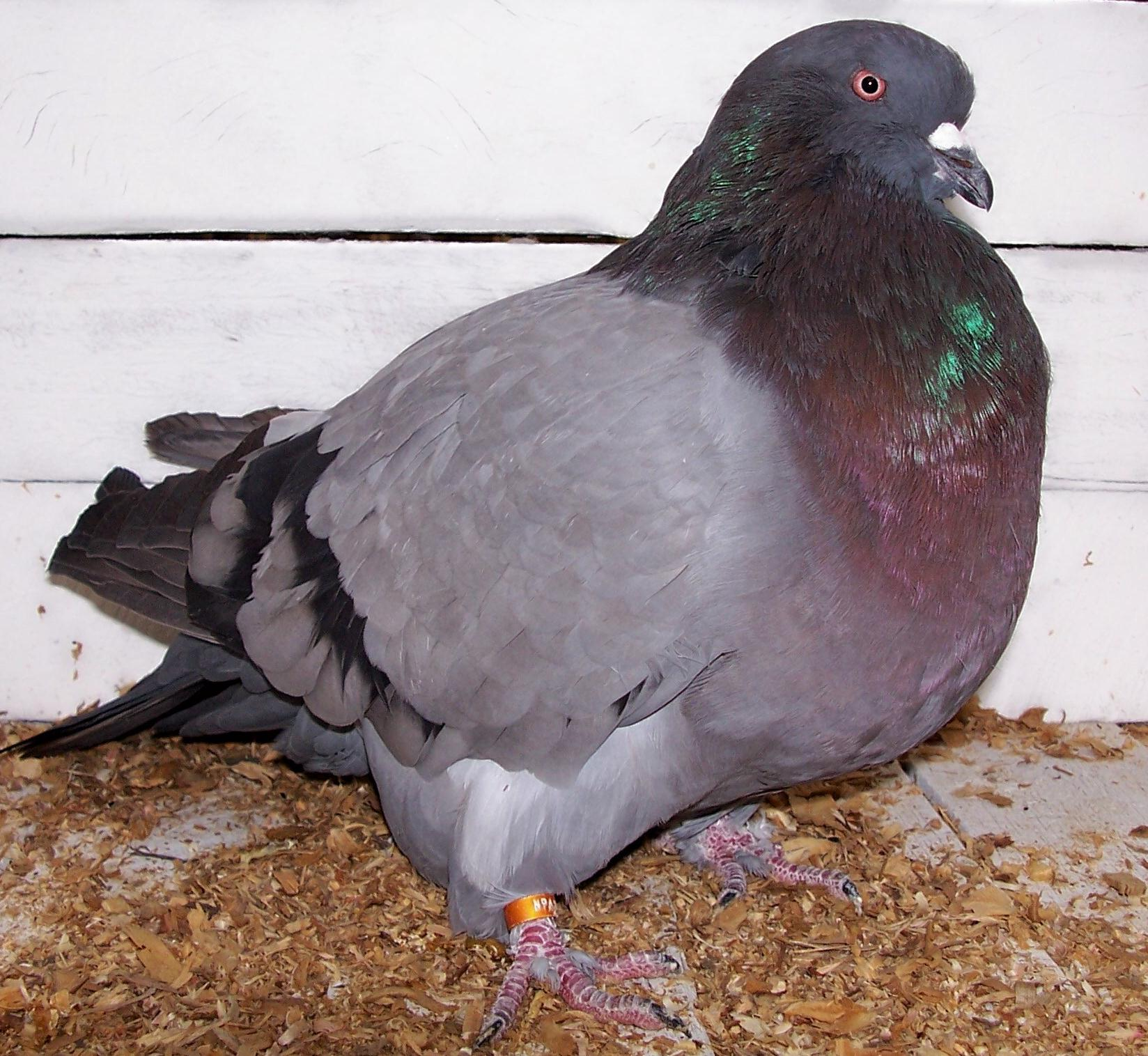
American Giant Runt. This breed is considered to be a utility pigeon.

Utility pigeons are domesticated pigeons bred to be a source of meat called squab. Squabs have been used as a food in many nations for centuries. They were bred to breed and grow quickly. Because they are bred for squab production, conformation to a show standard is usually deemed unimportant.

Utility pigeons are one of three main breed groupings used by pigeon fanciers. The other two are Flying/Sporting and Fancy.

The characteristics of utility pigeons of most importance to the businessperson who is keeping them are rapid growth and high fecundity.

The American King pigeon has been described as the world's first improved utility pigeon breed.

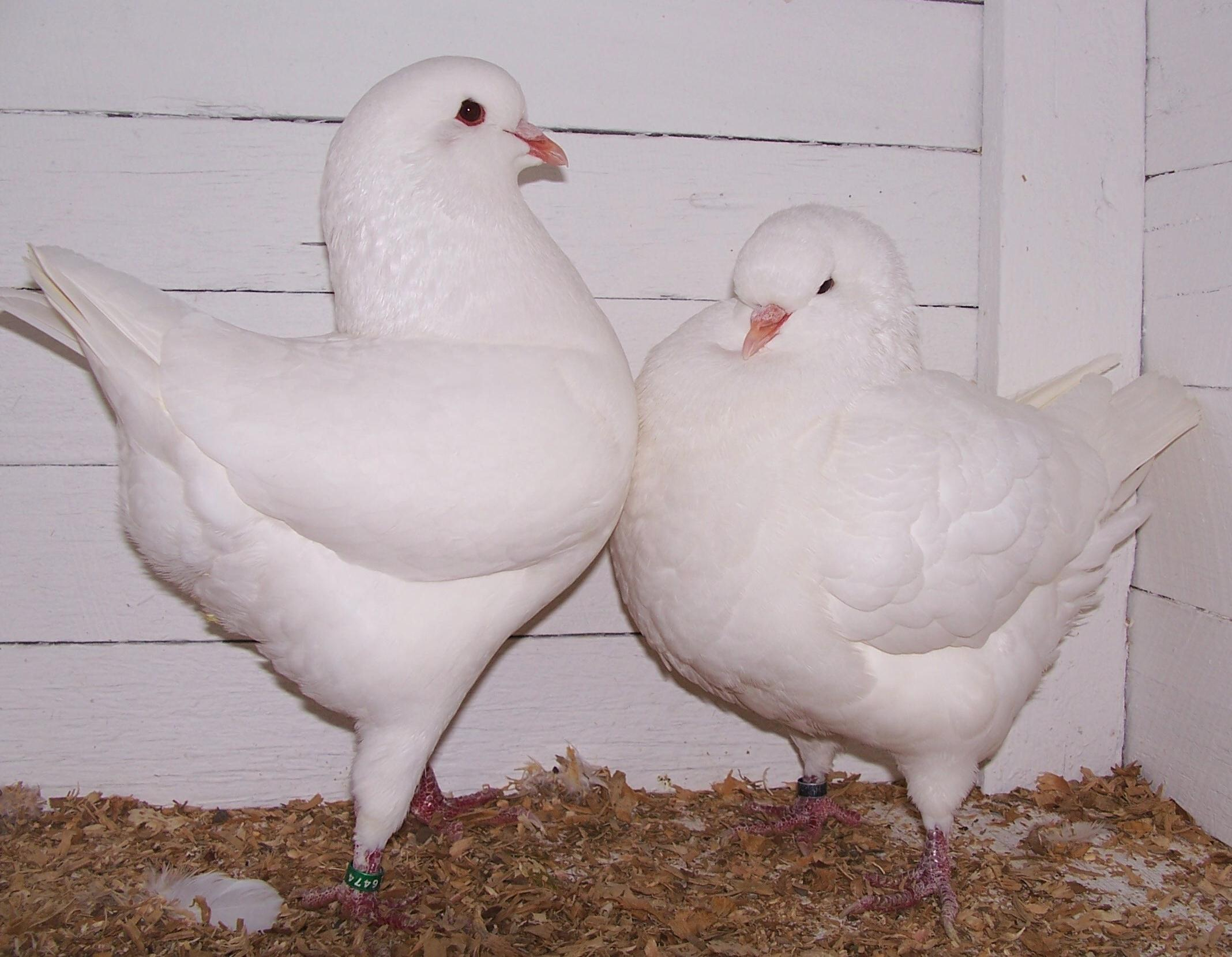
King pigeons, an early breed of utility pigeon.

There are breeds of pigeons which at one time were raised for utility purposes but which are now raised for show purposes. Fanciers usually distinguish between the two sub-breeds by appending the word "show" or "utility" to the name of the breed. For example, there are show King pigeons and Utility Kings and they are two different breeds of pigeon. The show breeds can still be used for squabbing purposes.

== See also ==
- American Giant Runt
- Carneau
- French Mondain
- King pigeon
- Strasser pigeon
- List of pigeon breeds
