= Hungarian Giant Pigeon =

Hungarian Giant House Pigeon
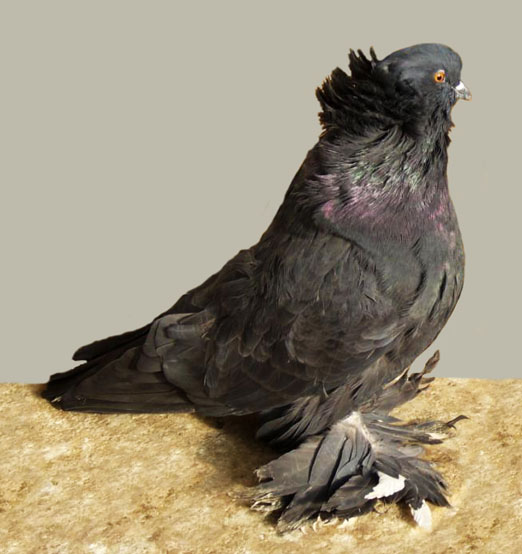
- Hungarian Giant House Pigeon
- Conservation status: Rare
- Nicknames: Queen of pigeons
- Type: Utility
- Use: Show

Traits
- Weight: Male: 2.2 pounds; Female: 1.8 pounds
- Height: Male: 11 inches
- Crest type: cap
- Feather ornamentation: feathered feet
- Color: black, blue, brown
- Lifespan: 12 years
- Length: over 20 inches

Classification
- Australian: Not listed
- European: Utility
- US: Form

The Hungarian Giant Pigeon is one of the largest oldest pigeon breeds in Hungary. They were given the nickname "Queen of Pigeons".

It has been a common breed in Nagyalföld, for hundreds of years. Their ancestors most likely come from Turkey, and were nationalized during the Era of Turkish occupation of Lower Hungary (Hódoltság Kora).

From its beak to its tail, the Hungarian Giant Pigeon can measure up to 45–50 cm and a height of 25–28 cm. It has stronger bones compared to common pigeons. The female's weight is at minimum 800 grams and 900-1000 g. for males. Because of their large size they were often used as squabbing pigeons in the U.S. during the 1920s Originally white, they now exist in black, grey and brown. Currently there are about 1500 living in Hungary.

== Gallery ==
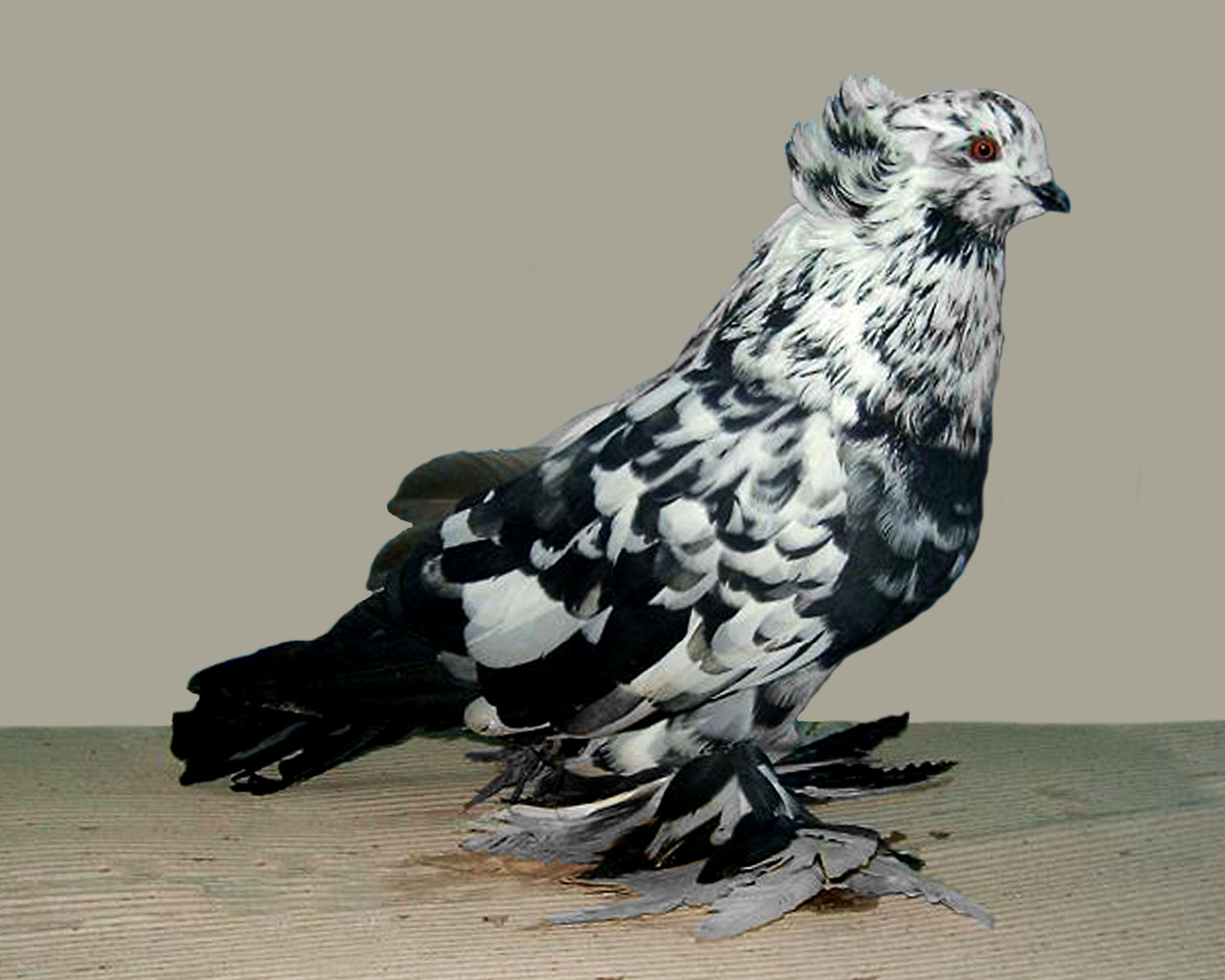
Splash

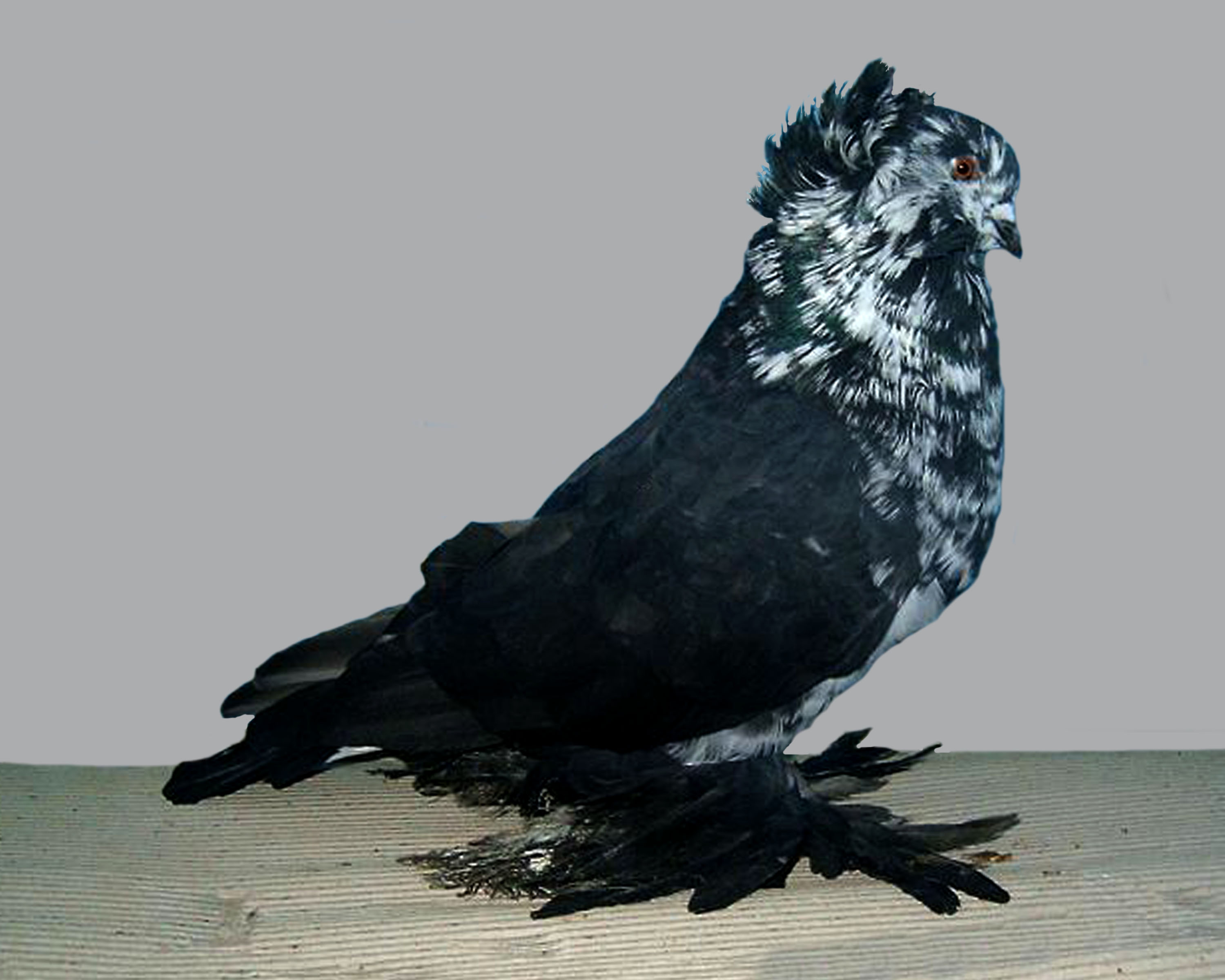
White tiger

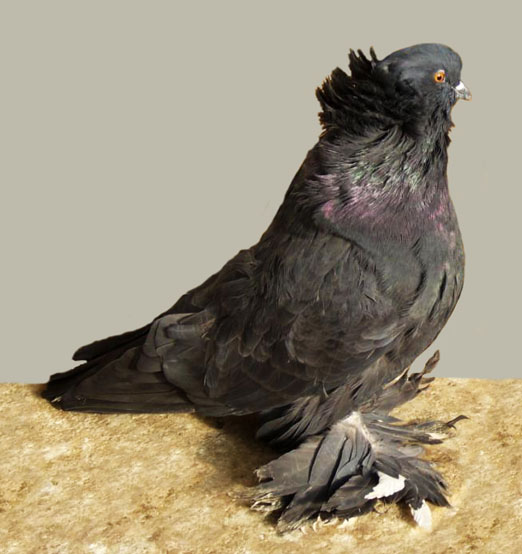
Dun

== See also ==
- Pigeon Diet
- Pigeon Housing
- King pigeon
- Domestic pigeon
- List of pigeon breeds
- Media related to Hungarian Giant Pigeon at Wikimedia Commons
