= Flying/Sporting pigeons =

Group of pigeon breeds

Flying/Sporting is the name of one of three main groupings of breeds of domesticated pigeons used by pigeon fanciers in the United States. The other two are Fancy and Utility.

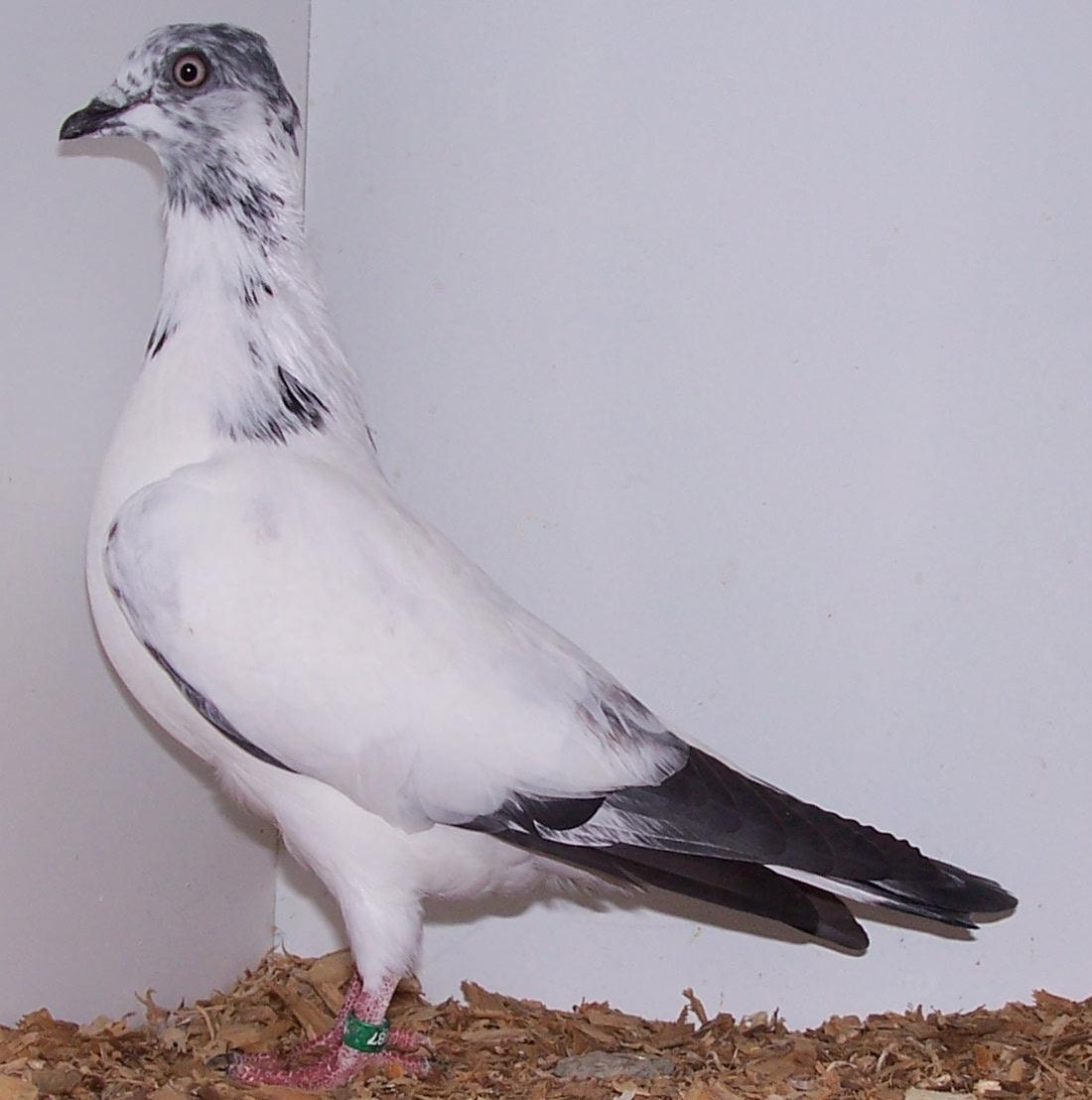
Vienna Highflier

These groupings, which can be somewhat arbitrary, are useful mainly in the context of a pigeon show. All the pigeons of all the breeds in the flying/sporting group compete for the best flying/sporting of show which then customarily competes against the best fancy and best utility to pick an overall show champion. The breeds in this particular group are in the main regarded as dual purpose in that they can be exhibited in shows but also retain their acrobatic or flying ability. Breeds such as rollers, tipplers, highfliers and show type racing homers are covered under this grouping.

Wendell M. Levi in his book The Pigeon mentions that some American authors prior to himself broke up this grouping into two separate groups: "high-flying" and "racing".

== See also ==
- List of pigeon breeds
