= Squab =

Food; young domestic pigeon, typically under four weeks old

Squab is the meat of an immature domestic pigeon, typically under four weeks old. Some authors describe it as tasting like dark chicken.

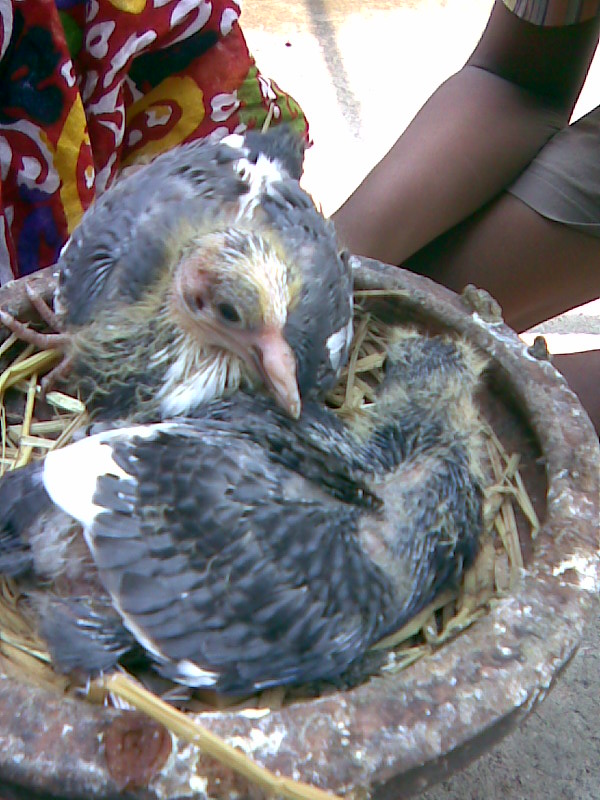
Pigeon chicks under four weeks old.

The word "squab" probably comes from Scandinavia; the Swedish word skvabb means "loose, fat flesh". The term formerly applied to all dove and pigeon species (such as the wood pigeon, the mourning dove, the extinct-in-the-wild socorro dove, and the now extinct passenger pigeon,) and their meat. More recently, squab meat comes almost entirely from domesticated pigeons. The meat of dove and pigeon gamebirds hunted primarily for sport is rarely called "squab".

The practice of domesticating pigeons as livestock may have originated in North Africa; historically, many societies have consumed squabs or pigeons, including ancient Egypt (still common in modern Egypt), Rome, China, India (Northeast), and medieval Europe. It is a familiar meat in Jewish, Arab, and French cuisines. According to the Tanakh, doves are kosher, and they are the only birds that may be used for a korban. (Other kosher birds may be eaten, but not brought as a korban.) Pigeon is also used in Asian cuisines such as Chinese, Assamese, and Indonesian cuisines. Although squab has been consumed throughout much of recorded history, it is generally regarded as exotic, not as a contemporary staple food; there are more records of its preparation for the wealthy than for the poor.

The modern squab industry uses utility pigeons. Squab farmers raise the young until they are roughly a month old (when they reach adult size but have not yet flown) before slaughter.

== History ==
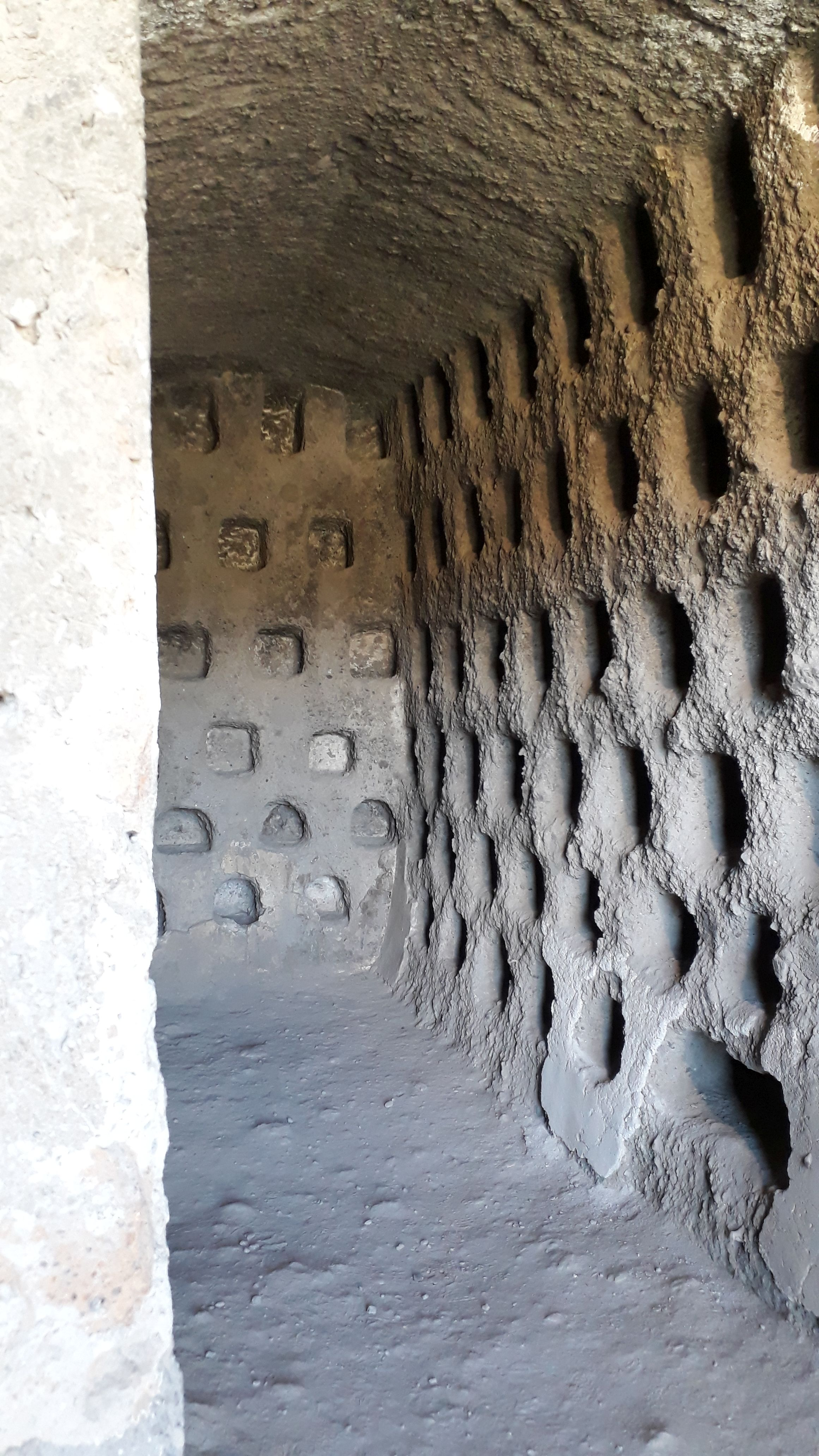
A dovecote in the caves of Orvieto, Italy, where the locals have raised squab for food since the time of the Etruscans in the Iron Age

The practice of domesticating pigeon as livestock may have come from the North Africa; historically, squabs or pigeons have been consumed in many civilizations, including ancient Egypt, ancient Rome, and Medieval Europe. Doves are considered kosher, though are not as common in the Jewish diet as they were in ancient times. Texts about methods of raising pigeons for their meat date as far back as AD 60 in Spain. Such birds were hunted for their meat because it was a cheap and readily available source of protein.

In the Tierra de Campos, a resource-poor region of north-western Spain, squab meat was an important supplement to grain crops from at least Roman times. Caelius Aurelianus, an Ancient Roman physician, regarded the meat as a cure for headaches, but by the 16th century, squab was believed to cause headaches.

A stone inscription in Bwahan village of Indonesian island Bali dated to 994 AD lists turtle doves (manuk kitiran), doves (putir) and wild pigeons (wuruwuru) as part of the trade inventory.

From the Middle Ages, a dovecote (French pigeonnier) was a common outbuilding on an estate that aimed to be self-sufficient. The dovecote was considered a "living pantry", a source of meat for unexpected guests, and was important as a supplementary source of income from the sale of surplus birds. Dovecotes were introduced to South America and Africa by Mediterranean colonists. In medieval England, squab meat was highly valued, although its availability depended on the season.

In England, pigeon meat was eaten when other food was rationed during World War II and remains associated with wartime shortages and poverty. This was parodied in an episode of the sitcom Dad's Army, "Getting the Bird". Nevertheless, many people continue to eat it, especially the older generation.

== Husbandry ==
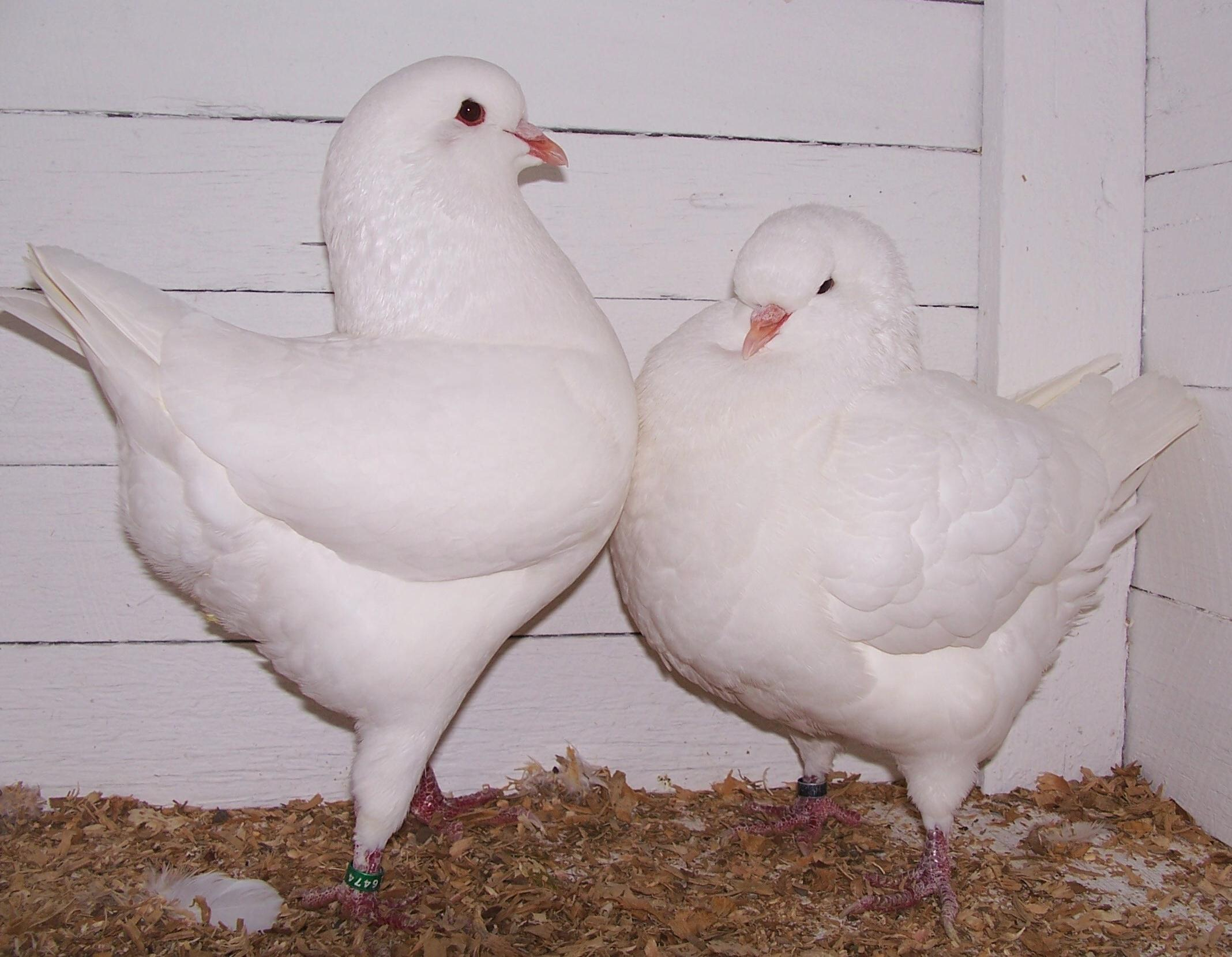
A pair of king pigeons. Large breast muscles are common in utility pigeons.

Squab have been commercially raised in North America since the early 1900s. As of 1986, annual production in the United States and Canada was one and a half million squabs per year.

Pigeons, unlike other poultry, form pair bonds to breed, and squabs must be brooded and fed by both parents until they are four weeks old; a pair of pigeons may produce 15 squabs per year. Ten pairs can produce eight squabs each month without being fed by their keepers. Pigeons which are accustomed to their dovecote may forage and return there to rest and breed. Industrially raised pigeons have young which weigh 1.3 lb (0.59 kg) when of age, as opposed to traditionally raised pigeons, which weigh 0.5 pounds (0.23 kg).

Utility pigeons have been artificially selected for weight gain, quick growth, health when kept in large numbers, and health of their infants. For a greater yield, commercially raised squab may be produced in a two-nest system, where the mother lays two new eggs in a second nest while her offspring are still growing in the first nest, fed crop milk by both parents. Establishing two breeding lines has been suggested as another strategy for greater yield, where one breeding line is selected for prolificacy and the other for "parental performance", which, according to Aggrey and Cheng, is "vital" for squab growth after the age of two weeks.

Meleg estimates that 15–20% of eggs fail to hatch in well-maintained pigeon lofts. Egg size is important for the squab's initial size and for mortality at hatching, but becomes less important as the squab ages. Aggrey and Cheng say that the hatched weight of squabs is not a good indicator of their weight at four weeks old.

Squabs reach adult size, but are not yet ready to fly (making them easier to catch) after roughly a month; at this point, they are slaughtered.

== In cuisine ==
Squab (pigeon), meat only, raw
Nutritional value per 100 g (3.5 oz)
- Energy: 594 kJ (142 kcal)
- Carbohydrates: 0.00
- Dietary fiber: 0.0
- Fat: 7.50
- Saturated: 1.96
- Monounsaturated: 2.66
- Polyunsaturated: 1.60
- Protein: 17.50
Vitamins and minerals
Vitamins	Quantity %DV^{†}
Vitamin A equiv.	3% 28 μg
Vitamin A	94 IU
Thiamine (B1)	24% 0.283 mg
Riboflavin (B2)	22% 0.285 mg
Pantothenic acid (B5)	16% 0.787 mg
Vitamin B6	31% 0.53 mg
Folate (B9)	2% 7 μg
Vitamin B12	20% 0.47 μg
Vitamin C	8% 7.2 mg
Minerals	Quantity %DV^{†}
Calcium	1% 13 mg
Iron	25% 4.51 mg
Magnesium	6% 25 mg
Manganese	1% 0.019 mg
Phosphorus	25% 307 mg
Potassium	8% 237 mg
Sodium	2% 51 mg
Zinc	25% 2.7 mg
- Other constituents: Quantity
- Water: 72.80
- There is some variation in nutritional content depending on the breed of utility pigeon used for squabbing.

Usually considered a delicacy, squab is tender, moist and richer in taste than many commonly consumed poultry meats, but there is relatively little meat per bird, the meat being concentrated in the breast. Squab is dark meat, and the skin is fatty, like that of duck. The meat is very lean, easily digestible, and "rich in proteins, minerals, and vitamins". It has been described as having a "silky" texture, as it is very tender and fine-grained. It has a milder taste than other game, and has been described as having a mild berry flavor. Squab's flavor lends itself to complex red or white wines. The 1997 edition of the Joy of Cooking cautions that if squab is cooked beyond medium-rare, its flavor becomes 'distinctly "livery"'.

In the 14th century humorism book Health Regime, squab was regarded as a "hot and moist" food, whereas the meat of older pigeons was regarded as hot, dry, and "barely edible". The Roman cookbook Apicius recommended sauces with a combined sweet and sour flavor to accompany roasted or braised squab. In 1607, a recipe book from a monastery in Salamanca, Spain, suggested cooking squab with pork fat or bitter limes. There is less information about traditional recipes incorporating squab or pigeon used by commoners, but there is evidence they were "handed down from generation to generation".

In the 15th century, the Italian friar Luca Pacioli wrote a book of "culinary secrets" which included "How to Kill a Squab by Hitting with a Feather on the Head". Indeed, squab would serve as a culinary staple in Italy, including in Umbrian and Tuscan cuisine since before the Medieval era. In 18th century France, pigeons à la crapaudine ("toad-like squab") was a popular "dish of skill" for both rich and poor, in which the squab was arranged so that it looked like a frog, with the breast forming the frog's "face". Religious dietary laws once prohibited meat on fast days, but allowed frog's meat, as it was a water dweller. Pigeons à la crapaudine played with that convention, and is still part of French traditional cuisine.

A 19th-century recipe from California for Pastales de pollos y pichones (Chicken and squab pastry) was as a savory pie with alternating layers of chicken and squab with a picadillo of minced veal, bacon, ham fried in lard with onion, mushrooms, apples, artichokes, tomatoes, and a seasonings layer.

Commercially raised birds "take only half as long to cook" as traditionally raised birds, and are suitable for roasting, grilling, or searing, whereas the traditionally raised birds are better suited to casseroles and slow-cooked stews. The meat from older and wild pigeons is much tougher than squab, and requires a long period of stewing or roasting to tenderize. The consumption of squab probably stems from both the relative ease of catching birds which have not yet fledged, and that unfledged birds have more tender meat. Once a squab has fledged, its weight decreases significantly.

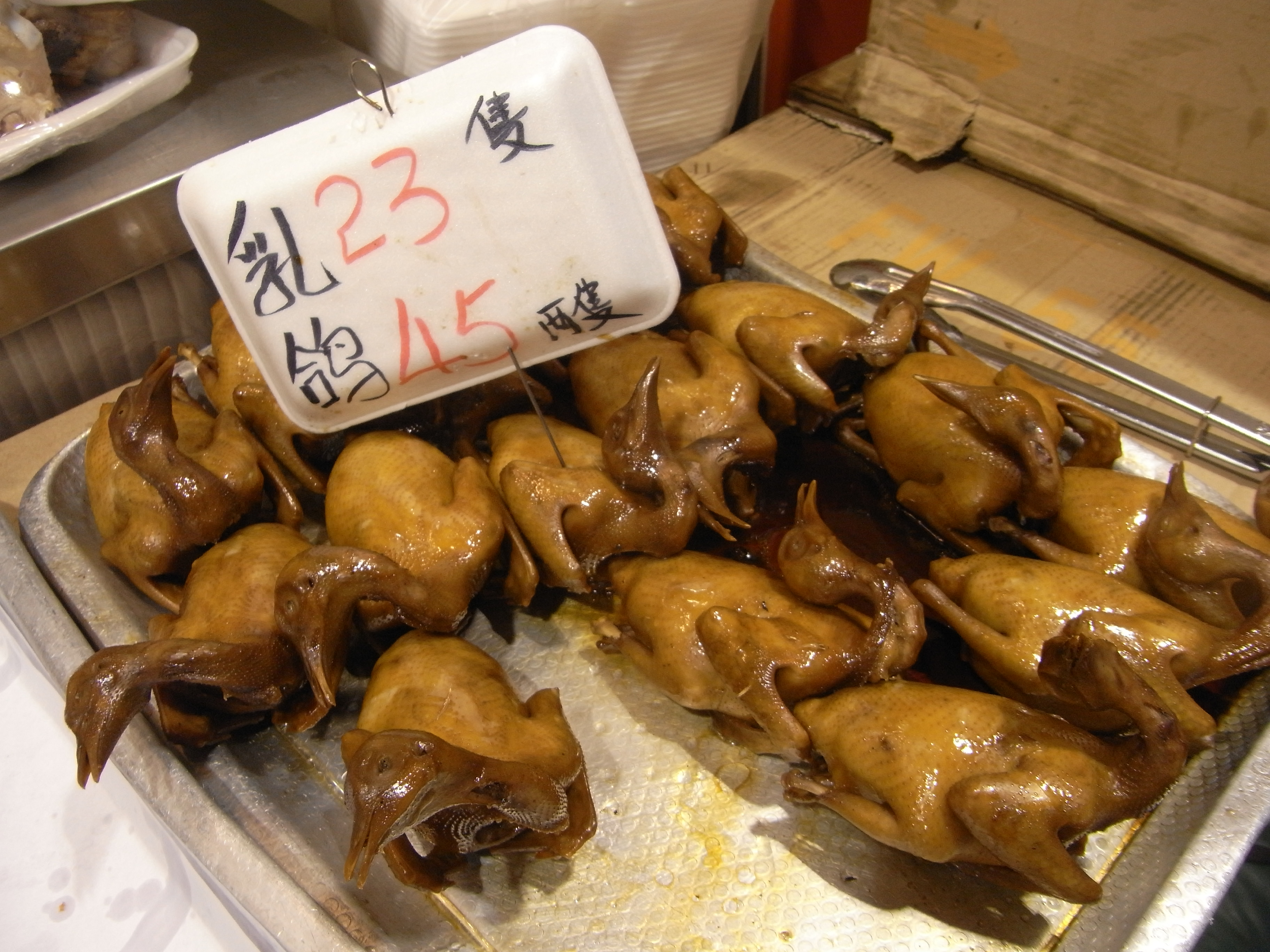
Dressed squab displayed for sale in Hong Kong

Today, squab is part of the cuisine of many countries, including China, France, Egypt, the United States, Italy, Northern Africa, and several Asian countries. Typical dishes include breast of squab (sometimes as the French salmis), Egyptian Mahshi (stuffed with rice or Freekeh and herbs and usually accompanied by mombar), Assamese pigeon curry and the Moroccan pastilla. In Spain and France, squab is also preserved as a confit. Demand for squab is increasing in Nigeria, despite being more expensive than beef, pork or chicken, as pigeons can quickly be raised to table weight and are easy to keep, providing diseases are controlled, as young pigeons are especially susceptible to disease.

In the United States, squab is "increasingly a specialty item", as the larger and cheaper chicken has mostly displaced it. In 1942, MFK Fisher quipped in How to Cook a Wolf, "It is not easy to find pigeons, these days. Most of the ones you know about in the city are working for the government." However, squab produced from specially raised utility pigeons continues to grace the menus of American haute cuisine restaurants such as Le Cirque and the French Laundry, and has enjoyed endorsements from some celebrity chefs. Accordingly, squab is often sold for much higher prices than other poultry, sometimes as high as USD8 per pound.

In Indian cuisine, squab features prominently in the Northeast, such as in the Assamese cuisine. Pigeon is usually cooked as curry and is sometimes cooked with banana blossom. It is popular among both the tribal and non-tribal populations. Pigeon meat is associated with strength, and the pre-colonial Kamarupa Yatra also recommends it for health. Pigeon is sacrificed in some Hindu temples, especially in the Shakta tradition, such as in the Kamakhya temple in India, after which it can be eaten. A similar practice is followed in Nepal too. Pigeon curry is often reserved for special occasions.

In Chinese cuisine, squab is a part of celebratory banquets for holidays such as Chinese New Year, usually served deep-fried. Cantonese-style pigeon is typically braised in soy sauce, rice wine and star anise then roasted with crispy skin and tender meat. Squabs are sold live in Chinese marketplaces to assure freshness, but they can also be dressed in two styles. "Chinese-style" (Buddhist slaughter) birds retain their head and feet, whereas "New York-dressed" (Confucian slaughter) birds retain their entrails, head and feet. The greatest volume of US squab is currently sold within Chinatowns.

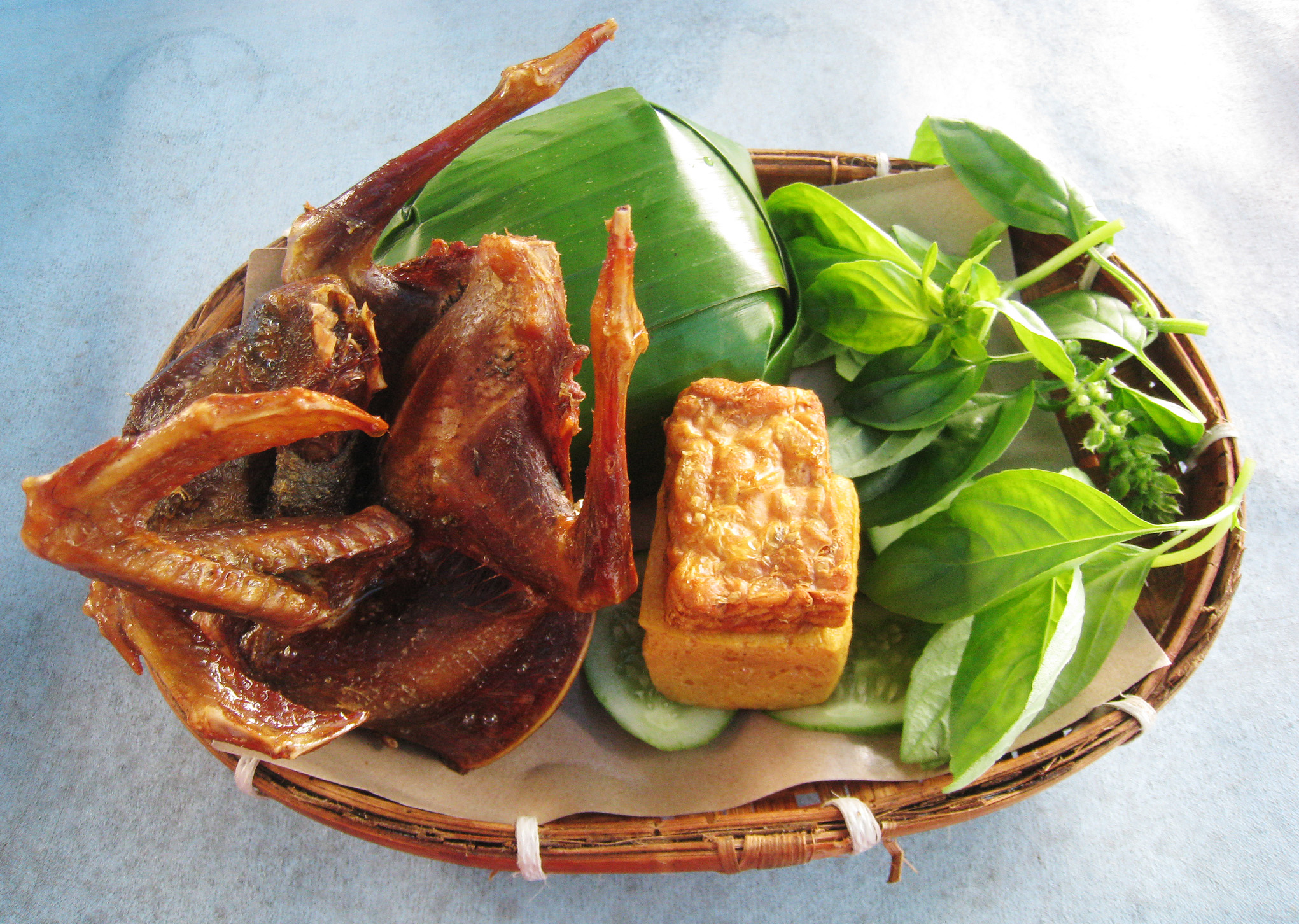
Fried pigeon with nasi timbel (banana leaf wrapped rice), tempeh, tofu, and vegetables, Sundanese cuisine, Indonesia

In Indonesian cuisine, especially Sundanese and Javanese, squab is usually seasoned, spiced with coriander, turmeric, garlic and deep fried in a lot of palm oil. It is served with sambal (chili sauce), tempeh, tofu, vegetables, and nasi timbel (rice wrapped in banana leaf).

Despite the relative ease of raising pigeons, squab is "not usually considered" in terms of its potential for food security. In parts of the world, squab meat is thought of as distasteful by some consumers because they view feral pigeons as unsanitary urban pests. However, squab meat is regarded as safer than some other poultry products as it harbors fewer pathogens, and may be served between medium and well done.

== Wild birds ==
Several species of wild pigeons and doves are used as food; however, all types are edible.

In Europe, the wood pigeon is commonly shot as a game bird.

The extinction of the passenger pigeon in North America was at least partly due to shooting for use as food. Mrs Beeton's Book of Household Management contains recipes for roast pigeon and pigeon pie, a popular, inexpensive food in Victorian industrial Britain.

== See also ==
- Pigeon pie
