= British Homing World Show of the Year =

Pigeon show in Blackpool, England

The British Homing World Show of the Year is an annual two-day gathering of pigeon fanciers held in Blackpool, England, each January. It has been described as "the Crufts of the pigeon world". The event, which is organised by the Royal Pigeon Racing Association, was first held in 1972 in Doncaster. It is now held at the Winter Gardens, Blackpool, where it has been based since 1977.

The show features around 1,000 show pigeons and 2,000 racing pigeons. Fanciers compete for the award of "Best in Class" in 32 different categories, one of which wins the prize of "Supreme Champion of Great Britain". Auctions are held at the event as well; pigeons have sold for up to £10,000 at the event. Suppliers for various pigeon-related products exhibit at the event.

Currently, approximately 25,000 people visit the show each year. The event has a positive effect on the local tourist industry and some hotels, normally closed in winter, open especially for the show. The estimated income from the event is £11 million. Most of the visitors come from the UK and Ireland, but the event also attracts an international audience from Europe and parts of Asia. The show's profits are split between different charities, including British Pigeon Fanciers Medical Research, which offers advice about bird fancier's lung. Since the first Show of the Year, the event has raised over £2.5 million for charity.

In 2023, due to the venue residing in an avian flu surveillance zone, the event had to be held without any birds present.
