= Kyiv Tumbler =

Breed of pigeon

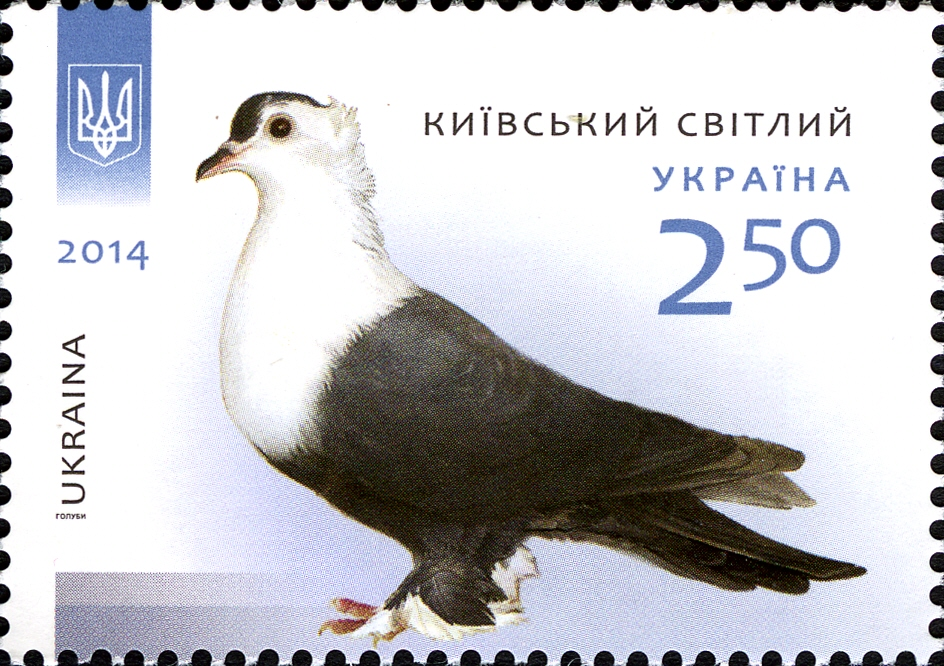
Kyiv Tumbler

The Kyiv Tumbler (Ukrainian: Київський світлий, Kyivskyi svitlyi) is a breed of fancy pigeon.

== Yellow Kyiv Tumbler ==
Origin: Kyiv, capital city of Ukraine.

Breeders of this breed can be found in Ukraine, Russia, Slovakia and most recently, Portugal. There are 1 or 2 breeders in France, but they have the show type of this breed and not the flying type (the original), the one that should tumble.

== Black Kyiv Tumbler ==
Description: A flying breed that flies at a medium height and it should make 'tumbles'. It is long-faced, with a long beak. It is a slender, gentle pigeon. Size: Small, a little smaller than a normal homing pigeon (racing pigeon); weight from 210 to 250 grams.

Ornaments: Have a peak-crested and small-muffed legs. Its wings are carried upon the tail, which has a minimum of 12 rectrices and an oil duct.

== Red Kyiv Tumbler ==
Colors: The feathers of the head, breast, neck and feet are white; Including a frontal spot on the forehead, which should be of the same color as the rest of the body. Its eye is bull, with flesh-colored eye cere.

They are found in colors of Red, Yellow, Black, Blue Bar and other colors but the pigeon must always have the same color markings on the body.

== See also ==
- List of pigeon breeds
