= American Pigeon Museum & Library =

Museum in Oklahoma City

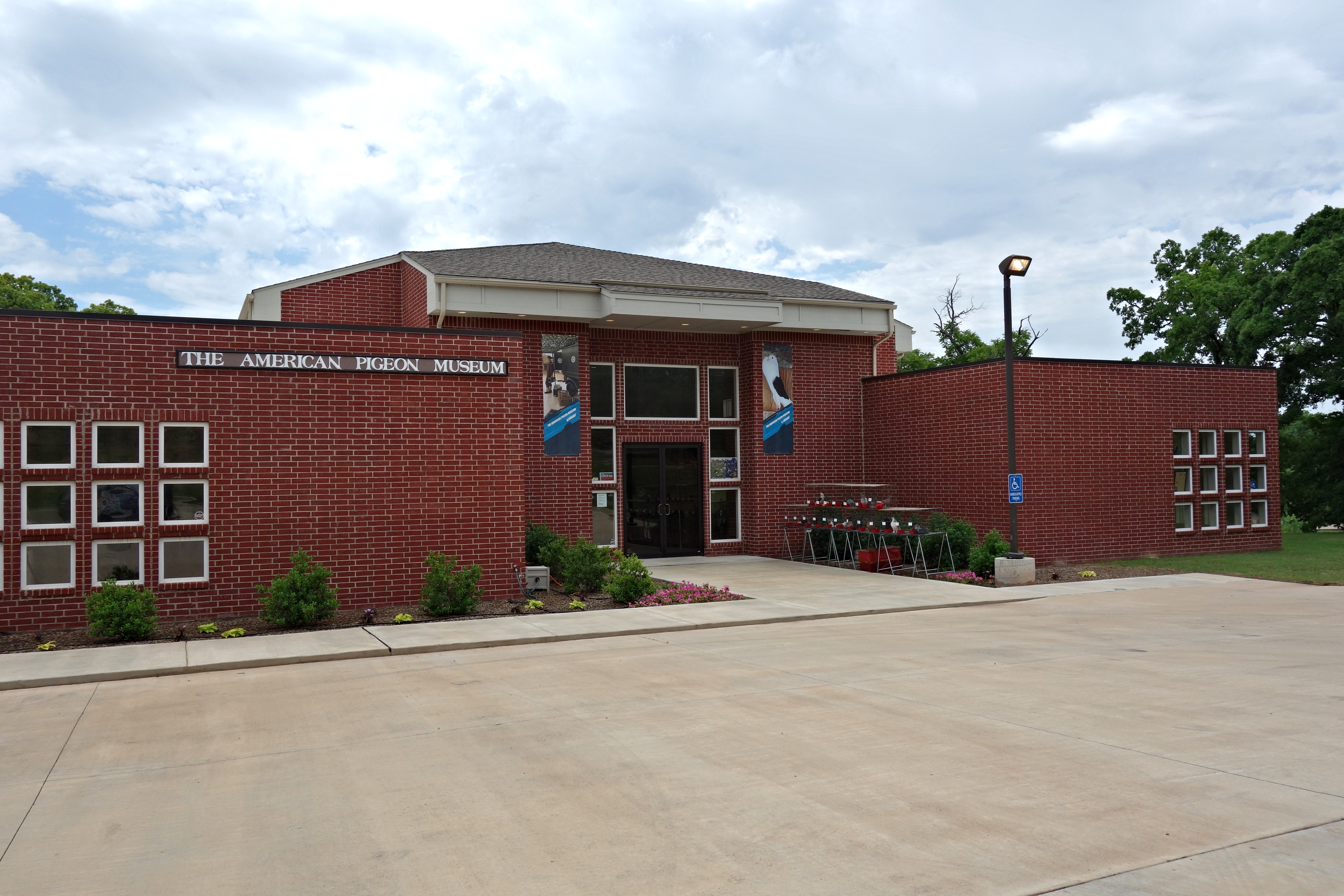
- Former names: American Homing Pigeon Institute (AHPI); The Pigeon Center of the Americas
- Established: 1993
- Location: 2300 Northeast 63rd Street, Oklahoma City, Oklahoma, U.S.
- Coordinates: 35°32′11″N 97°28′17″W
- Type: Natural history
- Owner: Alberto Gandara
- Website: Official website

The American Pigeon Museum & Library (APM&L) in Oklahoma City, Oklahoma, documents the history of pigeons and their domestication in the United States, with emphasis on the usage of homing pigeons during World War I and World War II. Founded as the American Homing Pigeon Institute (AHPI) in 1973, the current museum opened in 1993 and focused on pigeon racing but later expanded to its current scope.

== History ==
The American Homing Pigeon Institute was founded in 1973 in Wichita, Kansas, and focused on homing pigeons and the history of pigeon racing. Later, the museum expanded to include the total history of pigeon domestication.

In 1993, the AHPI purchased a 10 acres (4.0 ha) plot of land at 2308 Northeast 63rd Street and repurposed the existing buildings on the site to host the museum, library, aviary, and exhibition space, naming it the Pigeon Center of the Americas. The site was dedicated on March 27. In 2013, a new museum building was built next to the old one. The museum reopened to the public on June 13, 2014.

== Description ==
The APM&L is located in a 6,000 sq ft (560 m^{2}) building at 2300 Northeast 63rd Street in Oklahoma City. The site was chosen for its central location in Oklahoma and its proximity to Remington Park, major highways, and Route 66. The American Racing Pigeon Union is headquartered at the museum.

The museum's scope covers various pigeon species as well as their history, with emphasis on domestic and homing pigeons. There are three main sections: one on pigeon racing, another on the use of homing pigeons during World War I and World War II, and the last on the different species of fancy pigeons that are bred for appearances. While there is a focus on the United States, the collections include memorabilia and artifacts from several other countries. Artifacts include racing clocks, war memorabilia, paintings, and taxidermy specimens. The on-site library keeps a range of material on pigeons.

The museum also operates an aviary, called the World of Wings, which sits across the street from the main building, containing a flock of 200–250 pigeons. Some of the pigeons, many of which are loaned to the museum, are available to be viewed and handled by the public. The pigeons are kept in the sanctuary when they are not on display.
