= Dragoon (disambiguation) =

A dragoon is a soldier who fights on foot, but relocates on horseback.

Dragoon may also refer to:

== Places ==
- Dragoon, Arizona, an unincorporated community in Cochise County, Arizona
- Dragoon Mountains, a mountain range in Arizona, USA

== Military ==
- Colt Dragoon Revolver, a handgun that served in the American Civil War
- Dragon (firearm), the traditional eponymous weapon of dragoons
- Dragoon AFV, an American armoured fighting vehicle
- Operation Dragoon, the Allied invasion of Southern France during World War II
- M1296 Dragoon, an American infantry fighting vehicle
- 6th (Inniskilling) Dragoons, cavalry regiment of the British Army

== Arts, entertainment, and media ==
=== Fictional entities ===
- Dragoon, Tyson Granger's bit-beast in Beyblade
- Dragoon, a character class in the Final Fantasy series
- Dragoon, a Legendary Air Ride Machine in Kirby Air Ride
- Dragoon, a Protoss mechanized infantry unit from the Blizzard computer game StarCraft
- Acacia Dragoons, the military force in the video game Chrono Cross
- Egg Dragoon, a boss in the video games, Sonic Unleashed and Sonic Generations
- Magma Dragoon, a boss character from the game Mega Man X4

=== Games ===
- Panzer Dragoon (series), a series of Sega video games
  - Panzer Dragoon (video game), a 1995 rail-shooter Sega Saturn videogame
- The Legend of Dragoon, a 1999 role-playing PlayStation videogame

=== Other arts, entertainment, and media ===
- Dragoon (anime), a 1997 anime film
- The Enniskillen Dragoon, an Irish folk song

== Other uses ==
- Dragoon (pigeon), a variety of domestic pigeon

== See also ==
- Dragon (disambiguation)
