= Indian Gola =

Breed of pigeon

Classification

The Indian Gola is a small pigeon that looks similar to dragoon pigeons. This pigeon has red eyes and is a bird of speed and endurance. They have an average speed of 65-70 mph, and can fly more than 10–11 hours without stopping. It is a homing pigeon with a very good homing instinct, but cannot be used for racing because the adults cannot be trained. These pigeons always move freely; the only way to train them is by bringing them when they are 10–12 days old and feeding them by hand. Once they grow up and know their loft properly, they will try their level best to return to their loft.

== See also ==
- List of pigeon breeds
