= Up North Combine =

Pigeon racing association in England

The Up North Combine is an amalgamation of 23 pigeon racing Federations founded in 1905. Its headquarters are located at Sappers Corner in Greatham, Hartlepool, and the radius of serving federations go from Staithes (south) to Berwick (north). The combine is affiliated to and governed by the rules of the North of England Homing Union (NEHU).

The organisation was featured in a 1969 documentary, Time on the Wing, made by Turners Film Productions for Vaux Breweries on pigeon fancying and pigeon racing in the North East of England. This showed officials and convoy organisers discuss arrangements for the trip to the Vaux-Usher International Gold Tankard Pigeon Race which involved the transport of some 19,000 birds.

Tommy Newton of the Houghton Federation was the owner of the winner of the first race from Lille they organised in 2000, the first winner from that club since 1938.

== Officials ==
- President/Chairman: Mr John Groom
- Senior Vice President: Mr R Embleton
- Secretary: Ms K Goldsbrough
- Convoyer: Mr P. Maw

== List of affiliated federations ==
- Border Federation
- Coquetdale Federation
- Durham Middle Route Federation
- East Cleveland Federation
- Gateshead Federation
- Hartlepool Federation
- Hetton Federation
- Houghton Federation
- Mid Tyne Federation
- Middlesbrough & District Federation
- Newcastle West Federation
- North East Counties Federation
- North Yorkshire Federation
- Northumberland Premier Federation
- Shotton & Trimdon Federation
- South East Durham Federation
- South Shields Federation
- Sunderland & District Federation
- Sunderland Premier Federation
- Teesside Federation
- Tees Valley Federation
- Tynemouth Federation
- Wansbeck Federation

== Members ==
As of 2017 the combine had 23 Federations affiliated, 120 clubs affiliated and 2614 members.
