= Pigeon sport =

Sports involving the use of piegons as competitors

There are at least four main types of competitive pigeon sport:

- Pigeon racing
- Tumbling
- Highflying
- Tippler (Endurance)

Though not quite a sport, fancy breeds of pigeons are also bred to standards and judged in a competitive fashion. Levi, in his book The Pigeon, describes all aspects of pigeon keeping. For exhibition purposes sport pigeons are sometimes grouped as Flying/Sporting Pigeons.

== See also ==
- Birmingham Roller
- List of pigeon breeds
