= Antwerp Smerle =

Breed of pigeon

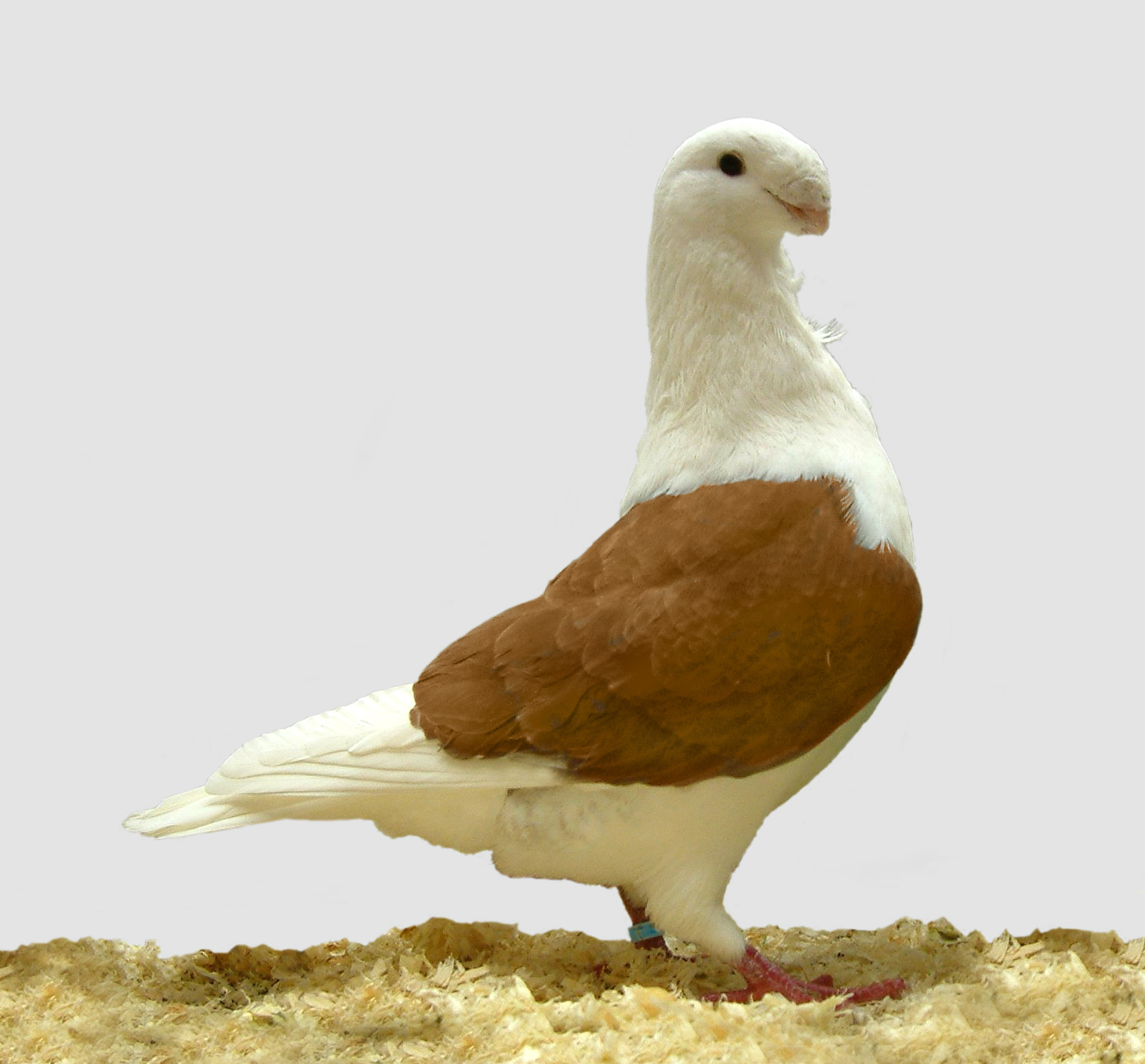
- Yellow Antwerp Smerle
- Conservation status: Common
- Country of origin: Belgium

Classification
- US Breed Group: Flying

The Antwerp Smerle is a breed of fancy pigeon developed over many years of selective breeding. Antwerp Smerles, along with other varieties of domesticated pigeons, are all descendants from the rock pigeon (Columba livia). The Smerle was one of the breeds used in the development of the Racing Homer.

== Gallery ==
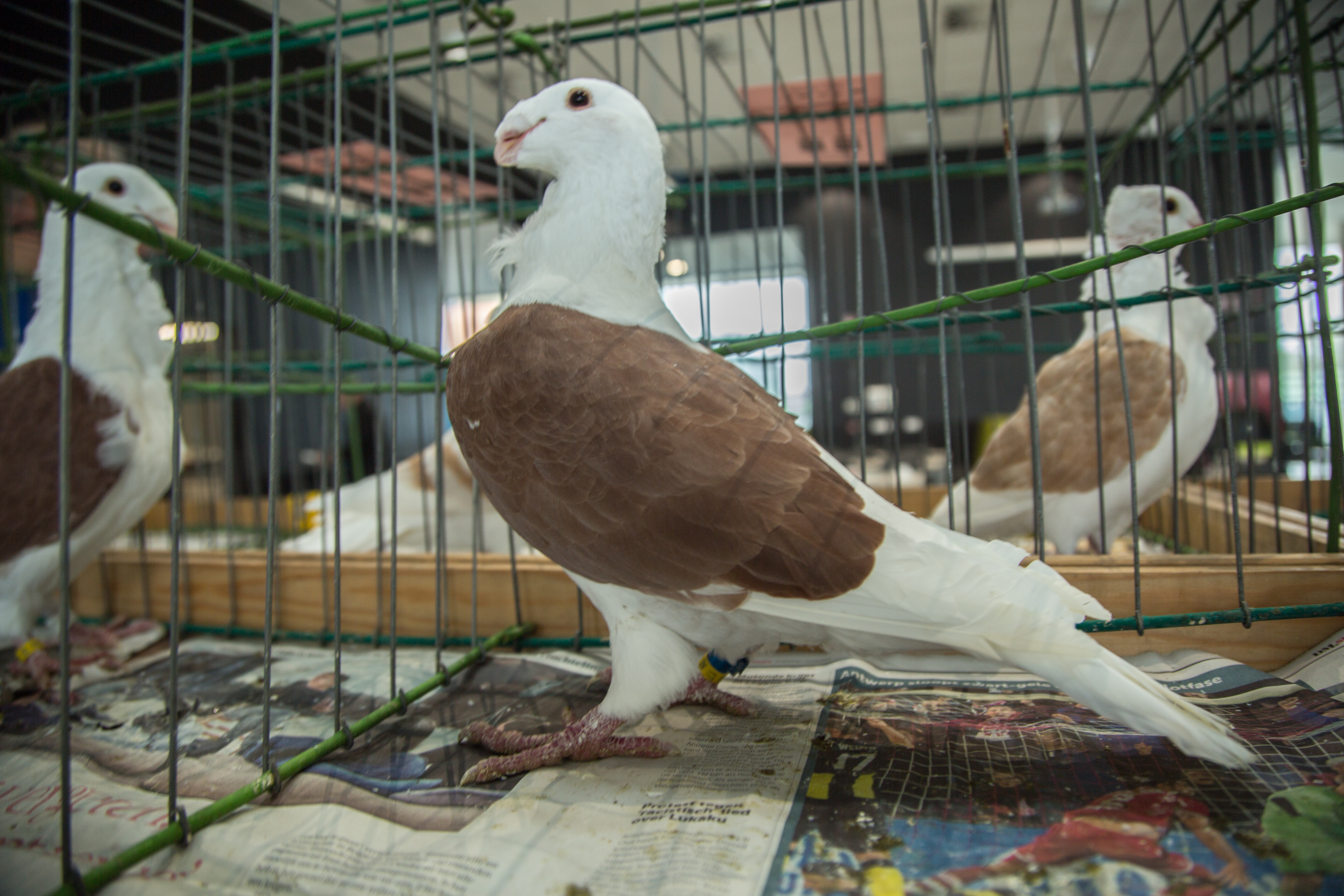
Dark Red Check

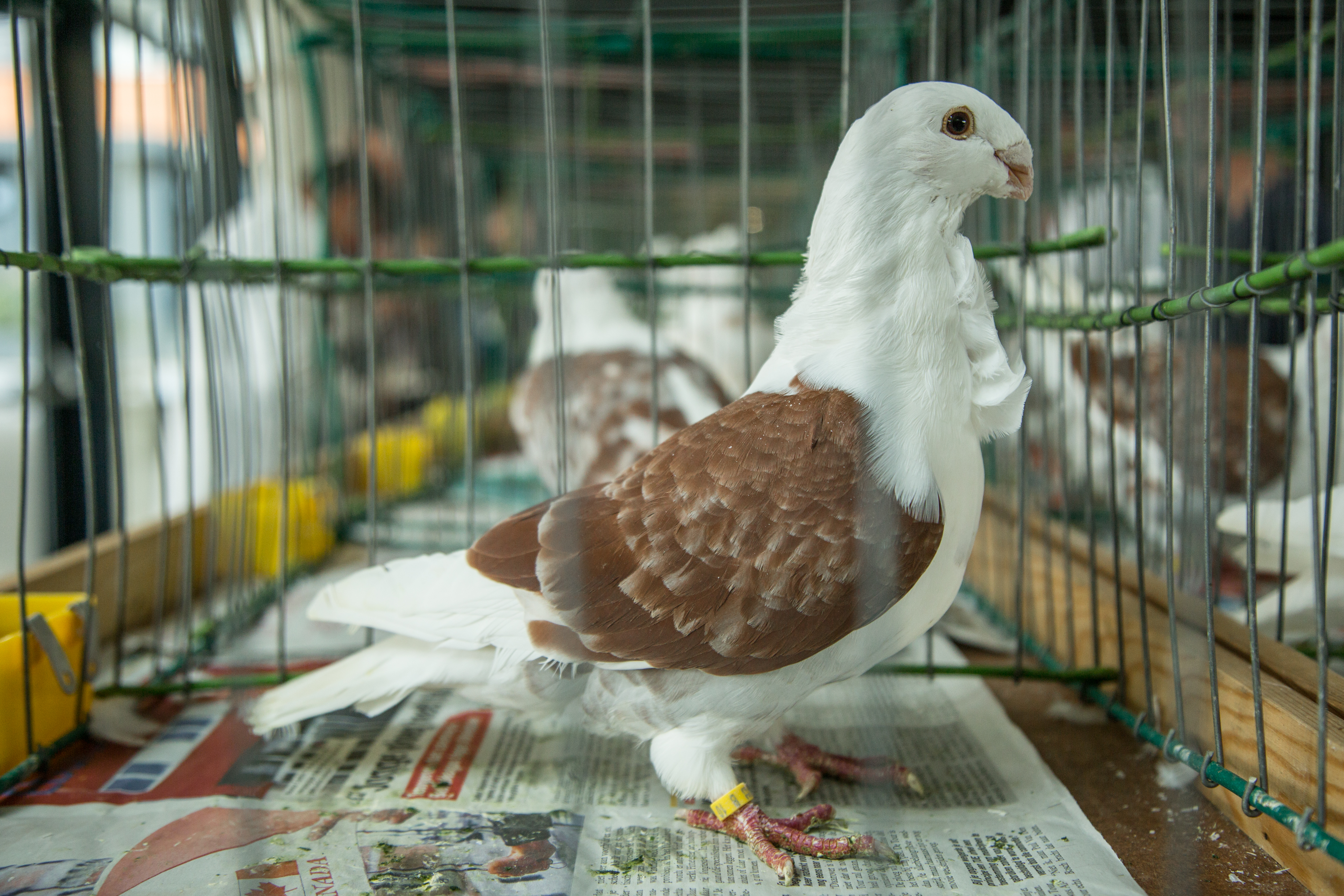
Light Red Check

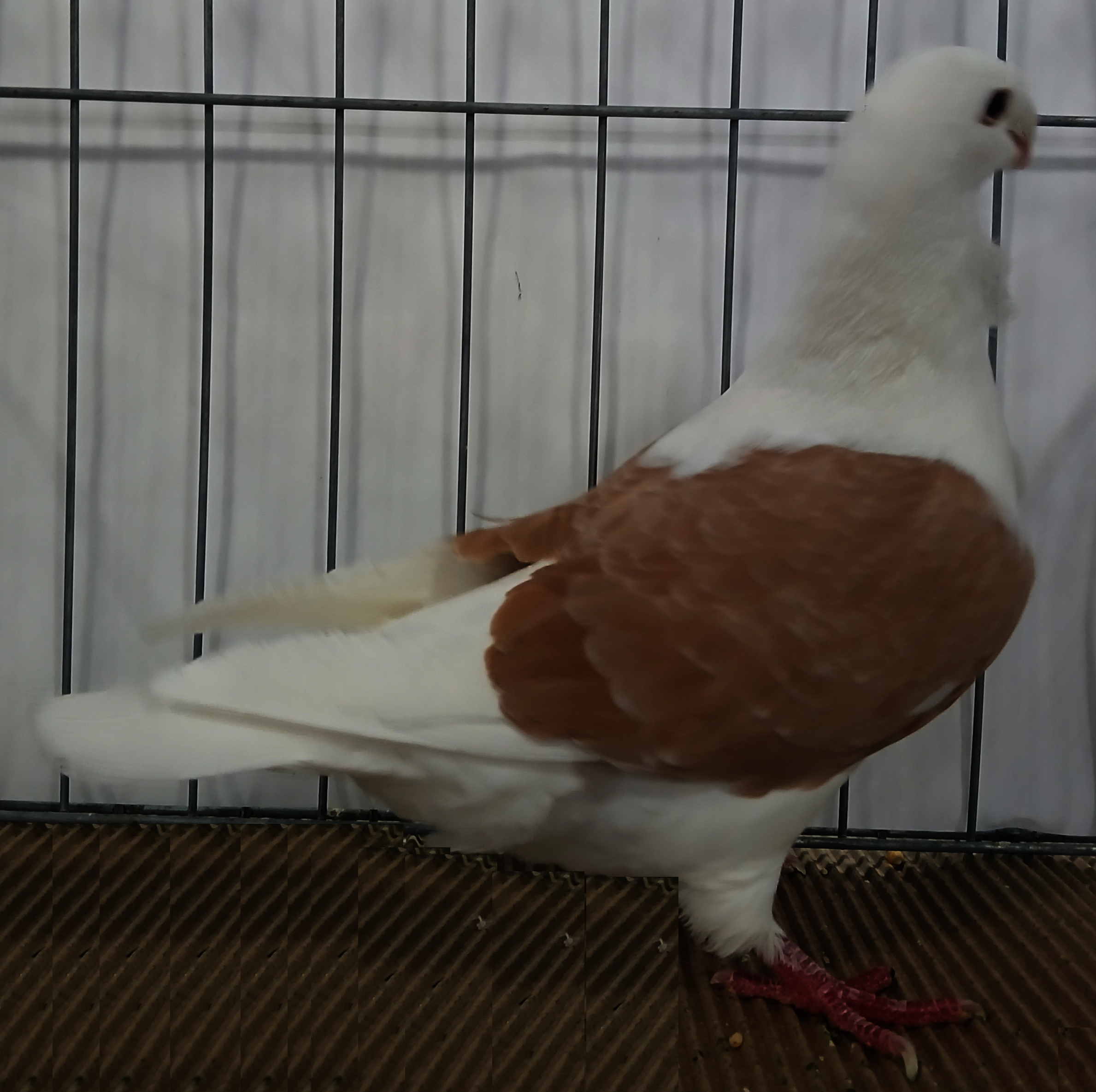
Yellow

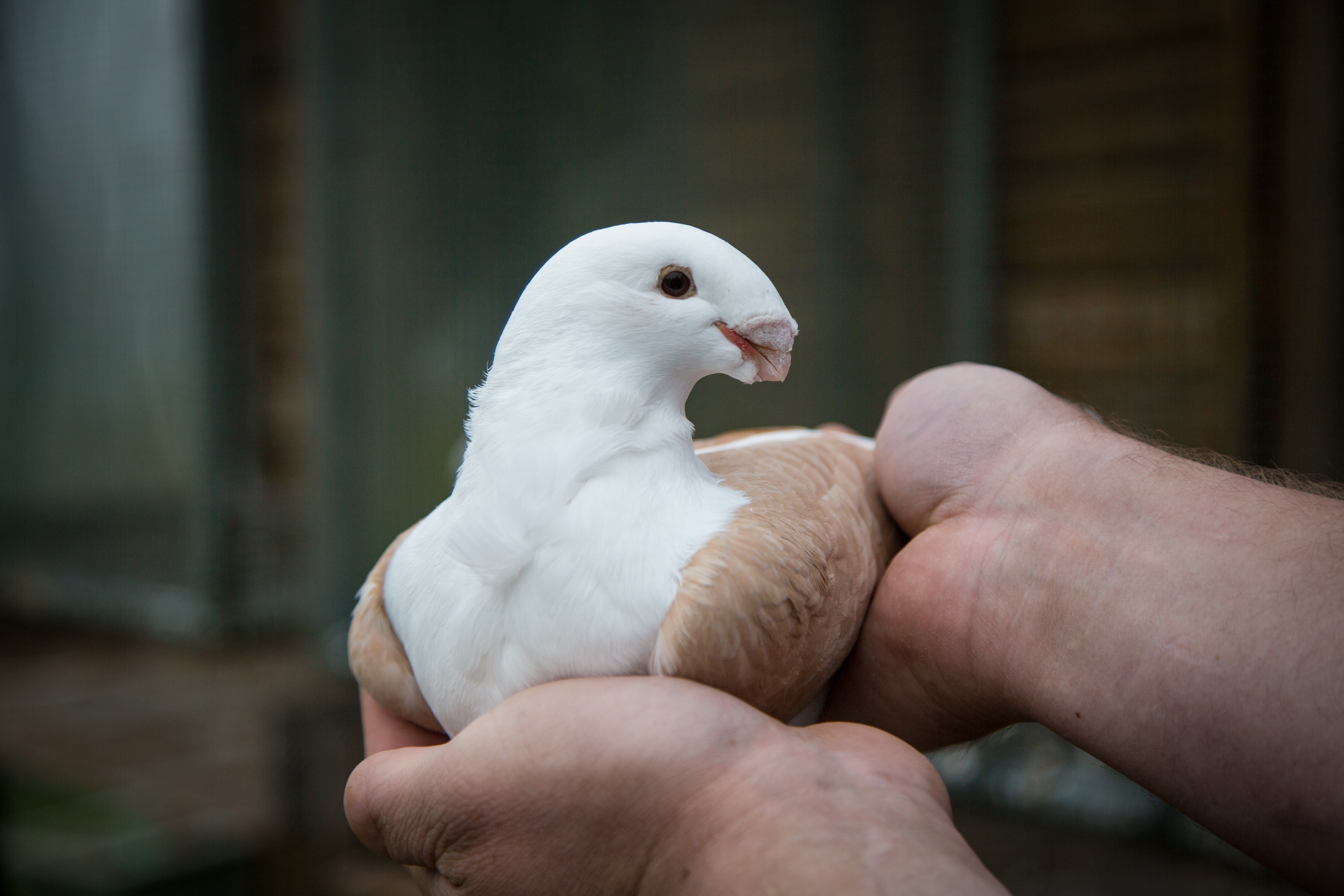
Head View

== See also ==
- List of pigeon breeds
- American Pigeon Journal April 1967
- American Pigeon Journal April 1932
- Antwerp Smerle Breed Guide - Pigeonpedia
- Pigeon keeping
  - Pigeon Diet
  - Pigeon Housing
