= American Racing Pigeon Union =

The American Racing Pigeon Union (AU) is a national organization for pigeon racing hobbyists. The organization was founded November 9, 1910, in Washington, D.C., to centralize regional clubs, establish standardized rules, award cash prizes and promote the racing of homing carrier pigeons.

The AU comprises approximately 700 affiliated clubs with a membership 7,500 members. The national office is located in Oklahoma City, Oklahoma, adjacent to the American Pigeon Museum & Library.
