= Dragoon pigeon =

Breed of pigeon

Dragoon
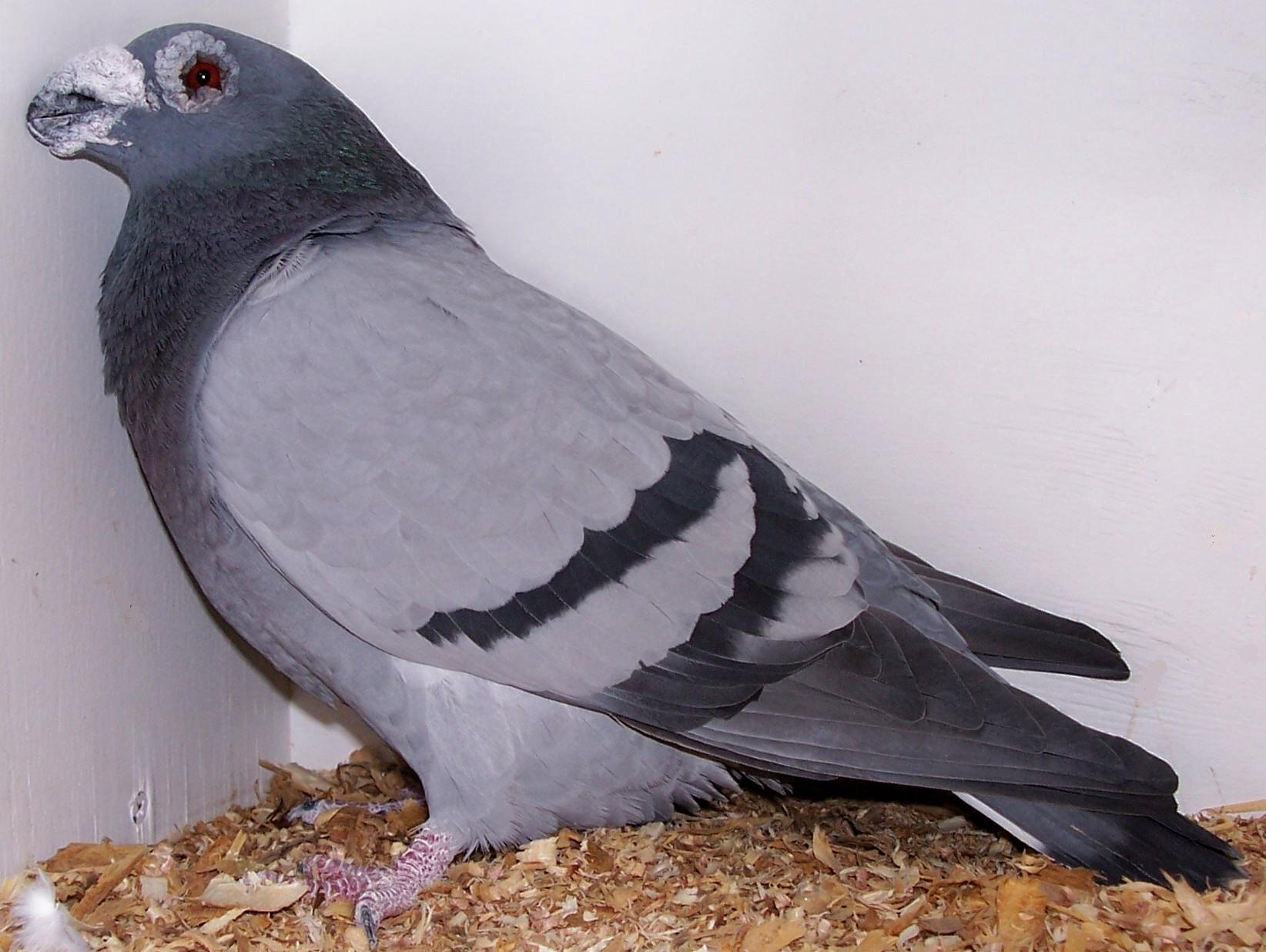
- Blue bar Dragoon pigeon
- Conservation status: Common
- Country of origin: United Kingdom

Classification
- US Breed Group: Fancy

Notes
- At one time, the most popular breed of pigeon kept in the UK

The Dragoon is a breed of fancy pigeon developed over many years of selective breeding. Dragoons, along with other varieties of domesticated pigeons, are all descendants of the wild rock dove (Columba livia). The Dragoon was one of the breeds used in the development of the Racing Homer. A very old breed of British origin, referred to by Moore (1735).

A similar looking pigeon is the Indian Gola, but the Gola has more mottled wings.

== Gallery ==
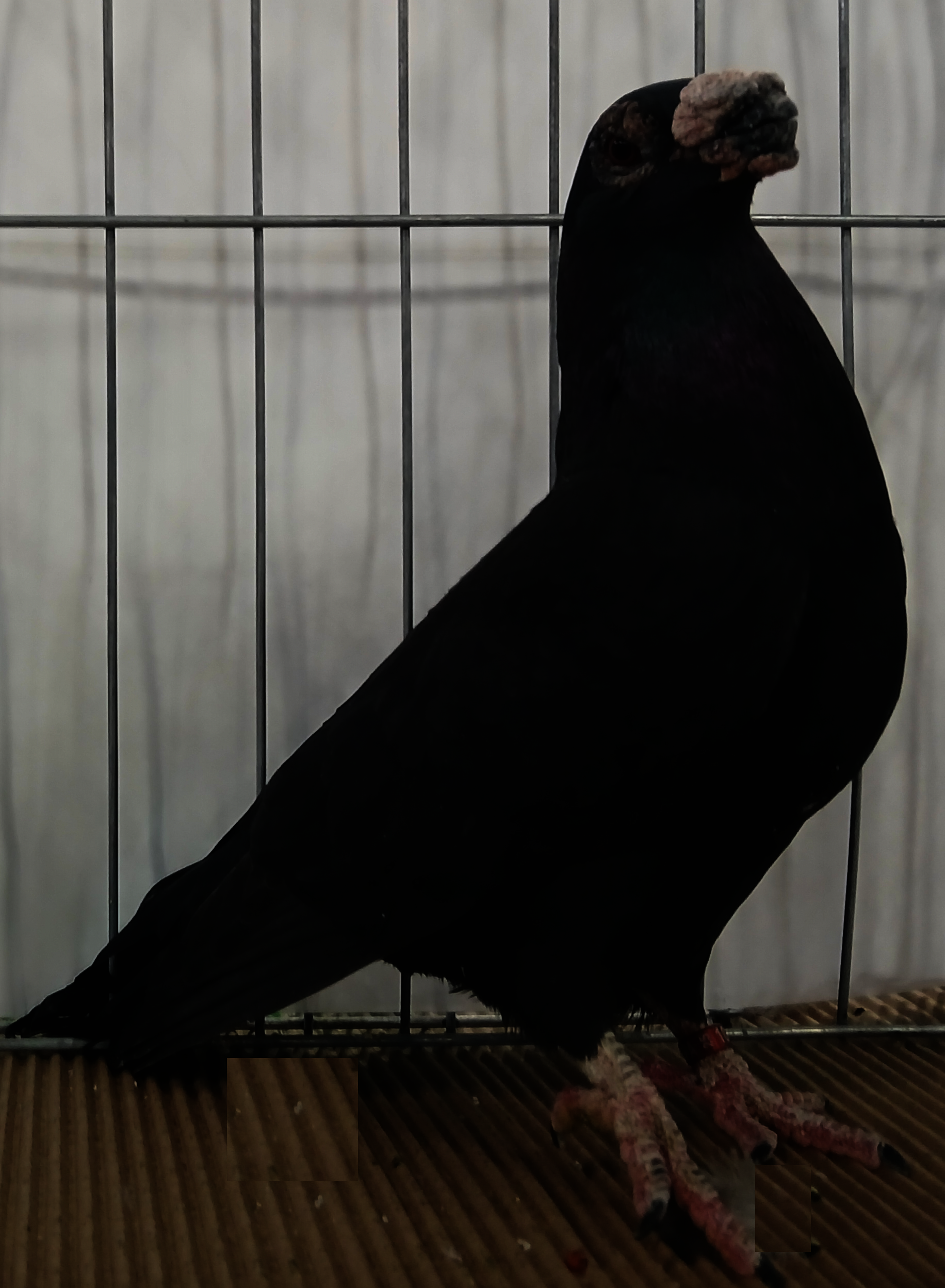
Black

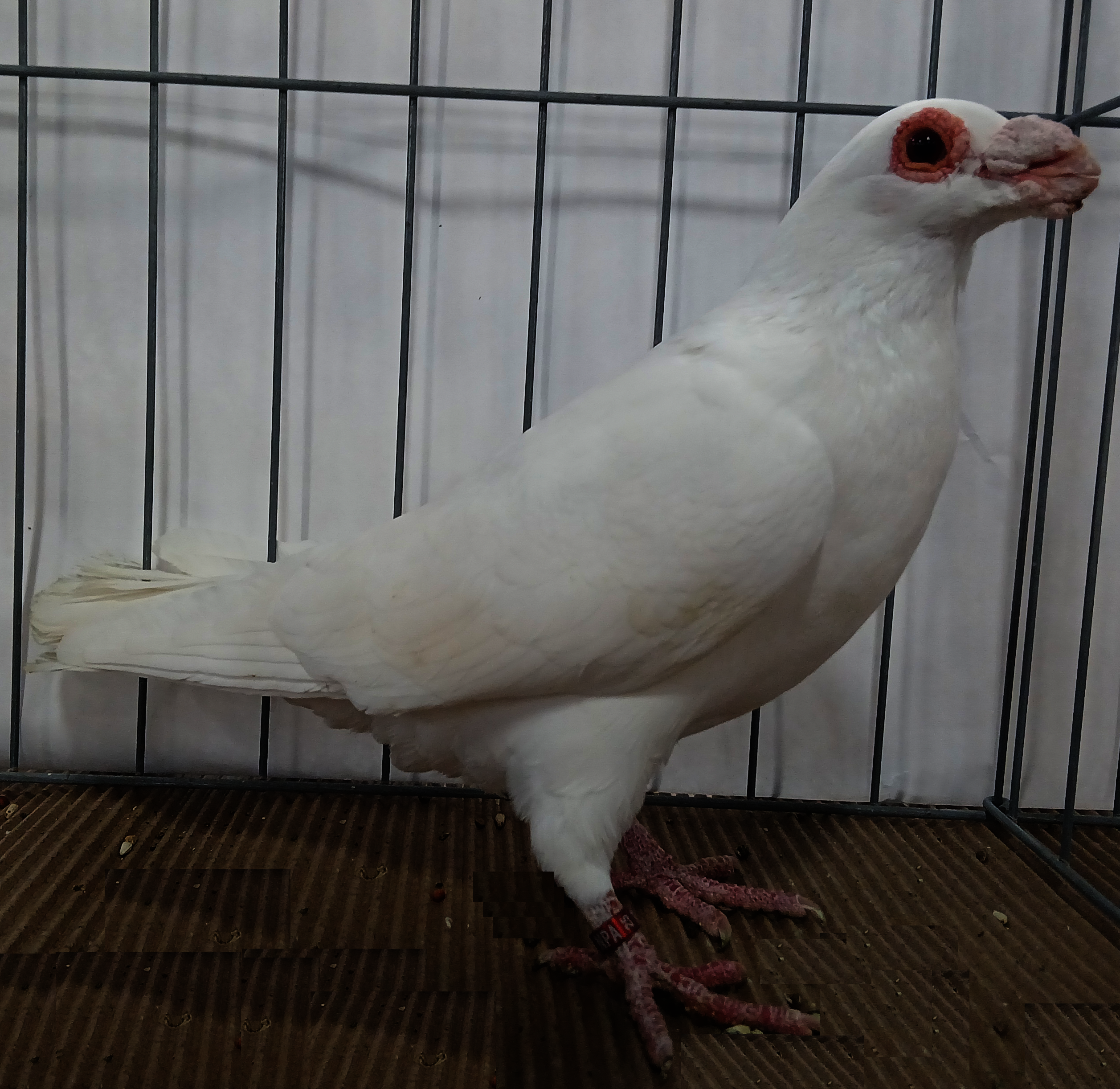
White

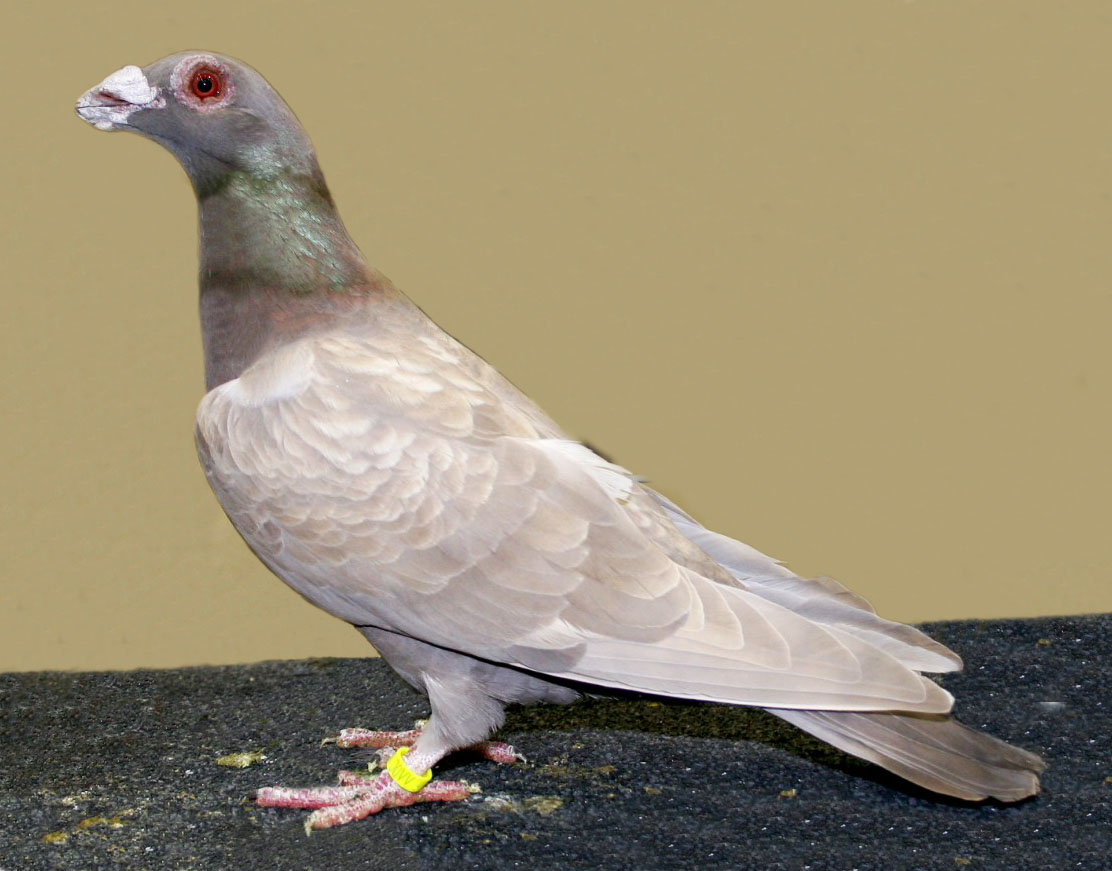
Brown

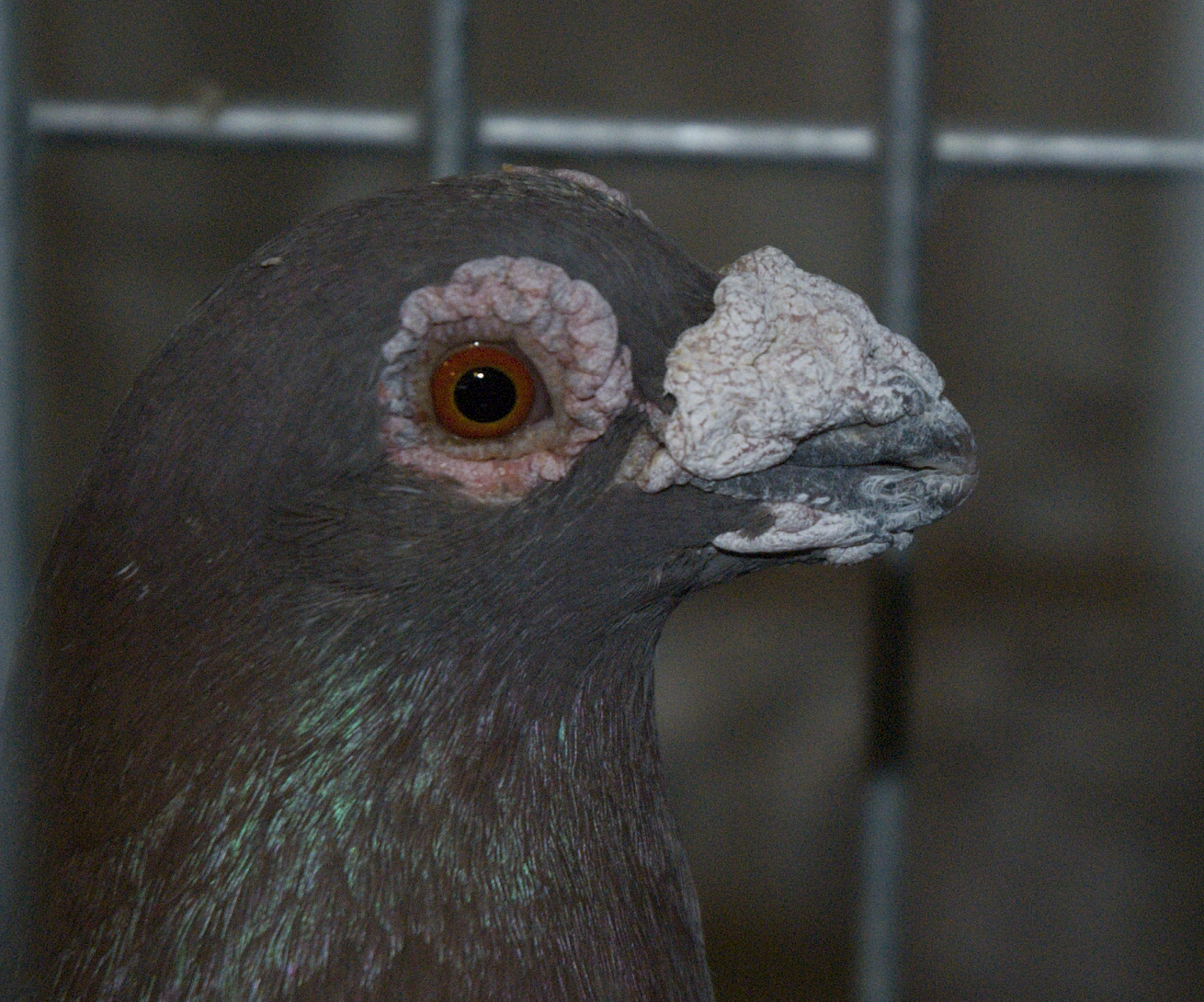
Head

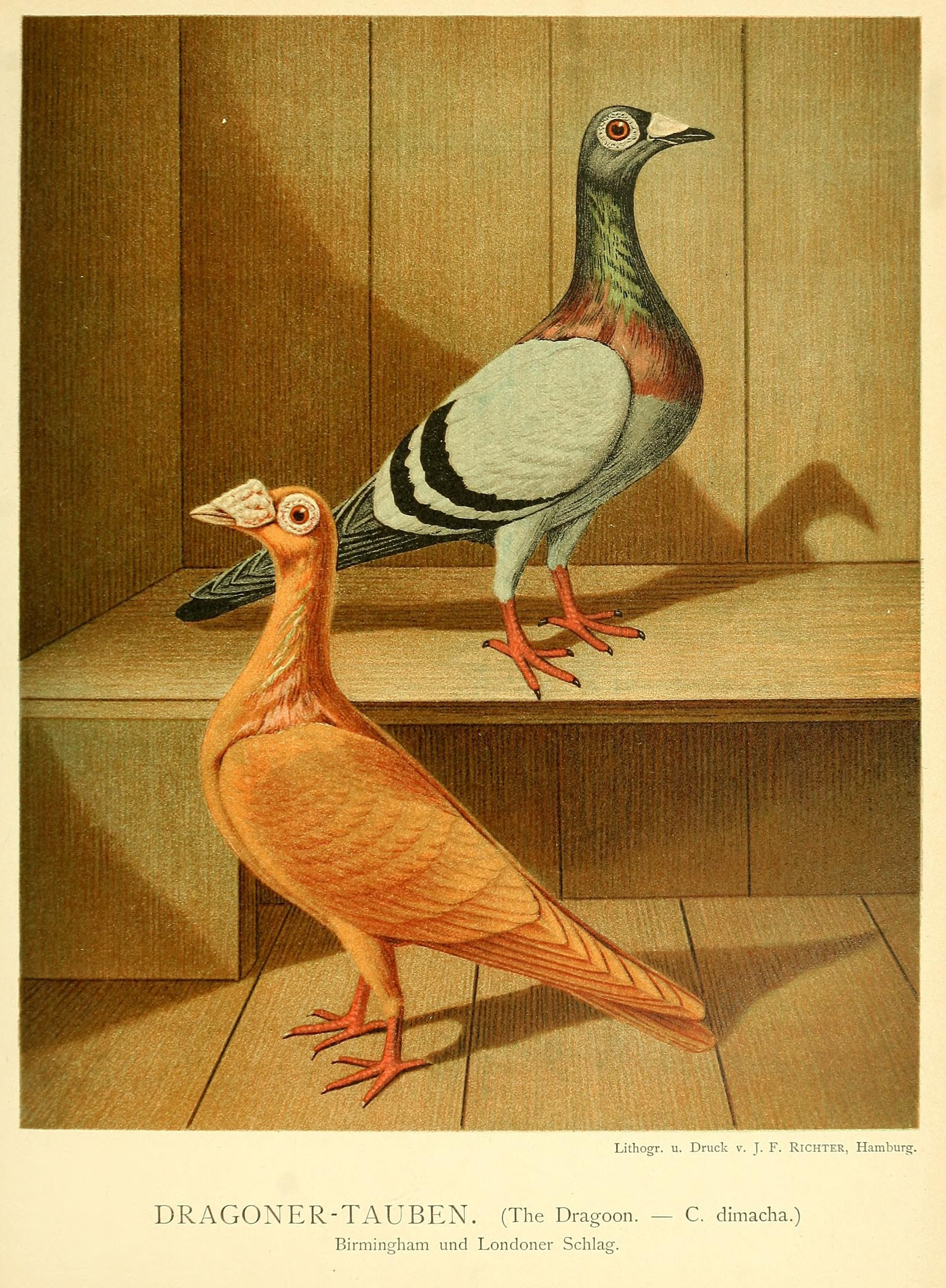
Illustrirtes Mustertauben-Buch Plate 34

== See also ==
- Pigeon Diet
- Pigeon Housing
- List of pigeon breeds
