= Royal Pigeon Racing Association =

British governing body for pigeon racing

- Founded: 18 March 1896
- Type: Sporting Association
- Members: 21,000
- Key people: Queen Elizabeth II
- Website: www.rpra.org

The Royal Pigeon Racing Association (RPRA) is a governing body for pigeon racing in the United Kingdom. Queen Elizabeth II was president of the RPRA and also an enthusiastic pigeon fancier herself. The RPRA has 21,000 members spread across 1,500 pigeon clubs in the UK. The association performs charity work and raises approximately £100,000 for charitable causes each year.
