= Pigeon racing =

Competition sport in which trained pigeons have to fly home as fast as possible

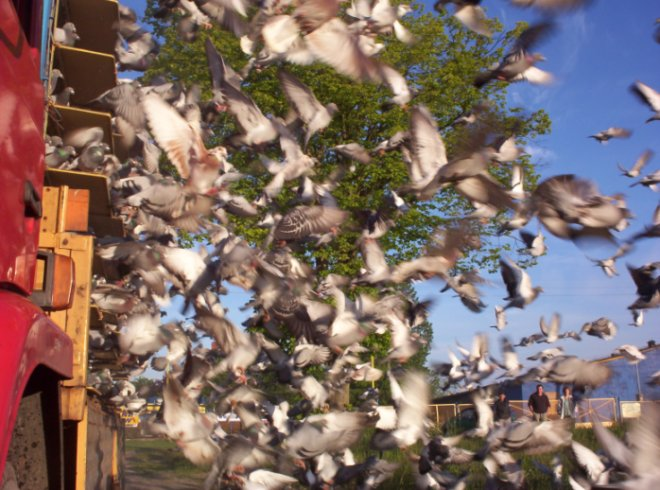
Pigeons being released from a modified truck to race in Kamień Pomorski, Poland

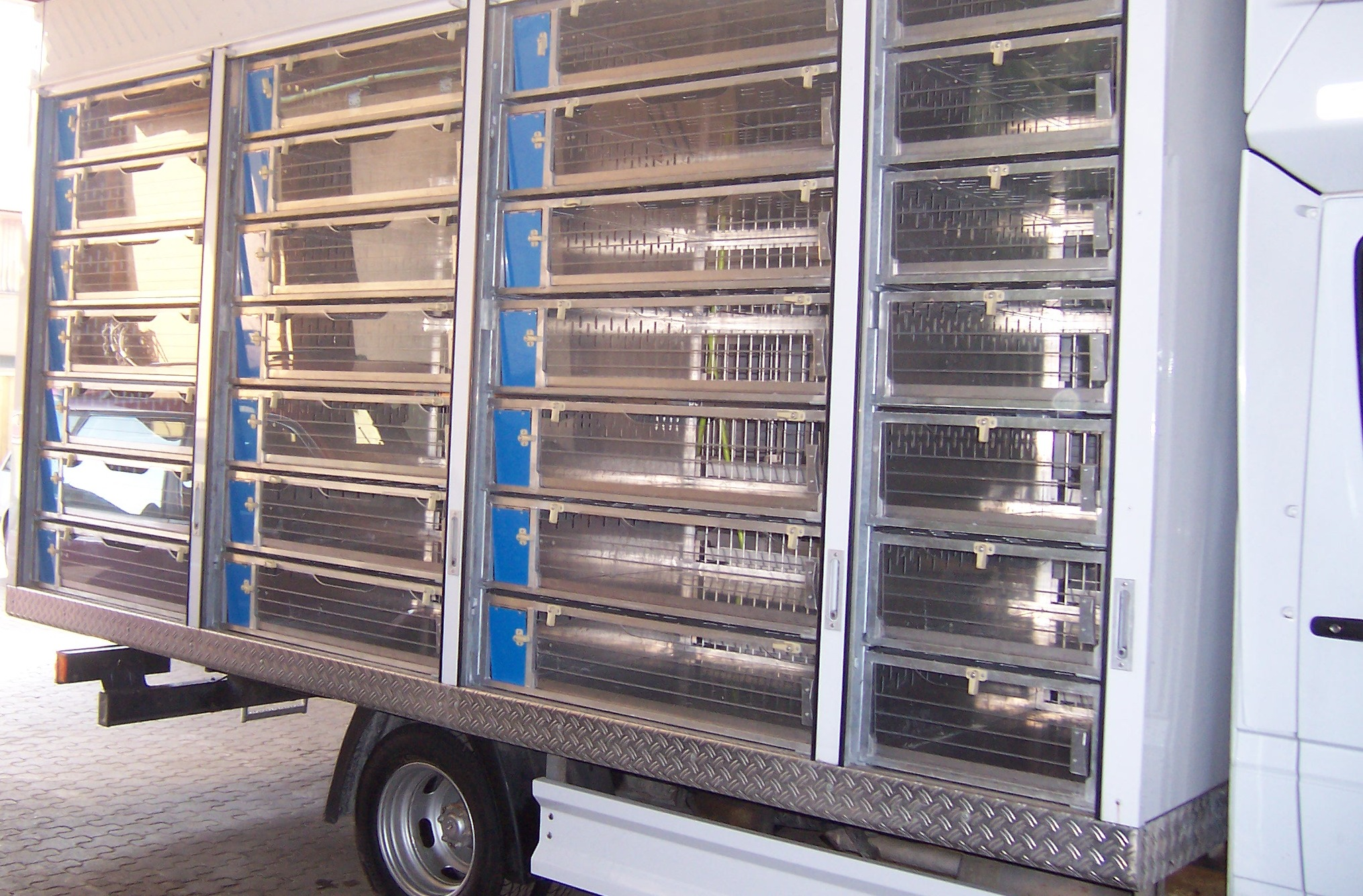
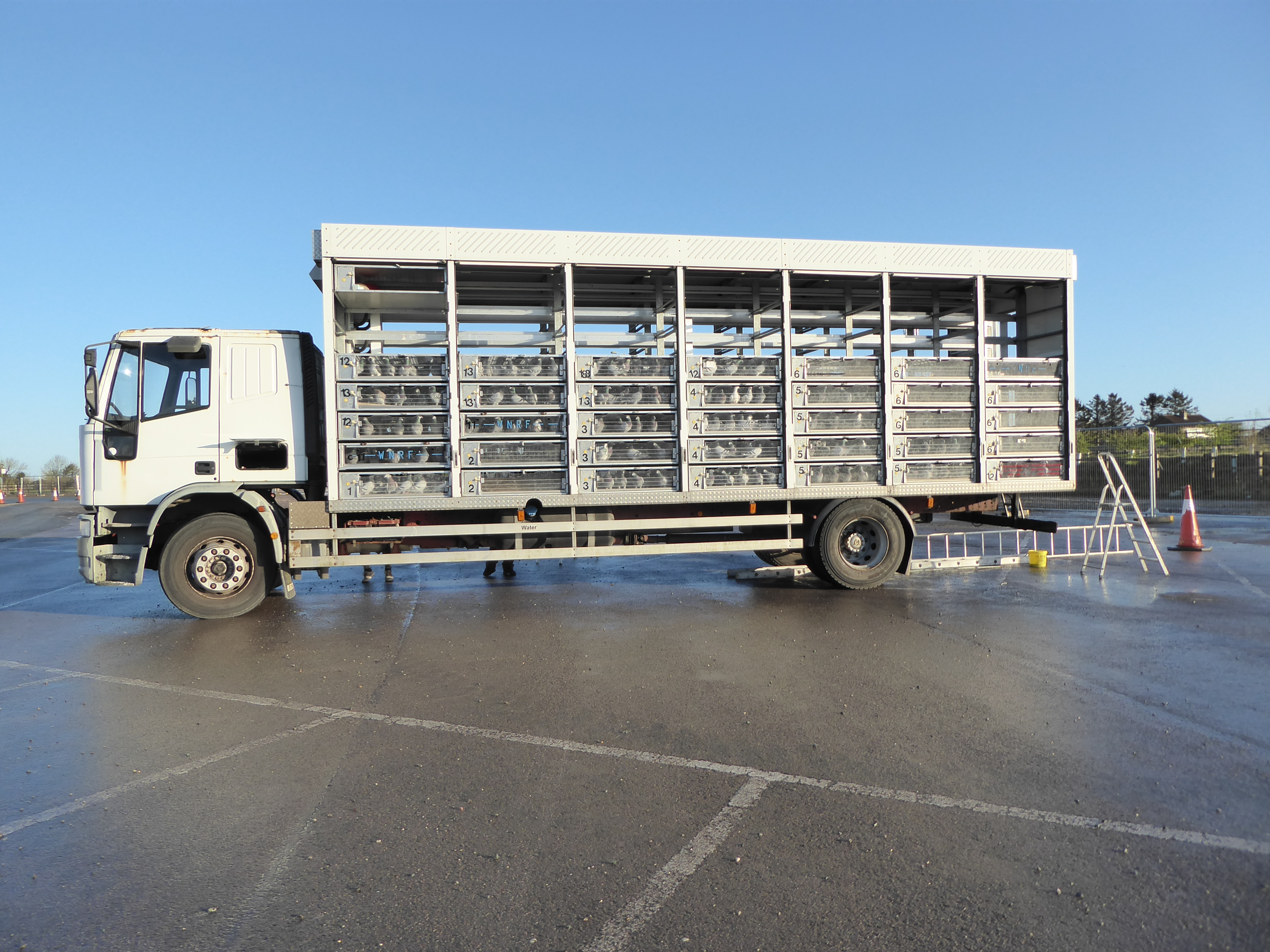
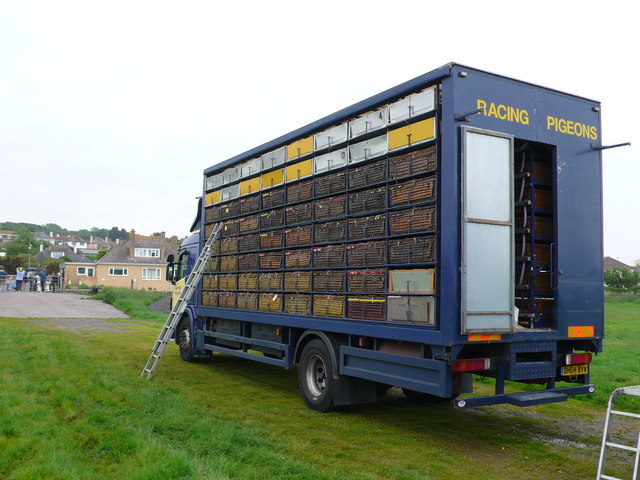
Racing pigeons are often transported in specially modified trucks.

Pigeon racing is the sport of releasing specialized, trained homing pigeons, which then return to their homes over a carefully measured distance. The time it takes the animal to cover the specified distance is measured, and the bird's rate of travel is calculated and compared with all of the other pigeons in the race to determine which animal returned at the highest speed.

Pigeon racing requires a specific breed of pigeon bred for the sport, the Racing Homer. Competing pigeons are specially trained and conditioned for races that vary in distance from approximately 100 kilometres (62 mi) to 1,000 kilometres (620 mi). Despite these lengths, races can be won and lost by seconds, so many different timing and measuring devices have been developed. The traditional timing method involves rubber rings being placed into a specially designed clock, whereas a newer development uses RFID tags to record arrival time.

While there is no definite proof, there are compelling reasons to believe the sport of racing pigeons may go back at least as far as 220 AD. It is recorded in the Mishnah that pigeon racers are forbidden from bearing witness. The Sultan of Baghdad set up a pigeon post system in AD 1150, and Genghis Khan used pigeons to carry messages to aid his military intelligence. The sport achieved a great deal of popularity in Belgium in the mid-19th century. The pigeon fanciers of Belgium were so taken with the hobby that they began to develop pigeons specially cultivated for fast flight and long endurance called Voyageurs. From Belgium, the modern version of the sport and the Voyageurs which the Flemish fanciers developed spread to most parts of the world. Once quite popular, the sport has experienced a downturn in participants in some parts of the world in recent years, possibly due to the rising cost of living, aging fanciers, and a severe lack of public interest.

One recent development in the sport of pigeon racing is "one loft racing", where birds are raced against each other under the same training regimen, from the same location. The principle being to find the best individual race bird irrespective of the race trainer. This will determine which bird is the most successful.

== History ==
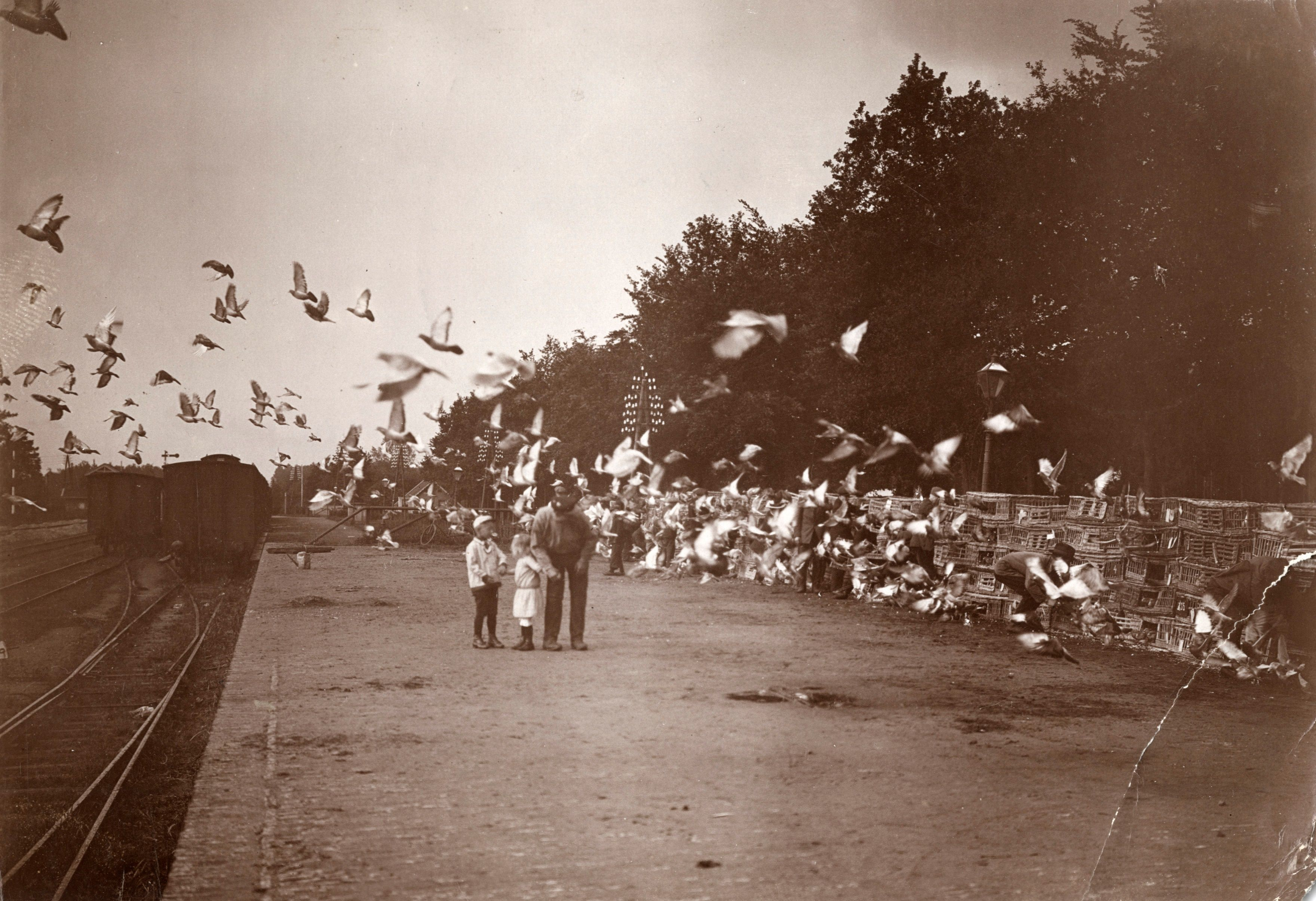
Racing pigeons being released from wicker baskets in Assen, Netherlands c.1916

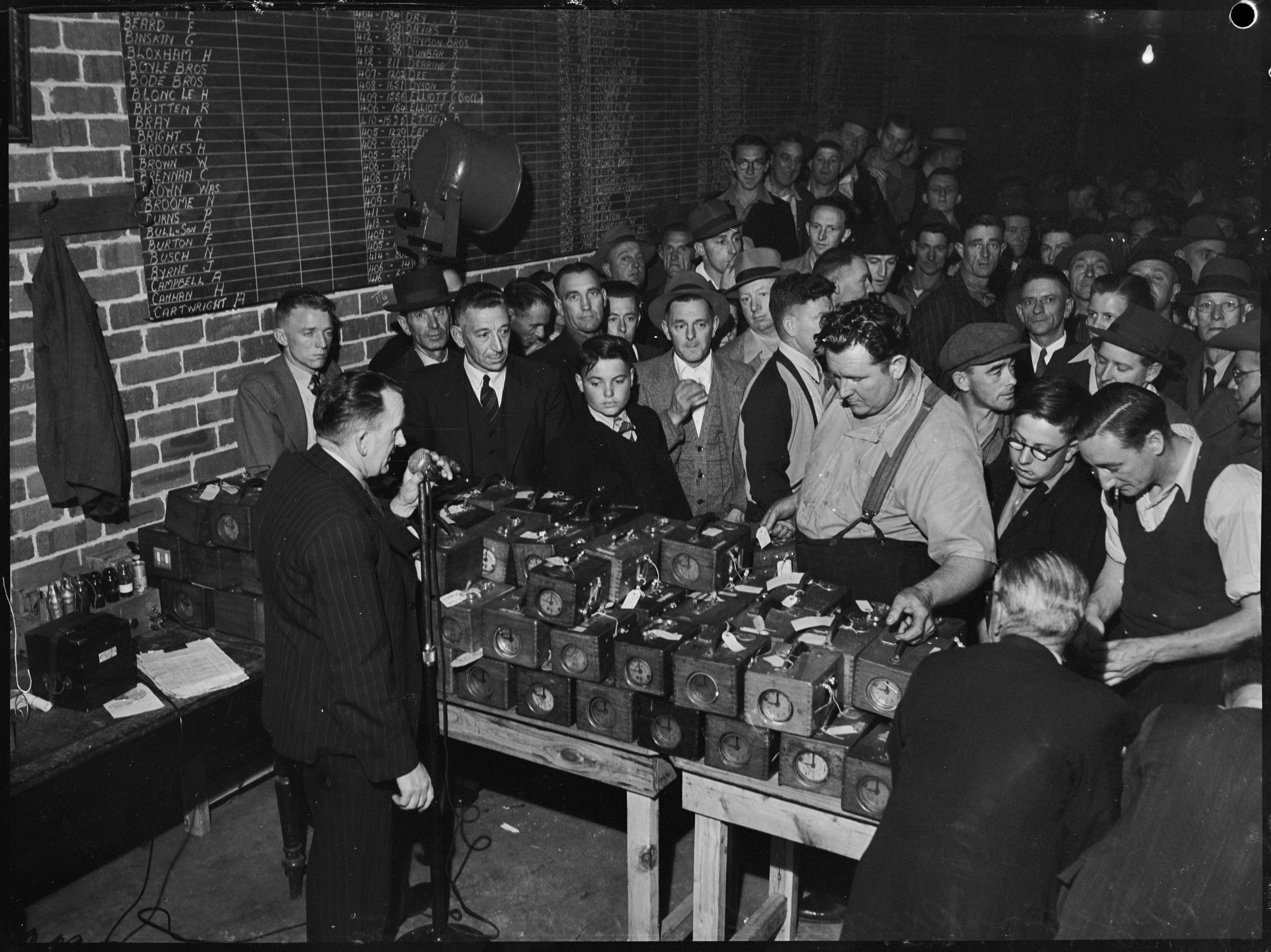
Pigeon Racers with clocks, Australia, 1945

The pigeon is the oldest domesticated bird. The predecessors of modern-day racing pigeons were pigeons bred for their homing ability, primarily to carry messages. "Pigeon posts" have been established all over the world and while mainly used in the military, some are still in service today. Modern pigeon racing originated in Belgium in the mid-19th century. Racing pigeons were first developed in Belgium and England at the same time. They are the result of crossing of a number of other breeds, primarily the Smerle, French Cumulet, English Carrier, Dragoon, and the Horseman (now lost). From the high-flying Cumulet, the Homer received its endurance and its ability to fly for hours on end without tiring. From the Carrier, it inherited the ability to find its way home from great distances.

The sport was aided by several new technologies of the era. The advent of railways permitted pigeons to be sent to distant release points quickly and at modest cost. In addition, the creation of mass-produced, sophisticated timing clocks brought accurate and secure timing to the sport. These clocks were designed with special compartments where an entry band, removed from the returning bird, was placed. When struck, the clock recorded the time and also placed the band in a compartment that could only be opened by race officials.

Before electronic communications, such as the telegraph and telephone, Reuters, the world's largest news agency, began as a pigeon service carrying closing stock prices between Belgium and Germany. This was basically between the western and eastern termini of the telegraph in Europe.

The most expensive pigeon ever sold was "New Kim" which was purchased for $US1.9 million by a bidder from China in November 2020.

== Racing ==
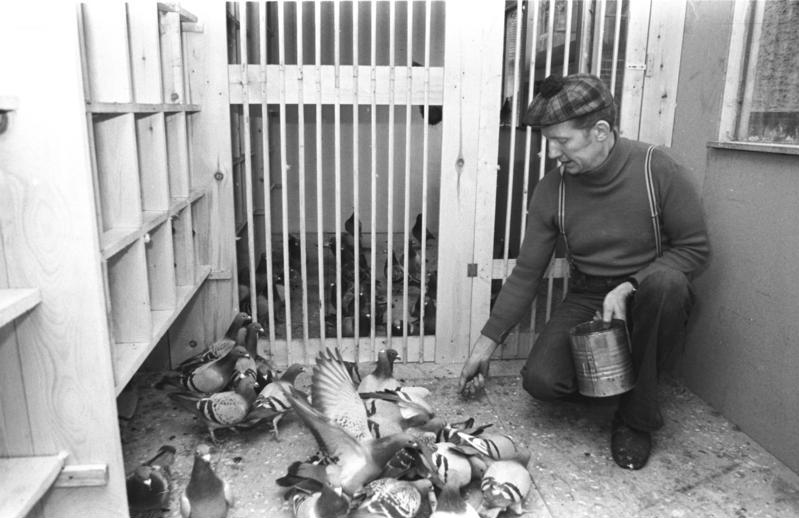
A fancier with racing pigeons

Pigeon racing has been described as the "sport with a single starting gate and a thousand finish lines." In short, competing birds are taken from their lofts and must race home. The time taken and distance are recorded, and the fastest bird is declared the winner. Races are generally between 100 kilometres (62 mi) and 1,000 kilometres (620 mi) in distance. In the United States, flights of up to 1,800 kilometres (1,100 mi) have been recorded.

Provided it survives the many hazards associated with racing, a single pigeon could compete from about six months of age and still be in competition at over ten years of age. Such feats are uncommon; the average racing career spans three to four years. Hazards can also come from weather conditions on the day of the race. Pigeons can become grounded and disoriented, and therefore not finish the race.

In the early days of racing, paint was used to identify birds for owners. Belgium then developed an 1/8-inch (3.2 mm) brass leg band, which was sent to racers in America to use. Since then, to compete in a race, it must wear a permanent, unique numbered ring or band that is placed on its leg at about five days old. For a race to be conducted, the competing pigeons must be entered into the race, usually at the organization's clubhouse, and taken away from their home to be released at a predetermined time and location. The distance between the bird's home loft and the race point is carefully measured by GPS and the time taken by the bird to return is measured using one of the two acceptable timing methods. Occasionally in some leagues, there are two divisions: one for the young birds (usually yearlings in their first year of competition) and another for older birds.

=== Traditional timing method ===
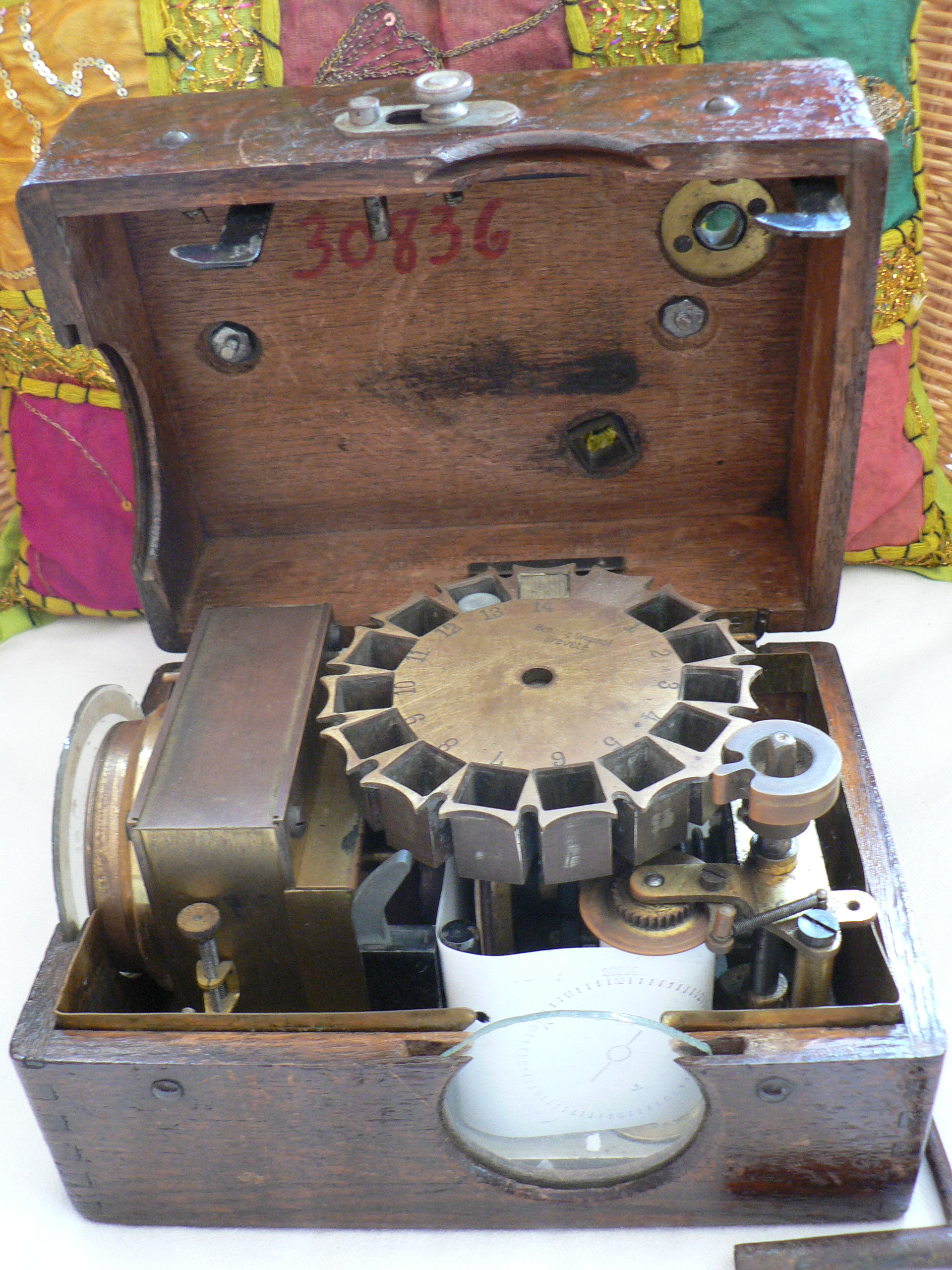
Inside an older pigeon clock

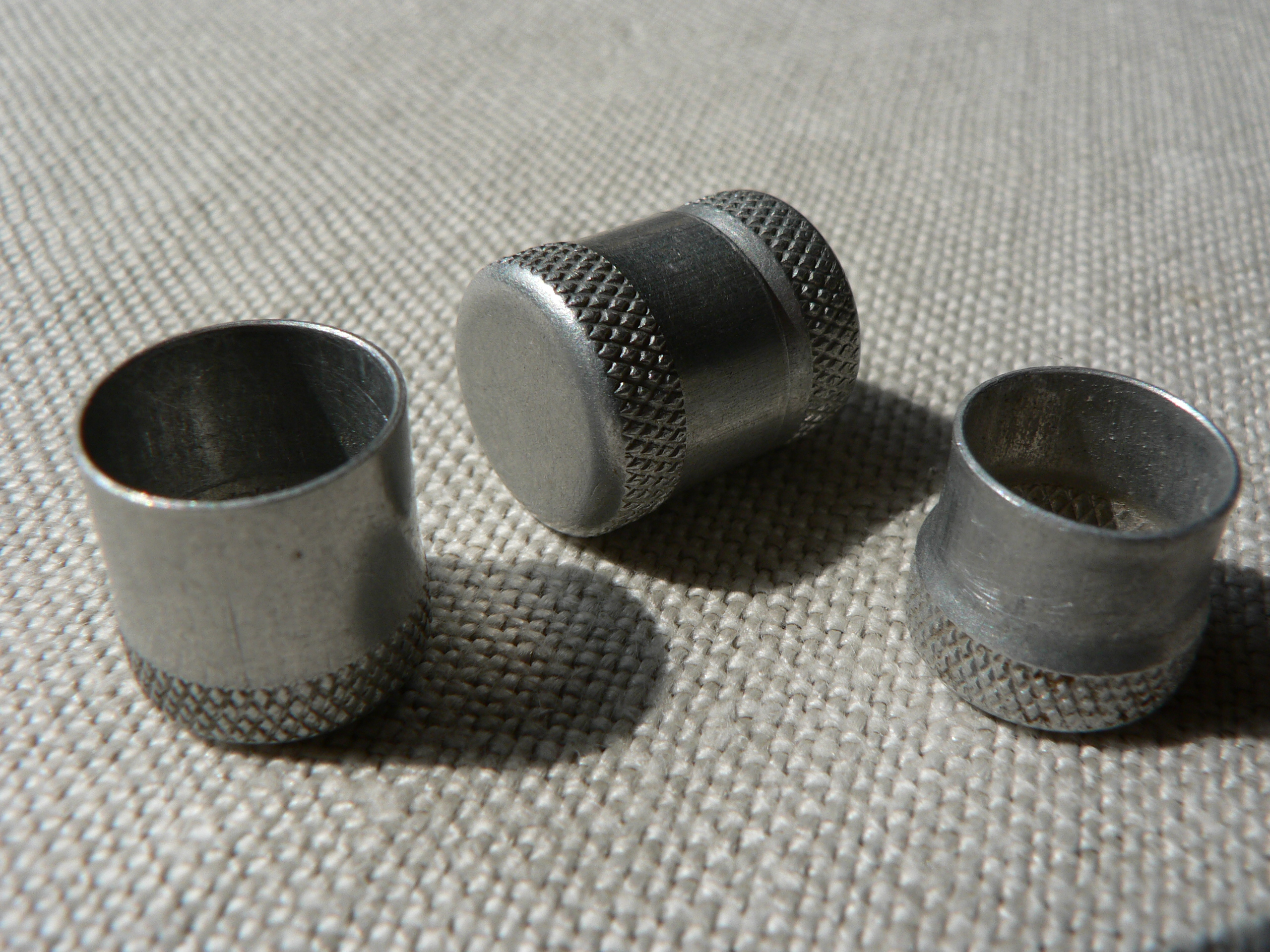
Some old style pigeon clocks use thimbles.

The traditional method of timing racing pigeons involves rubber rings with unique identification numbers and a specially designed pigeon racing clock. The ring is attached around the bird's leg before being sent to race. The serial number is recorded, the clock is set and sealed, and the bird carries the ring home. When the first bird returns, its trainer removes the ring and places it in a slot in the clock. The time at which the ring was placed in the clock is recorded as the official time that the competing bird arrived home. From this time stamp, an average speed is measured and a winner of the race can be found.

Although serving its purpose, this method has proved somewhat problematic for a few reasons:

- The pigeon's "official time" is not the actual time it arrived; it is the time the ring was removed, placed in the clock and recorded, which could be many vital seconds later.
- Exceptional pigeons may arrive home first on multiple occasions. Knowing it is going to have the ring removed speedily, which may be uncomfortable, the pigeon could be reluctant to enter the loft for the trainer.

=== Electronic timing method ===
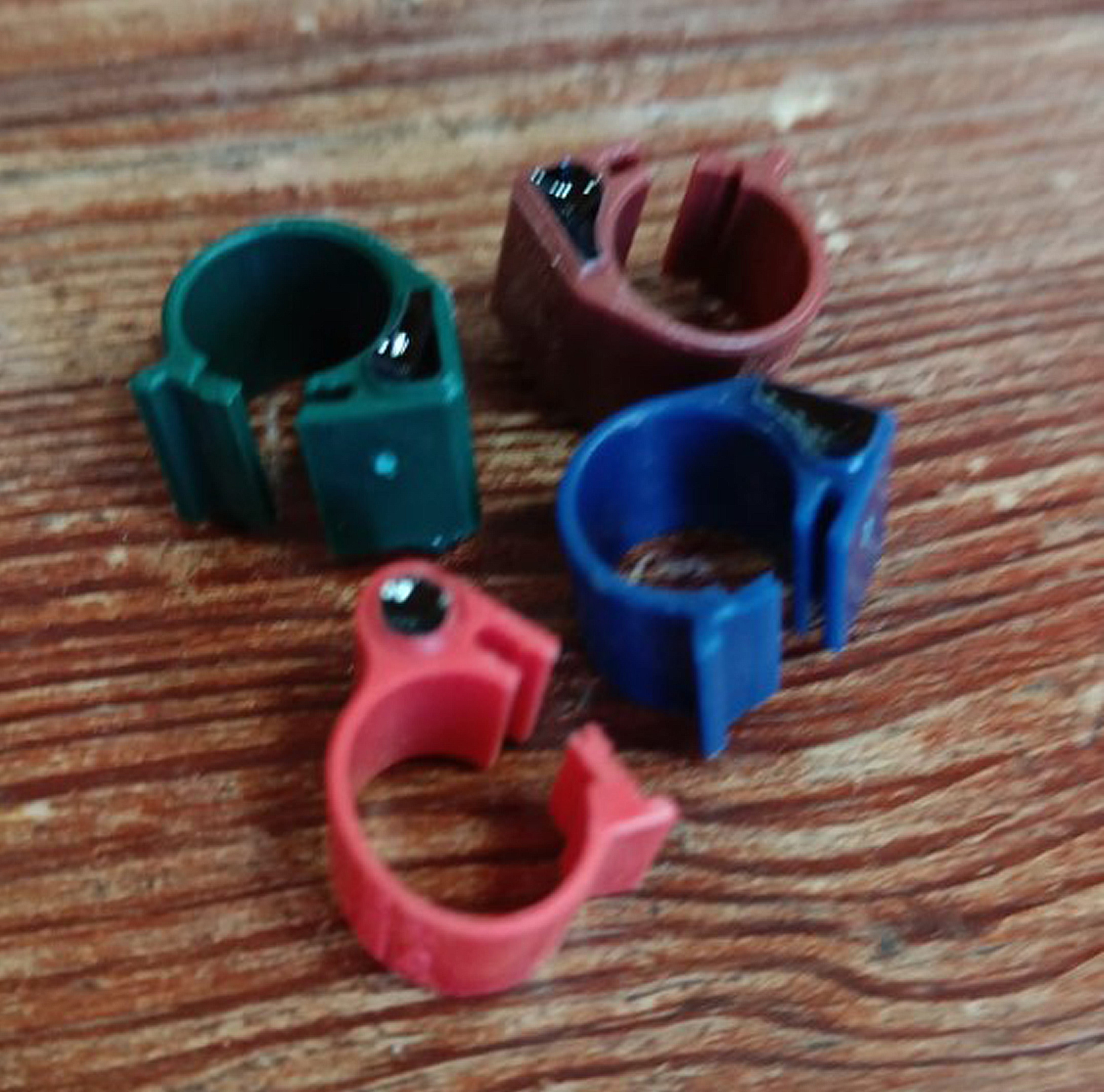
Pigeons' rings with RFID tags

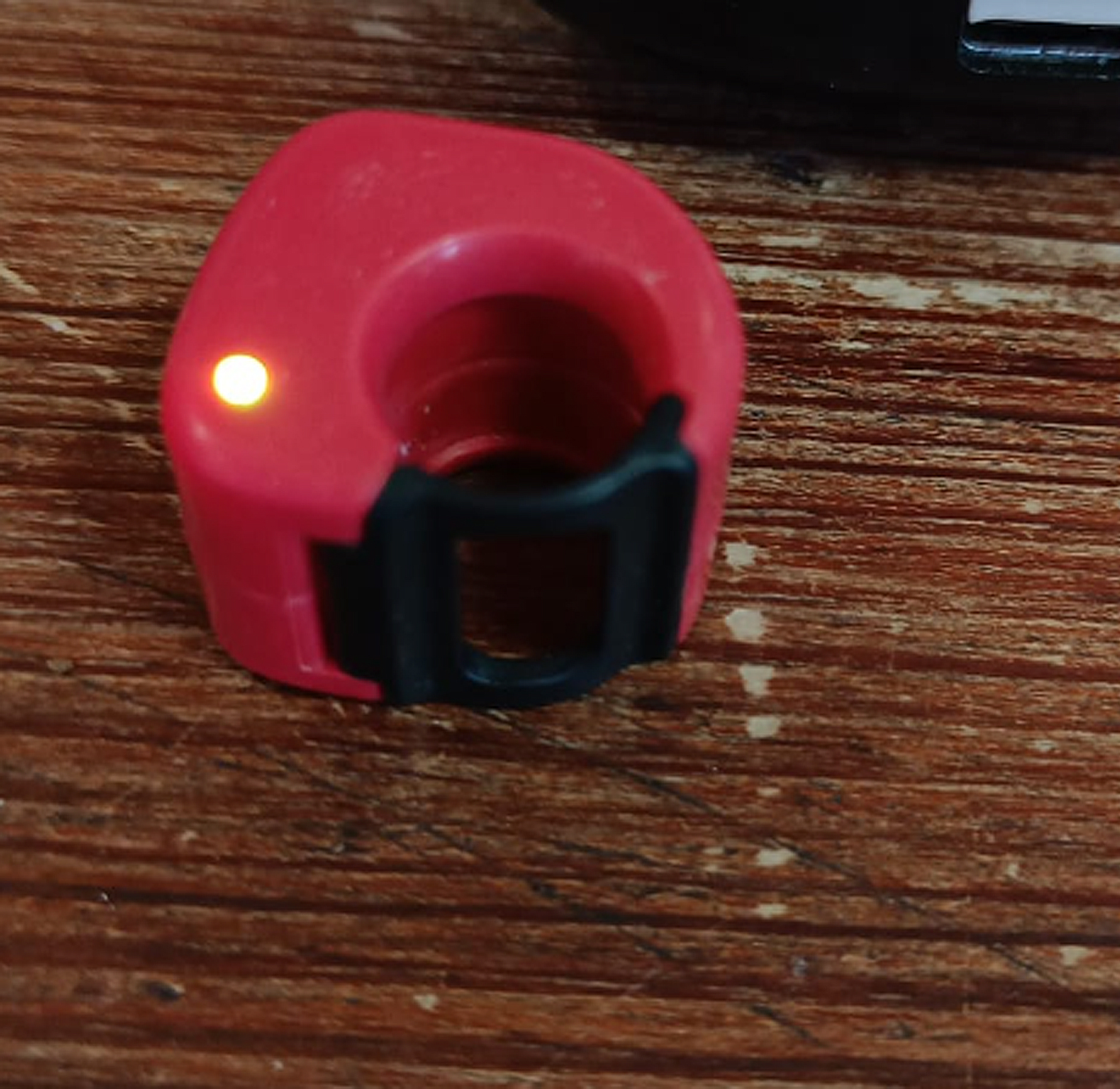
Pigeons' rings with active GPS chip

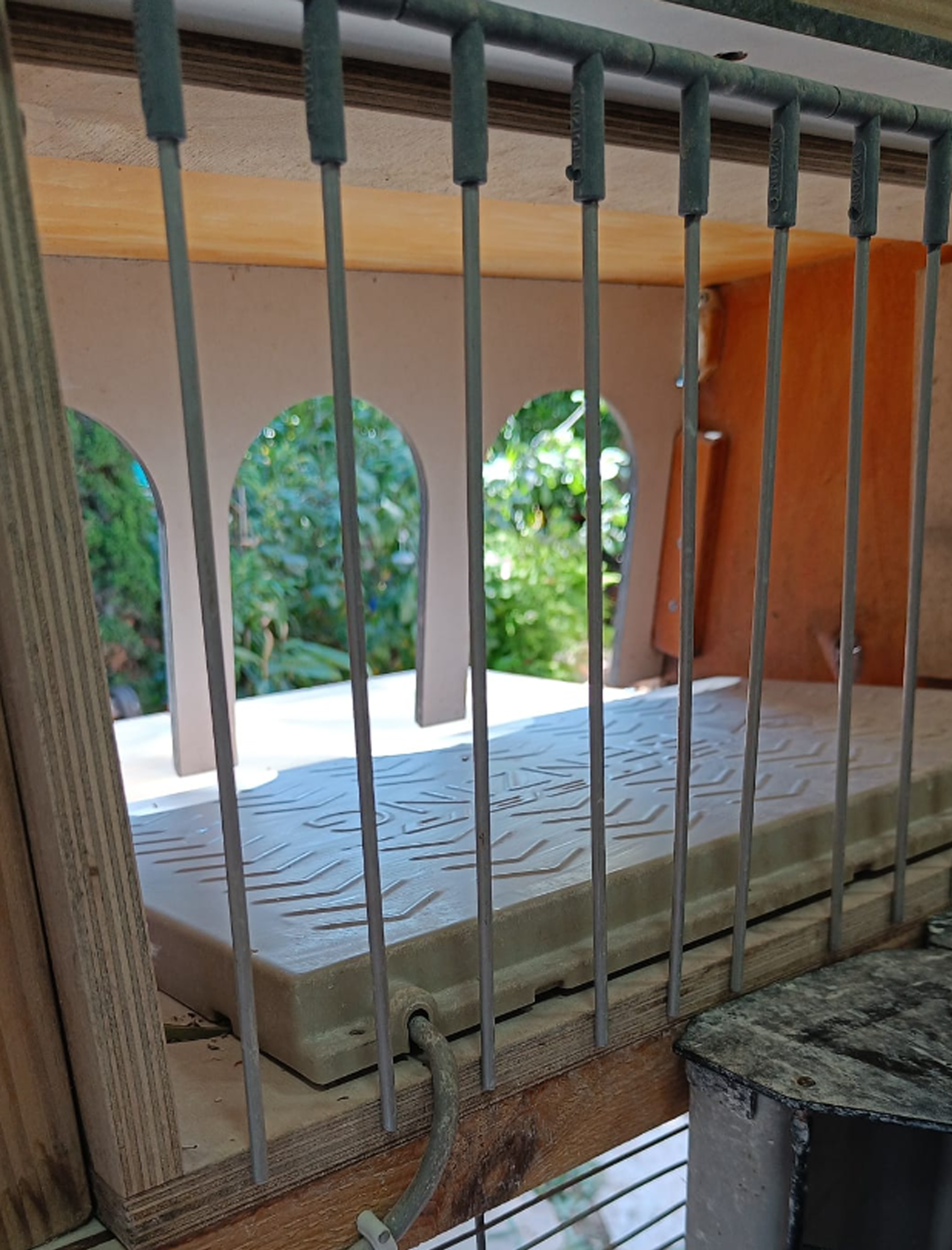
Antenna that scans the RFID tags at the entrance to the loft

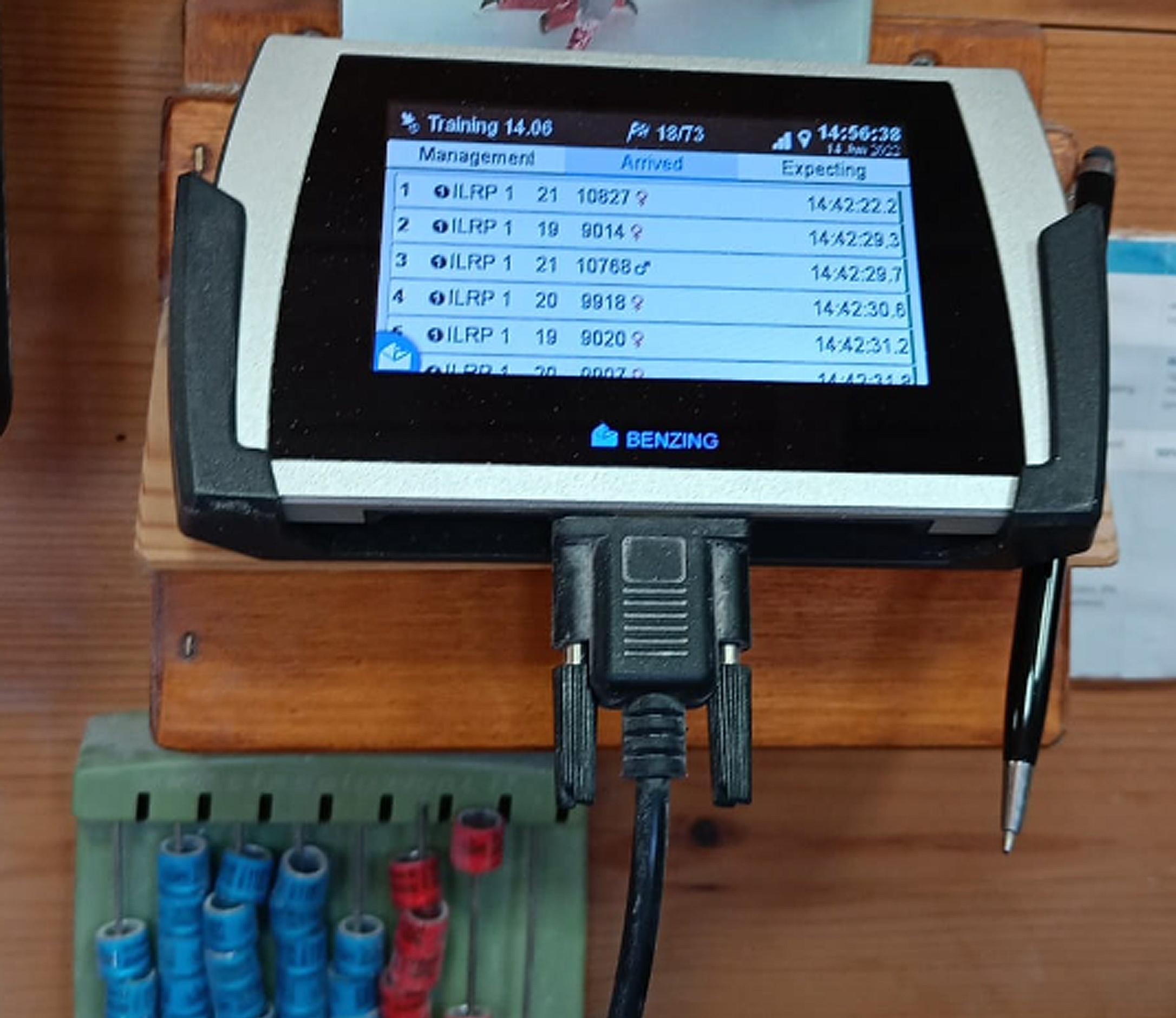
A system that displays the RFID tags data of pigeons returning from training

The latest development and preferred method for timing racing pigeons is the Electronic Timing System. The bird's arrival is recorded automatically. When using an electronic system, the pigeon fancier does not even have to be at the loft to clock the birds as they return. Birds are fitted with a band that has a tiny RFID chip in it which can be read when the bird comes home. At the home loft, the electronic scanning records the pigeons' arrival. The pad or antenna is placed at the entry point to the loft entrance, and as the pigeon crosses it, the electronic band is scanned. The clock is attached to the antennas. The serial number of the transponder ring is recorded along with the time of arrival. This is very similar to transponder timing systems used in human races.

In February 2008, the members of the Penygraig Homing Society Racing Pigeon Club in Wales won an award to fund a new electronic timing device. The club was able to obtain the device thanks to funding from the All Wales award initiative. Club secretary John Williams said: "The electronic timer certainly makes it a lot easier for us".

In conjunction with this new way of registering a bird's arrival, loft management software packages have been developed in the last 10 years to help fanciers with record keeping, producing pigeon pedigrees, publishing race results or keeping track of treatment and vaccination records.

== One-loft racing ==
One-loft racing originated from local futurity races, in which the birds race home from the racing station to their homes, and also award prize money and bragging rights. Some pigeon handlers could be better than others when it comes to racing. Therefore, one-loft racing was created. One-loft racing is the process of training birds bred by many different breeders in the same loft, under the same trainer and in the same conditions (as opposed to trainer against trainer in their own lofts and usually with their own birds). It is thought to be the fairest method of proving which bloodline or breeder is best and usually provides the highest amount of prize money. Pigeons are recorded by electronic timing systems scanning the birds as they enter the home loft with winners decided by as little as 100th of a second. The birds are all taken to the same release point and they return to the same home loft, so the winner is the fastest bird to complete the journey from A to B. One-loft racing is now becoming very popular all around the world with fanciers able to compare their bloodlines on an equal basis against the best breeders.

== Training ==
Racing pigeons are housed together in a specially designed dovecote or loft. From about four weeks of age until the end of its racing career, the racing loft is the pigeon's home and is where it returns to on race day.

After 22 to 28 days in the nest (depending on the owner's preference), the young birds are removed and placed in a section of a large loft or in a smaller loft built for the purpose. After a few days of learning how to locate the water and eating by themselves, they are allowed to wander out of the loft and peck around in the garden. While doing this, they are constantly observing their surroundings and becoming familiar with them. At about age six to seven weeks, the birds will begin taking off, flying in very small circles around their loft and owner's house. As their confidence grows, they gradually wander farther and farther from home until they are out of sight and can remain so for as much as two hours before returning. When a few trainers fly their pigeons in the same area, these flying "batches" (as flocks of pigeons are called) can number in the thousands. It does not help them much in relation to finding their home from long distances away, a fundamental of pigeon racing. As confident flyers, the young pigeons are taken on progressively longer 'training tosses', driven a distance away from their home and released. This method of training is a way to condition the birds mentally and physically to prepare them for the races. This practice of loft flying and tossing continues throughout a pigeon's career to keep their homing instincts sharp.

One of the most popular training systems is widowhood. This system uses the birds' desire to reproduce as motivation to try to give the bird a sense of urgency on race day. The use of widowhood is usually begun by first allowing the racer to raise a baby in their nest box. After the baby is weaned, the hen is removed and the nest box is often closed off. From then on, the only time these birds are allowed to see their mate or enter the nest box is upon returning from training or a race. This conditioning is a key element in many racing programmes.

Due to advancements in technology, researchers have been able to use small GPS devices to track the flight paths that their birds follow.

== Hazards ==
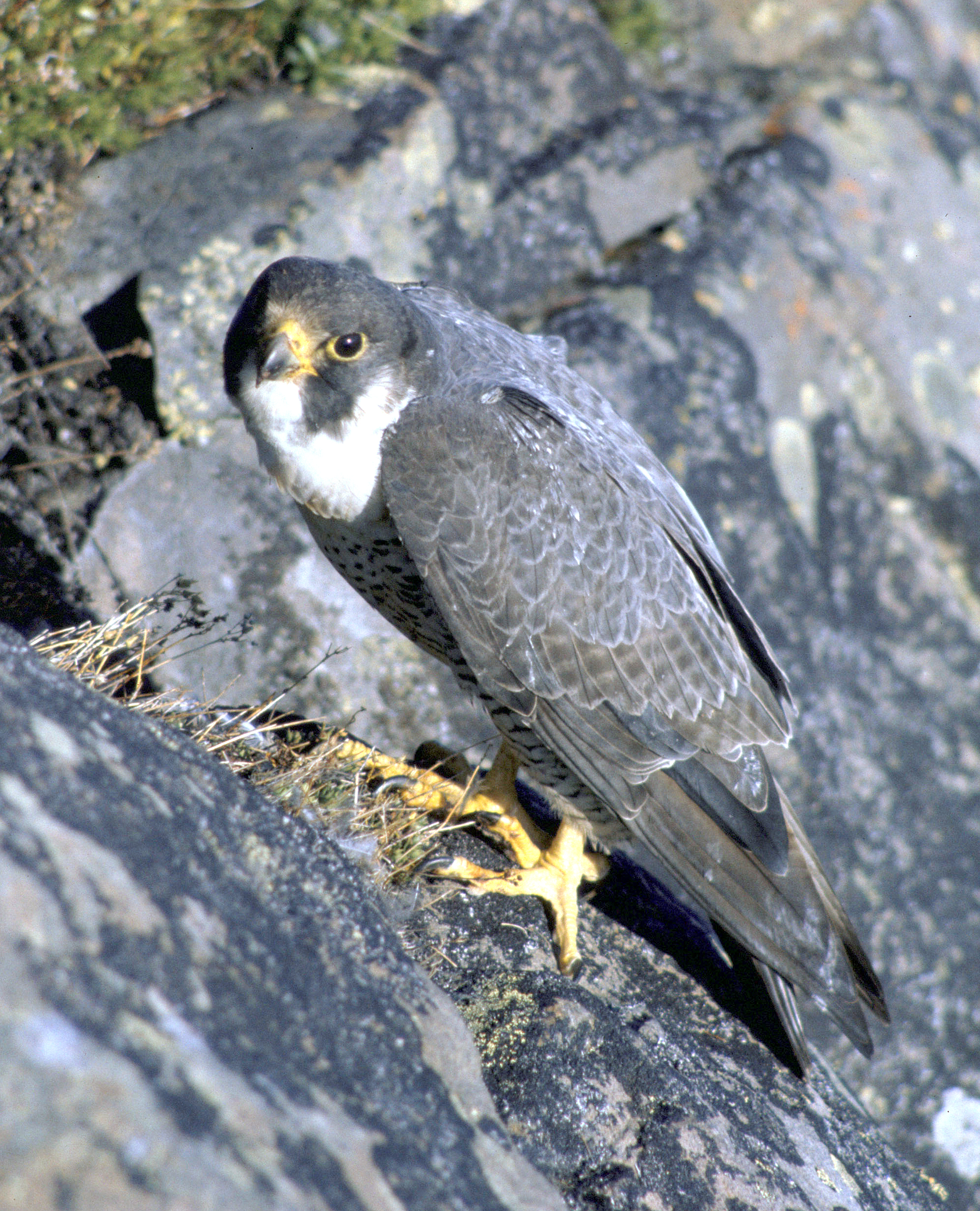
The peregrine falcon is a major predator of racing pigeons.

As pigeon racing takes place over great distances in the sky, many hazards could befall a pigeon during racing as well as training. The main hazard encountered by racing pigeons is predation by birds of prey. The killing of valuable pigeons by wild predators has led to some pigeon fanciers being suspected of and prosecuted for killing birds of prey such as falcons.

Another hazard that racing pigeons encounter is flying into objects they sometimes cannot see, mostly when traveling at high speeds or in darker weather conditions. The most common obstructions are electricity pylons or TV aerials. Pigeon fanciers will often have one of their pigeons return home with wounds or missing feathers from the belly or flanks.

It is thought that racing pigeons rely on the Earth's magnetic field to find their way home. Some speculation has surfaced indicating that mobile phone towers may be interrupting the birds' navigation, although no published research has investigated this theory.

== Breeding ==
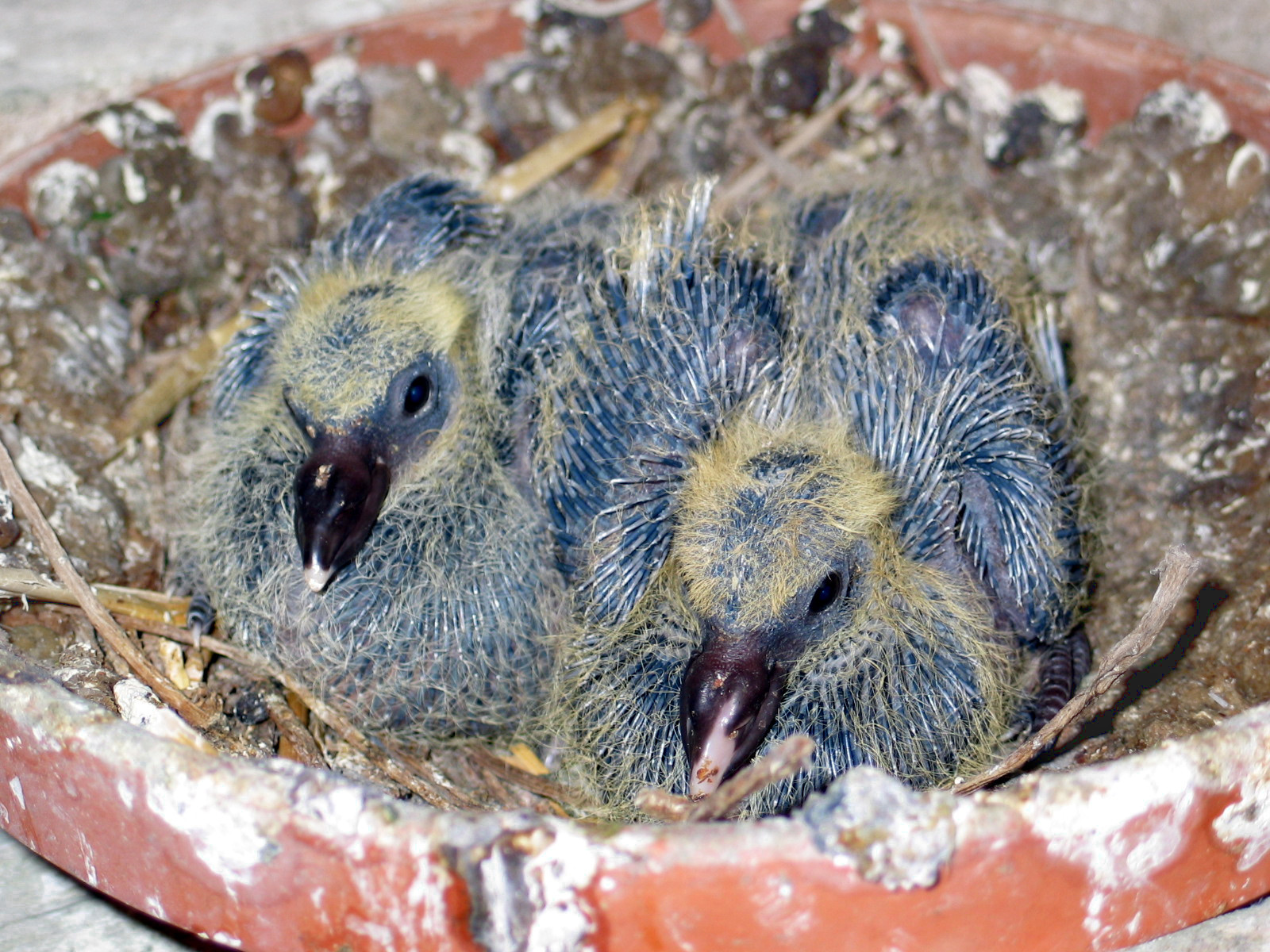
A pair of 9-day-old racing pigeons

Pigeons are sexually mature at about six months of age. Fanciers will often wait until the pigeon is at least a few months older before breeding. A hen bird will usually only lay two eggs in a clutch, laid every other day, after which incubation begins. The incubation period is 17 days. Pigeon breeders are careful in selecting birds to pair together so as to continue improving the breed and gain a competitive edge. It is this selective breeding that has given rise to the racing pigeons of today, capable of finding their way home from over 1,600 kilometres (990 mi) away and flying at speeds in excess of 130 kilometres per hour (81 mph) with a tail wind, but average 60 kilometres per hour (37 mph) on a calm day. Hens are often capable of laying upwards of 12 eggs per year, and squabs usually leave the nest at approximately three to four weeks of age.

== Doping ==
Doping in pigeon racing is the practice of giving performance-enhancing drugs to avian racers. The drugs are used to produce similar effects to those found in human athletes, building up muscle tissue and opening the respiratory tracts. In addition, corticosteroids can be used to delay molting, allowing a bird to race late into a season.

In October 2013, blood samples from twenty Belgian pigeons were sent by the Pigeon Fanciers Association to South Africa for testing. This was the result of an exchange visit by the association to the National Horseracing Authority of Southern Africa. While tests in Belgium had not found traces of any drugs, the South African laboratory discovered that six samples contained unusual substances. Five samples were found to include traces of acetaminophen (paracetamol), a widely used over-the-counter analgesic (pain reliever) and antipyretic (fever reducer). The sixth sample was erroneously reported in the press as having shown indications of cocaine use, but the lab reported that it was indications of caffeine usage. As the samples were sent anonymously, no action could be taken against the owners of any of the birds.

In 2001, a series of raids across 80 homes led to the confiscation of large quantities of illegal performance-enhancers. Currently, all race winners are tested and over 100 samples were collected and tested in 2013.

In 1995, the Belgian Ministry of Health mandated drug testing in order to protect the welfare of the birds. The sport's governing body was looking at the possibility of implementing new anti-doping rules for the sport prior to the commencement of the 2014 season.

== By region ==
=== The Americas ===
==== Brazil ====
The "Brazilian Pigeon Racing Grandprix" is the largest pigeon race in South America. The Sergipe's Pigeon Racing Association and the government from Aracaju organize this event.

==== Canada ====
The sport of pigeon racing has increased in Canada, with Pigeon Clubs and Ladies Auxiliary popping up in cities and towns. The CRPU, the Canadian Racing Pigeon Union, is an organization that is dedicated to the growth, preservation and support of pigeon racing in Canada.

The Canadian Pigeon International magazine is a monthly publication dedicated to the sport of pigeon racing.

==== United States ====
The sport was introduced into the United States about 1875, although regular racing did not begin until 1878. The sport of pigeon racing is well established in the US, and growing. According to the American Racing Pigeon Union, one of two large accrediting groups, there are 15,000 registered lofts in the US

The sport was banned beginning January 1, 2004, in Chicago, but there have been a number of attempts to amend the ban since then (by making exemptions to the ban for members of a national professional organization). Alderman Gilbert Villegas of the 36th ward introduced the newest legislation in June 2018, on behalf of the Polish constituents in his ward, saying the sport is deeply loved in Poland and a number of residents want to reintroduce the sport to Chicago.

Pigeon racing was popular throughout the 20th century in the New York City area, particularly in Brooklyn and the neighborhood of Coney Island, and in Hoboken, New Jersey, where it still has devotees.

=== Asia ===
Pigeon racing is becoming increasingly popular in parts of Asia, especially Indonesia, India, China, Pakistan, Iran, Philippines, Japan, Taiwan and Bangladesh. In Bangladesh, there are three pigeon racing associations that look after the sport and organize many races. There are thousands of registered pigeon fanciers in Bangladesh. Pakistan also has many pigeon clubs. Karachi, Peshawar, Lahore and Sargodha are leading in good quality racing pigeons. The heart of the sport in India is Chennai, the capital city of the state of Tamil Nadu.

==== Bangladesh ====
There are over 200 pigeon fanciers in Dhaka, Bangladesh, who race their pigeons outside Cumilla and Chittagong. These two cities have over 100,000 pigeons, with this number increasing day by day. Local people are also known to build their own lofts, with some being PIPA agents. These pigeons are directly bought.

==== The Philippines ====
Pigeon racing in the Philippines is well-established hobby and competitive sport with a strong following among pigeon fanciers, breeders and racing loft owners. Although commonly referred to as "Child's game or Larong Pambata" it is particularly interesting because it combines breeding, genetics, training, navigation, endurance, and competition.

The Philippines has a distinctive pigeon-racing environment because of its tropical climate, island geography, coastal routes, and long-distance races between provinces and regions. Unlike racing in other countries, racing in the Philippines encounter mountains, changing winds, unpredictable weather and crossing of substantial stretches of sea.

There are 2 traditional racing directions as follows:

North Derby Race: Races done from Northern Luzon locations as far as Sta Ana in Cagayan and Basco in Batanes Islands to the far north which is regarded as a special race in North Season.

South Derby Race: Races towards southern places. Particular famous race on this route is the MacArthur Race which is done every 3rd week of March approximately 600km from Manila. Other clubs such as those from Pangasinan 150km north of Manila which holds some of their races as far as Iloilo approximately 700km.

Important Philippine Regulations:

Pigeon Racing in the Philippines is regulated by the Bureau of Animal Industry (BAI). The bureau issued Memorandum Circular No. 38, Series of 2022, covering mandatory registration of pigeon racing clubs and requirements relating to avian influenza controls. Together with the Department on Agriculture, the agencies required registering clubs, veterinary health certifications and movement of racing pigeons. Checkpoints are placed on areas to verify current requirements on transporting birds to areas where they are released.

==== Taiwan ====
Taiwan has more racing pigeon events than any other country in the world, and can point to between two and three million birds. Nearly 500,000 people race pigeons on the island, and each year, prize money for races reaches the billions of New Taiwan dollars.

=== Oceania ===
==== Australia ====
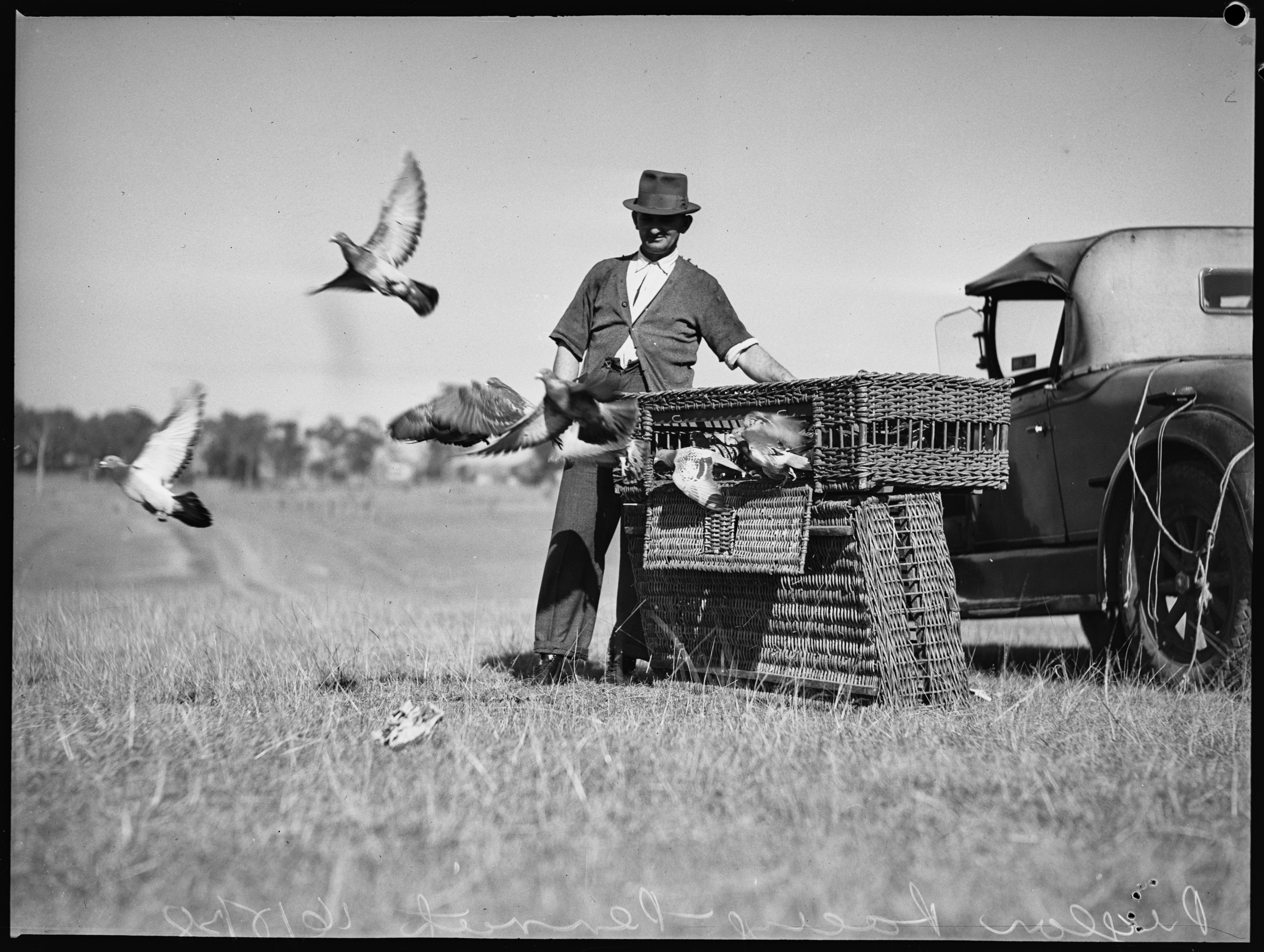
Pigeon racing, Australia, 1945

The largest racing organization in Australia is the Central Cumberland Federation. The state of Queensland also has a number of clubs and organizations. The largest of these is the Qld Racing Pigeon Federation Inc (QRPF). Located in Brisbane, the QRPF has a long history dating back to World War II. Each year, the QRPF organizes pigeon races for its 80-some members. These races start at approximately 145 kilometres (90 mi) in distance and continue on a gradual basis out to distances of over 1,000 kilometres (620 mi). A specialized transporter is used to transport the birds to the release points. This transporter enables the birds to be fed and watered en route before mass release at a predetermined time for their flight back to various home lofts. Many thousands of pigeons compete in races each weekend during the winter months.

Pigeon racing has been declining around Sydney, with club members gradually dying off as fewer younger people take up the sport. The high cost of feeds and fuel has also contributed to the decline.

=== Europe ===
==== Belgium ====
The Janssen brothers (Louis, Charel, Arjaan and Sjef) were a famous and successful pigeon racing family from Arendonk. Louis Janssen, born 1912, was the last-surviving of the famous brothers. He died on April 16, 2013, at the age of 100. Descendants of the brothers' pigeons can be found racing all around the world.

Another famous and successful pigeon fancier is Karel Meulemans. Karel, born in Retie, also lives in Arendonk.

==== Poland ====
Pigeon racing in Poland is overseen by Polski Związek Hodowców Gołębi Pocztowych (the Polish Association of Mail Pigeon Breeders), which has over 40,000 members. The first local association of pigeon breeders in the Polish lands under occupation was established in 1905 in Zabrze. After Poland regained independence in 1918, several such organizations were established, and in 1926, the first nationwide breeders' association was established: Zjednoczenie Polskich Stowarzyszeń Hodowców Gołębi Pocztowych na Rzeczpospolita Polska (Unification of Polish Mail Pigeon Breeders' Associations for the Republic of Poland). The breeding of racing pigeons was banned during the Nazi occupation, but after World War II, the Polish Pigeon Breeders Union was recreated on April 1, 1946, in Kraków.

==== Turkey ====
The sport is popular in Turkey. In May 2008, a nine part, 1,150 kilometres (710 mi) pigeon race from the town of Manisa to Erzurum was organized with participants from many pigeon associations across the country.

==== UK and Ireland ====
The first regular race in Great Britain was in 1881. The British Royal Family first became involved with pigeon racing in 1886 when King Leopold II of Belgium gave them breeding stock. The tradition continued until recently, and a bird of Queen Elizabeth II won a race in 1990. King Charles III recently withdrew from patronage of the sport's governing body. The sport is declining in the UK, with membership of recognized clubs and federations falling by about five percent annually.

The National Flying Club is a British pigeon racing club, and open to anyone in England and Wales.

In the United Kingdom and Ireland, pigeon racing is regulated by six independent organizations:

- Irish Homing Union (IHU)
- North of England Homing Union (NEHU)
- North West Homing Union (NWHU)
- Royal Pigeon Racing Association (RPRA)
- Scottish Homing Union (SHU)
- Welsh Homing Union (WPHU)

In 2007, the British Parliament banned pigeons racing from continental Europe to Britain because of the risk of bird flu. A British MEP supported fanciers to have the ban lifted. Labour MEP Brian Simpson, from Golborne, believed that it was unfair to allow concerns about avian flu to throttle the fanciers' sport. Simpson said, "But what is clearly apparent now is that pigeon are low-risk in regards to avian flu and the decision to ban continental pigeon racing was wrong."

Apart from the sport of racing against each other, fanciers also exhibit racing pigeons at organized shows and have a judge decide who has the better bird. British Homing World holds a show each year. All profits from the event are donated to both national and local charities, including Help the Aged and the Association for Spina Bifida and Hydrocephalus.

=== Africa ===
==== South Africa ====
South Africa is the home of the richest one-loft race in the world, the Million Dollar Pigeon Race. The Million Dollar Pigeon Race involves 4,300 birds from 25 countries with a prize fund of $1.3 million. The runners-up win cars and smaller monetary prizes, while the overall winner receiving $200,000. Sun City's one-loft race, sees birds from across the world air-freighted to South Africa as squabs, months before the race, and trained to orient to a single loft. On race day, after being released 550 kilometres (340 mi) out on the South African veldt, the birds all race back to the same destination. The first race was in 1996 and attracted 893 pigeons. The race broke even after five years.

In February 2008, a pigeon fancier paid a South African record R 800,000 for a racing pigeon at auction. The auction was held after the Sun City Million Dollar Pigeon Race.

== See also ==
- Cher Ami – Homing pigeon used by the U.S. Army Signal Corps
- Pigeon sport – Sports involving the use of piegons as competitors
- Release dove – Dove bred for release at an event
- Pigeon racing at the 1900 Summer Olympics
- Up North Combine – Pigeon racing association in England
