= Saint pigeon =

Breed of pigeon

Saint
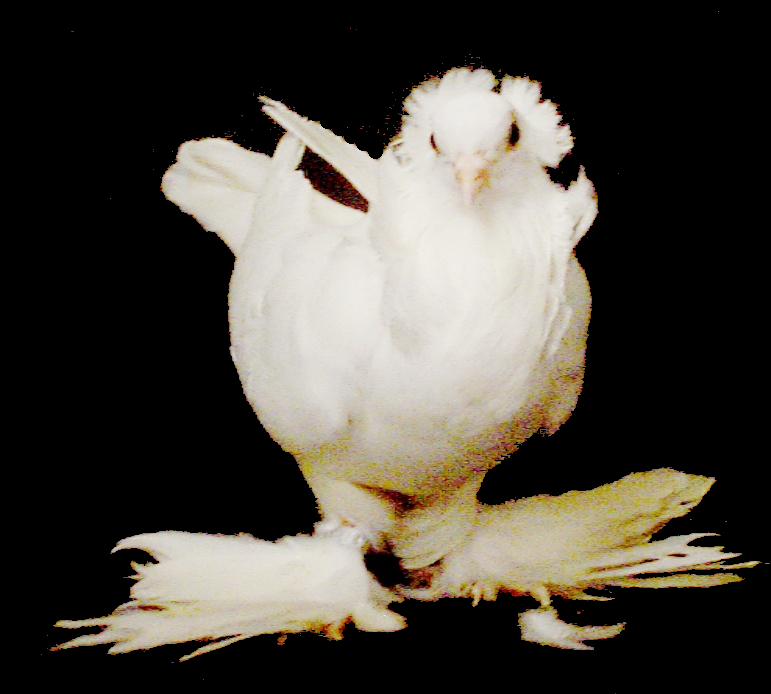
- White Saint Pigeon
- Conservation status: Rare
- Country of origin: United States

Traits
- Crest type: large wrap around entire head and on breast
- Feather ornamentation: foot feathering

Classification
- Australian Breed Group: not listed
- US Breed Group: rare
- EE Breed Group: not listed

The Saint pigeon is a breed of fancy pigeon, developed by H.P. Macklin using selective breeding. Breeds used in the development of the Saint included the Mane (Schmalkaldener Mohrenkopfs), Moorhead, and the Jacobin

== Characteristics ==
The Saint is known for its unusual and prolific feather ornamentation, its white pearl eyes, and its upright stance. The shell crest is large, curving around the head, and extending onto the neck. The legs are covered with feathers of about an inch in length extending onto the toes.

While it was originally developed as pure white, it is now seen in varied colored splashes or tigered.

== History ==
This breed's beginnings are well known. H.P. Macklin started developing this breed from the Main, Moorhead and Jacobin in the late 1950s through the early 1960s, reporting on his early work in the American Pigeon Journal in the May issue of 1963. The name was derived from the city of its creation, Saint Louis. A breeding standard was developed for the breed to guide further development. Macklin introduced feather curling into the breed using Frillbacks as the cross, but this feather feature is rarely, if ever, seen today.

=== Status ===
The breed did have a club supporting the breed's development, but it is no longer in existence. The Rare Breeds Pigeon Club now supports this variety, along with other rare breeds.

== Gallery ==
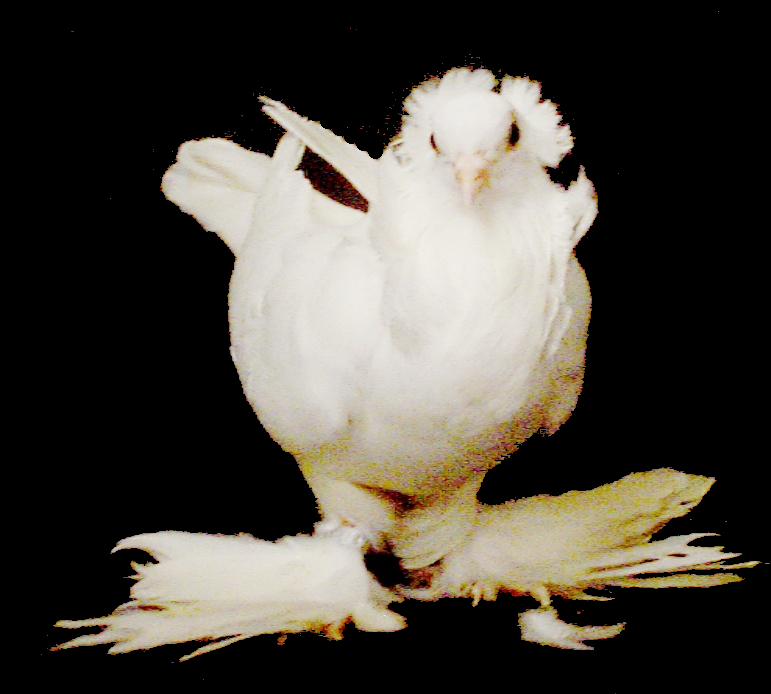
Saint pigeon

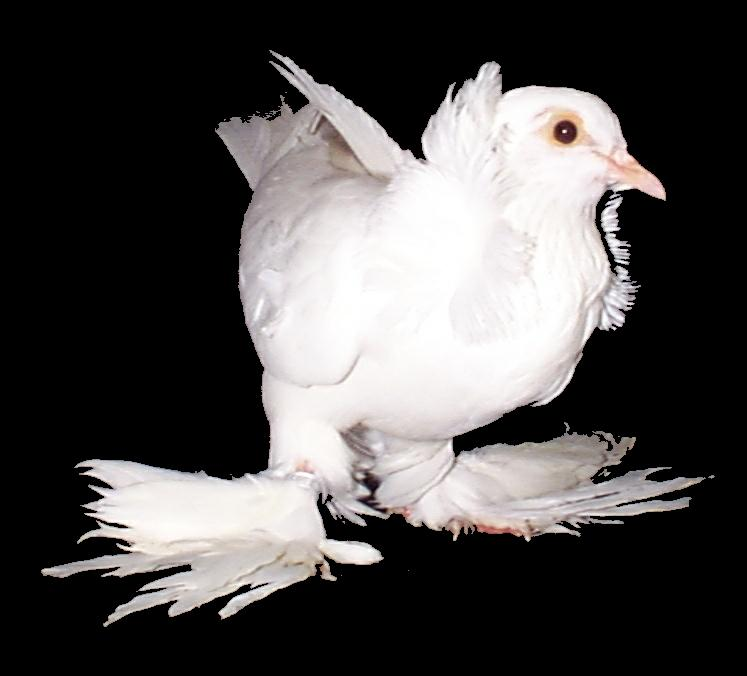
Saint Pigeon Young Hen

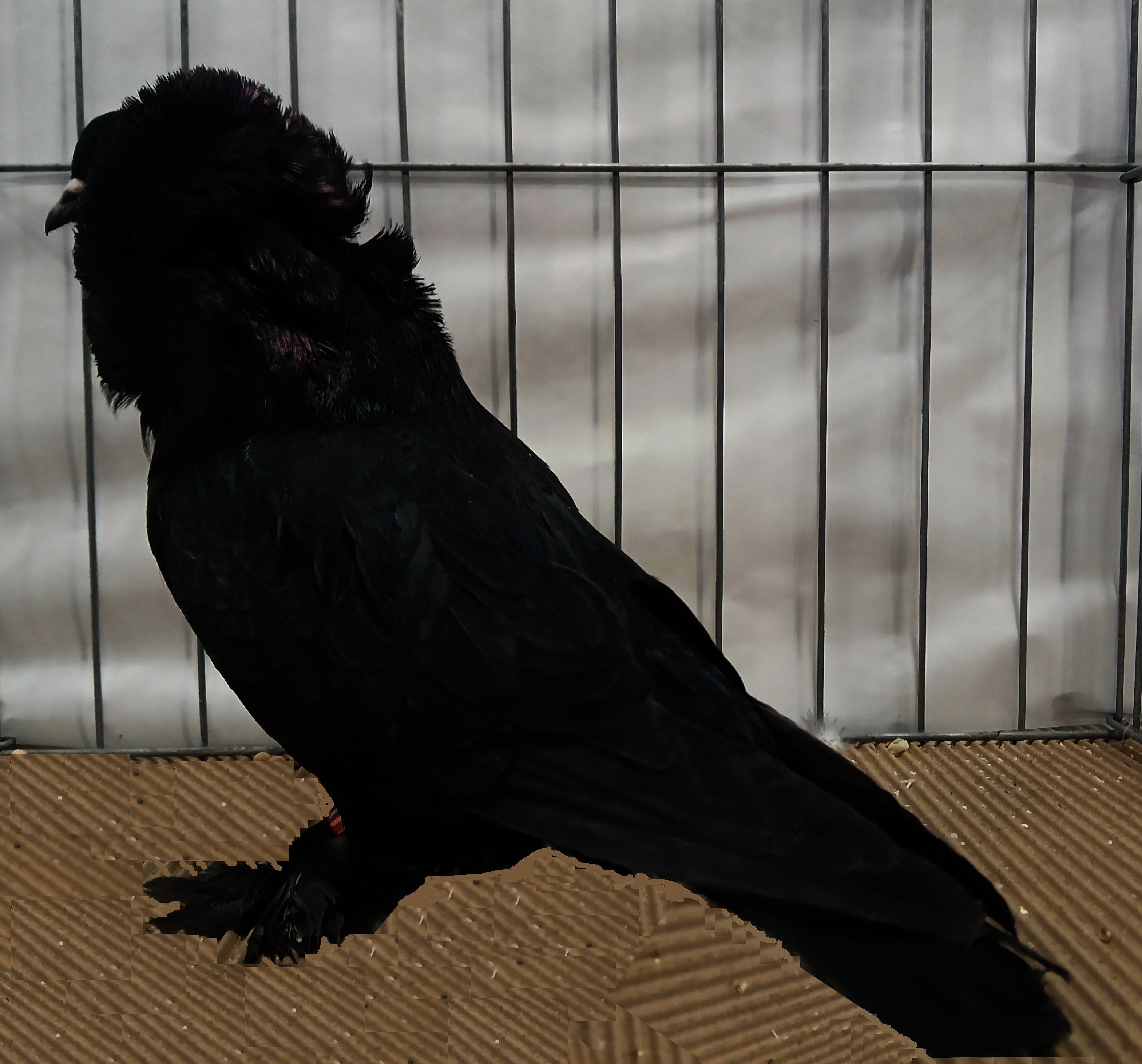
Black NPA show 2026

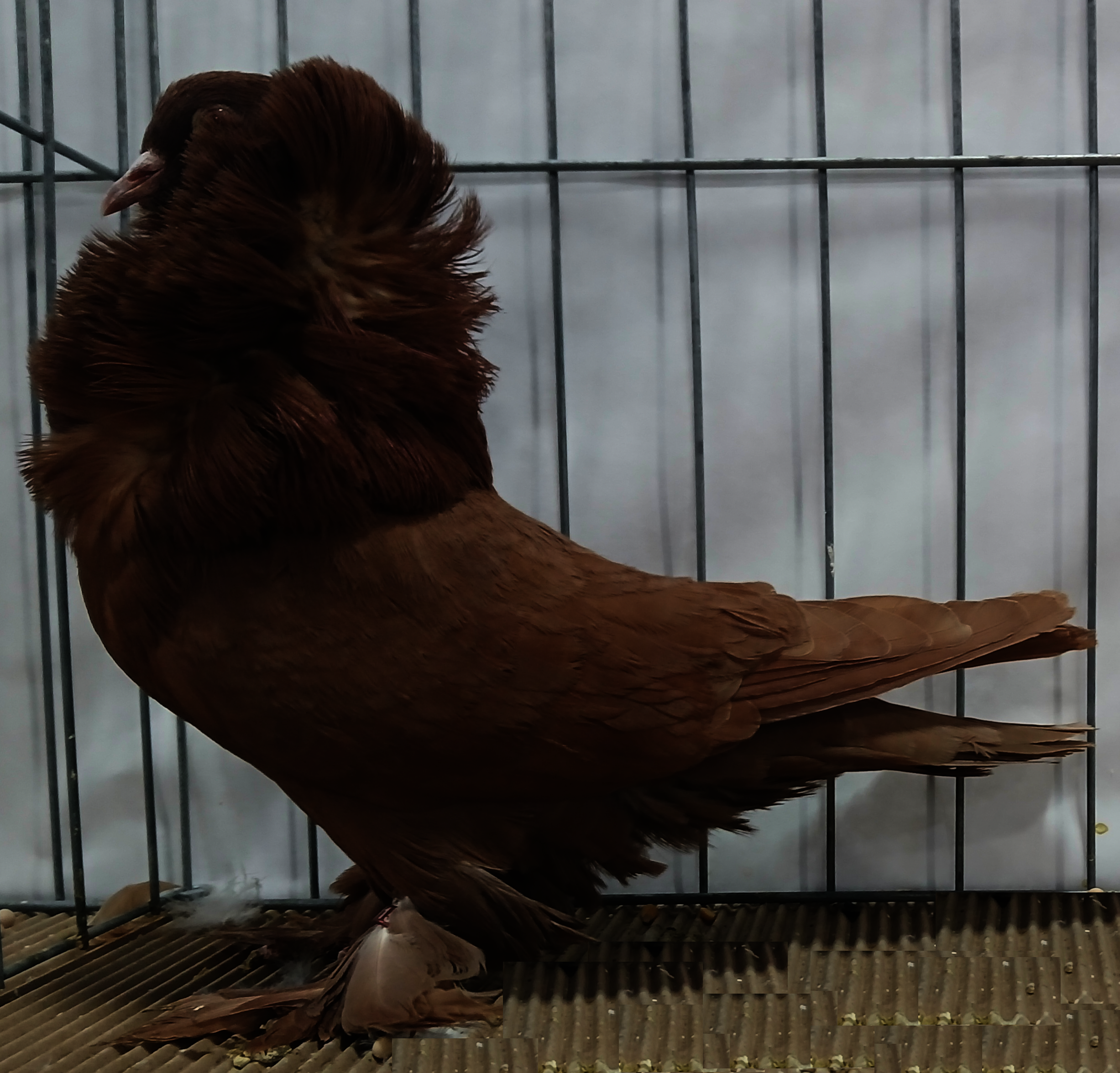
Red NPA show 2026

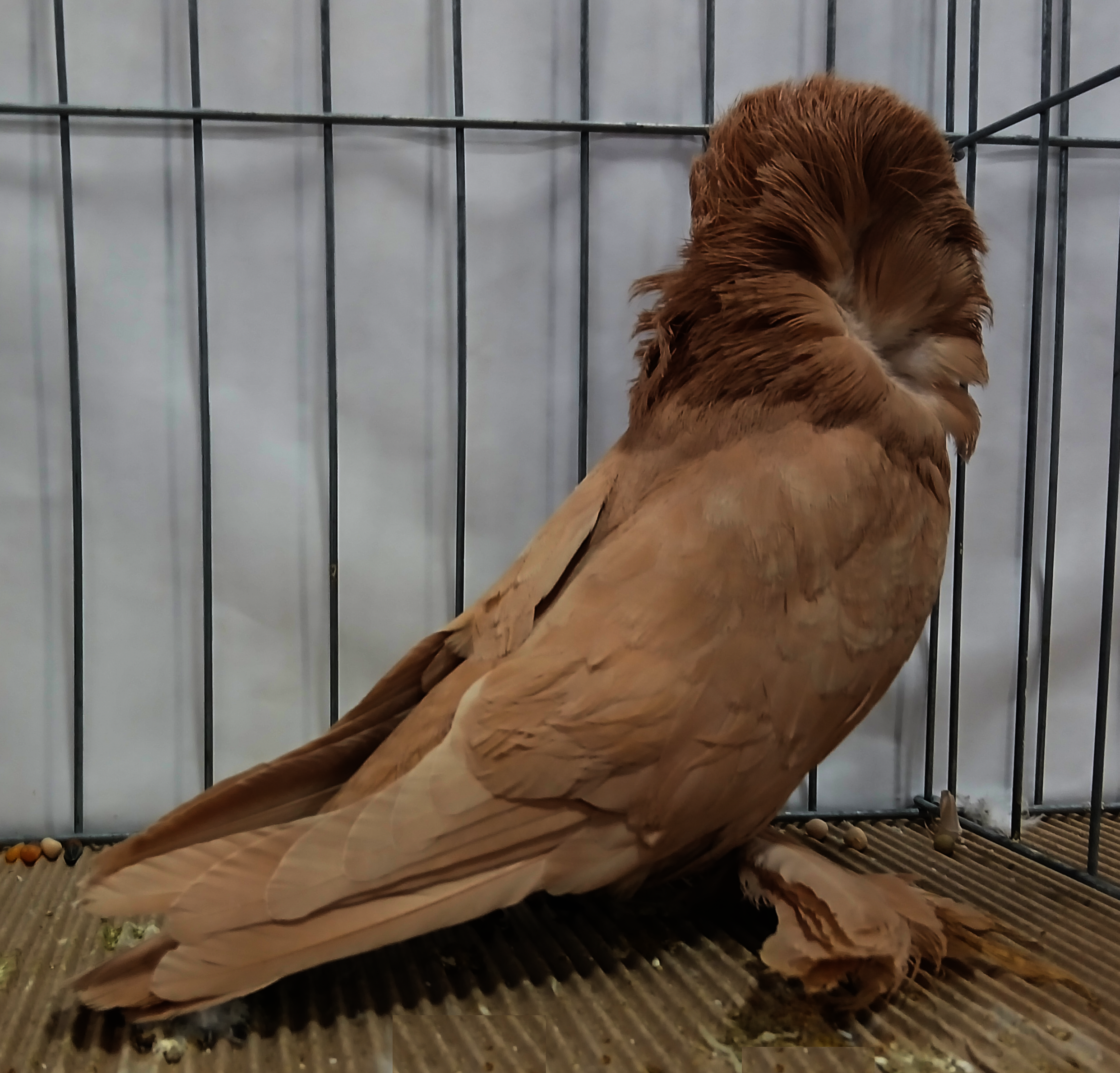
Yellow NPA show 2026

== See also ==
- List of pigeon breeds
- Pigeon keeping
  - Pigeon Diet
  - Pigeon Housing

- Media related to Saint pigeon at Wikimedia Commons
