= Bijeljina Roller =

Breed of pigeon

The Bijeljina Roller is a breed of fancy pigeon. Bijeljina Rollers, along with other varieties of domesticated pigeons, are all descendants from the rock pigeon (Columba livia).

== See also ==
- List of pigeon breeds
