= South German Monk =

Breed of pigeon

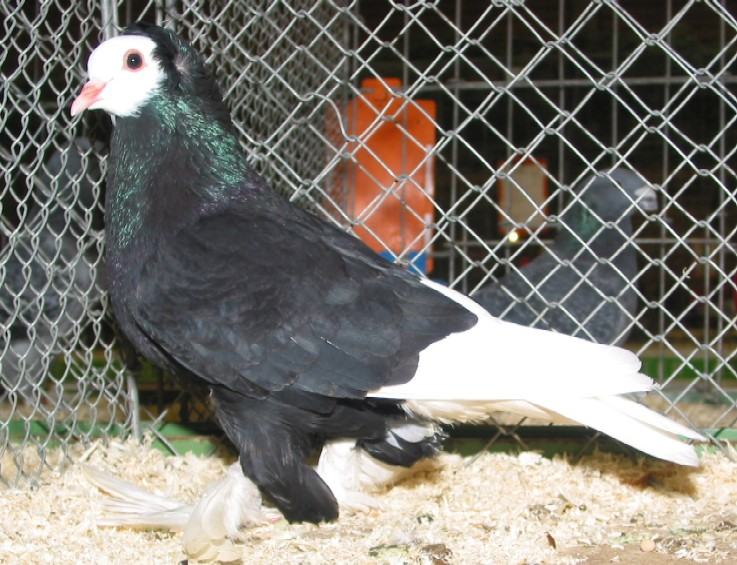
South German Monk

The South German Monk is a breed of fancy pigeon developed over many years of selective breeding. South German Monks, along with other varieties of domesticated pigeons, are all descendants from the rock pigeon (Columba livia). The South German Monk is always peak crested and clean legged or shell crested with medium length muffs blending with the hock feathers.

== See also ==
- List of pigeon breeds
