= Debrecin Roller =

Breed of pigeon

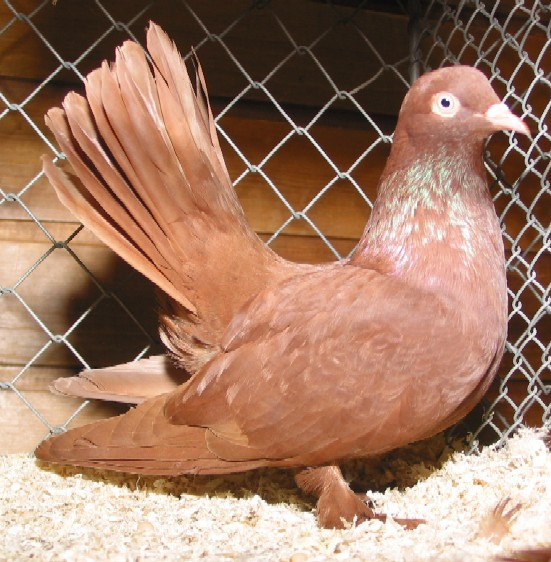
Debreciner Roller

The Debrecin Roller is a breed of fancy pigeon. Debreciner Rollers, along with other varieties of domesticated pigeons, are all descendants from the rock pigeon (Columba livia).

== See also ==
- List of pigeon breeds
