= Giant American Crest =

Breed of pigeon

American Crest
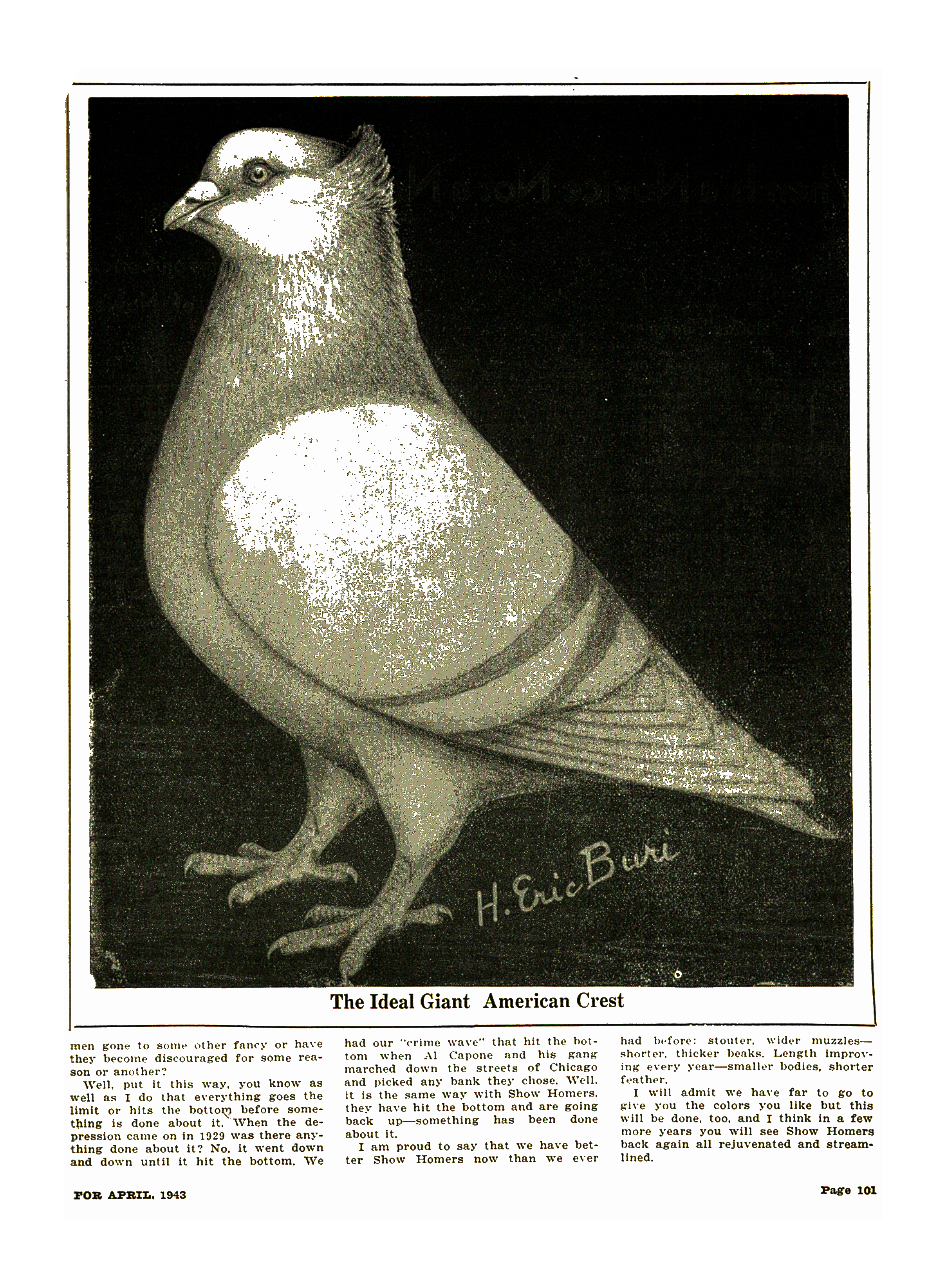
- Other names: Giant American Crest
- Country of origin: United States

Traits
- Crest type: Shell Peak

Classification
- Australian Breed Group: not listed
- US Breed Group: Utility/Form
- EE Breed Group: not listed

Notes
- The Giant American Crest, shares the standard with the American Miniature Crest except for size

The Giant American Crest, a breed of pigeon, was developed in the United States with selective breeding It is primarily considered a form or utility breed. The American Crest has two varietals. The larger is known as Giant American Crest, and the smaller American Miniature Crest. Along with all other varieties of domesticated pigeons, this breed is a descendant of the rock dove (Columba livia).

== Characteristics ==
The American Giant Crest is a very large pigeon, weighing nearly two pounds. The Miniature Crest is identical except for size, weighing only one pound. The breast is very large, broad and deep. The head and neck are held back, giving the bird a proud over towering look. The flesh bulges out on both sides of the keel, making the breast wider than the length of the body. The wings are held high, folded tightly, and are rather short, not extending far beyond the body. The short tail helps to give an even broader overall appearance. The legs are set wide apart, and are rather short, chubby, and tightly feathered. The crest is neither a peak nor a shell crest but is about halfway in between. When placing a finger on the bird's skull the crest feathers will snugly curl up and around it. In spite of their large size, this is a docile, friendly breed. They are just the right size to be easy to handle without fear of hurting them, making them a perfect bird pet.

Their coloring includes Blue, Black, Brown, Ash red, Recessive red and yellow, Silver, Almond, White, Grizzle and Splash.

== History ==
The Giant American Crest is new to the list of pigeon breeds. In the early 1930s, a small group of breeders in the United States started to develop the breed that would come to be called The Giant American Crest. They formed a club to promote the development and name of the Giant American Crest. Herman Eric Buri became known as the “father” of the club, and consequently of the breed. The Mondain and Sottobauca and were used in the creation of the breed The National Pigeon Association recognized the Giant American Crest during the National Pigeon Association's convention in Philadelphia in January 1940, adopting the name and standard of perfection concurrently.

== Status ==
The Rare Breeds Club is the sponsor for this breed in the United States, classifying the Giant variety as a Utility type, and the Miniature variety as a Form type. They have been exhibited at most NPA (National Pigeon Association) shows since 1940, as well as at other major shows throughout the United States. They are not a listed breed outside of the United States.

== Basic needs ==
Pigeons are fed either a raw whole grain or a pellet mix designed specifically for pigeons. There are mixes on the market designed specifically for pigeons. Inorganic materials are also needed in their diets, including salts, minerals, and calcium. Mixes made specifically for pigeons are readily available, called pigeon grit. Clean water is naturally also required. Pigeons suck water to drink, as you do with a straw. A container with at least one inch or more of free standing water is perfect.

== See also ==
- List of pigeon breeds
