= Seraphim (pigeon) =

Pigeon breed

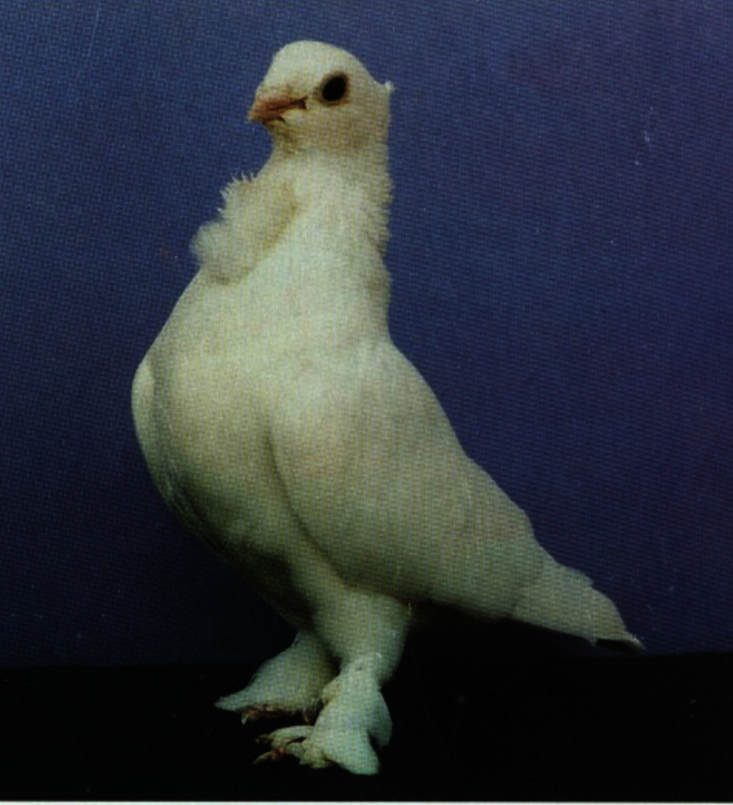
- Conservation status: Common
- Other names: none
- Nicknames: Elli's Angel
- Country of origin: United States

Traits
- Crest type: Swoop with needle point peak
- Feather ornamentation: Jabot (chest frill) and grouse foot feathering

Classification
- Australian Breed Group: not listed
- US Breed Group: Rare, Owls/Frills
- EE Breed Group: not listed

Notes
- Shows red, mostly on the wings, when young. After first molt - pure white

Seraphim are a breed of pigeon developed in the United States with selective breeding. (The name "Seraphim" is plural; a single bird is called a "Seraph.") They are considered a fancy rare breed. Seraphim and the other varieties of domesticated pigeon are descendants of the rock dove (Columba livia).

== Characteristics ==
The breed is known for its unusual color change as it matures. When young, it is white with red or yellow showing on the wing shields and tail in a Satinette pattern. At the first molt, it becomes pure white. The eyes are dark brown, not showing any signs of the pupil, which is called bull eyed.

=== Colors ===
Pure white after first molt.

== History ==
Anne Ellis began developing the breed in 1986 using Old Fashioned (Classic) Oriental Frills. All Seraphim are genetically recessive red or recessive yellow with a Whitesides and Tail-Whitening trait. They molt to pure white in their first year and have a frill, a peak crest, a mane, and slipper‑like grouse feet. Like all fancy pigeons in the Owl/Frill family, the beak is small and short.

== Status ==
The National Pigeon Association (NPA) recognized Seraphim in 1995. They have been exhibited at many sanctioned National Pigeon Association shows since, as well as other major shows throughout the United States.

== Diet ==
Pigeons are fed either a raw whole grain or a pellet mix designed specifically for pigeons. There are mixes on the market designed specifically for pigeons. Inorganic materials are also needed in their diets, including salts, minerals, and calcium. Mixes made specifically for pigeons are readily available, called pigeon grit. Clean water is naturally also required. Pigeons suck water to drink, as you do with a straw. A container with at least one inch or more of free standing water is perfect.

== Gallery ==
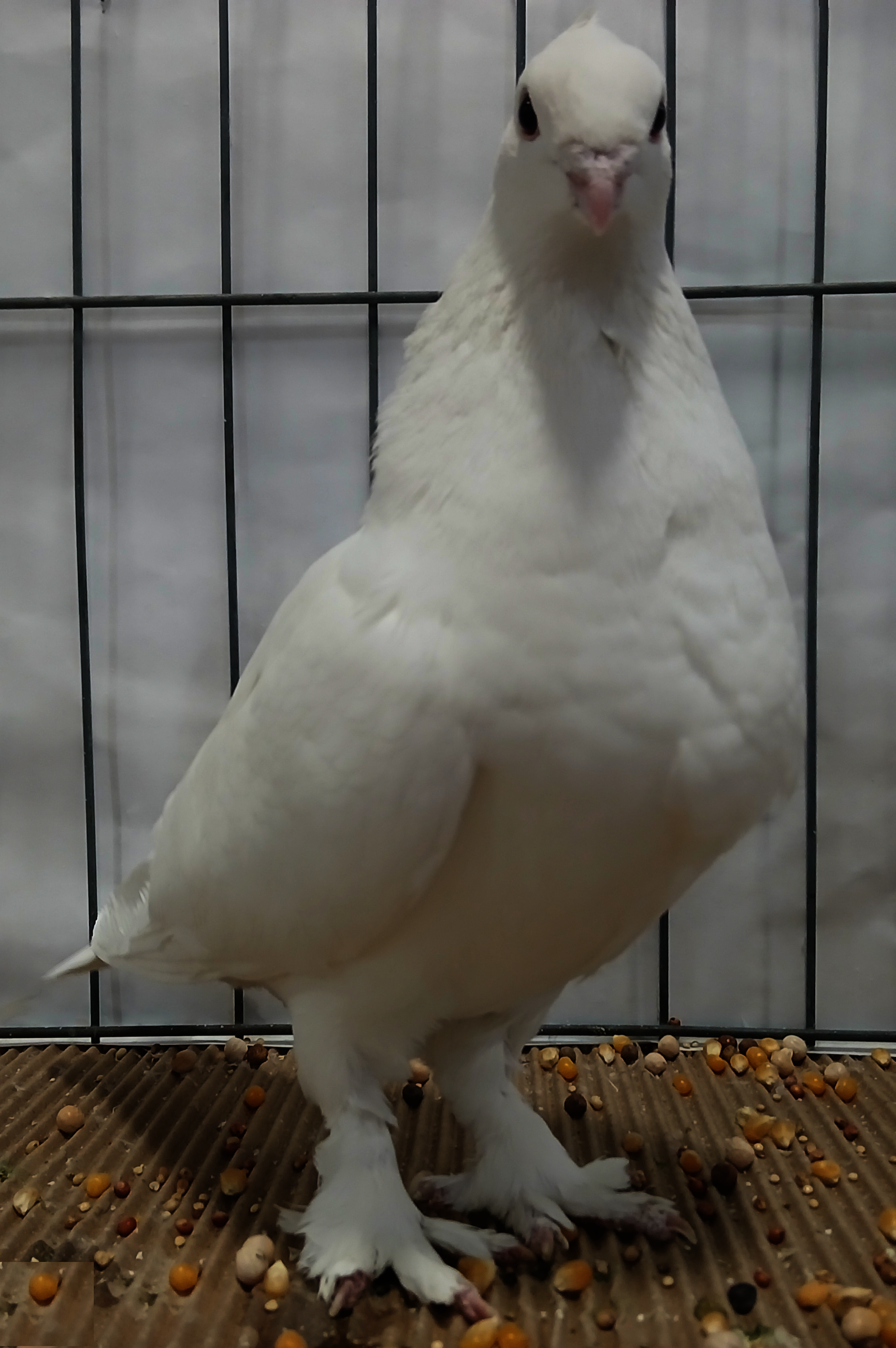
NPA show 2026

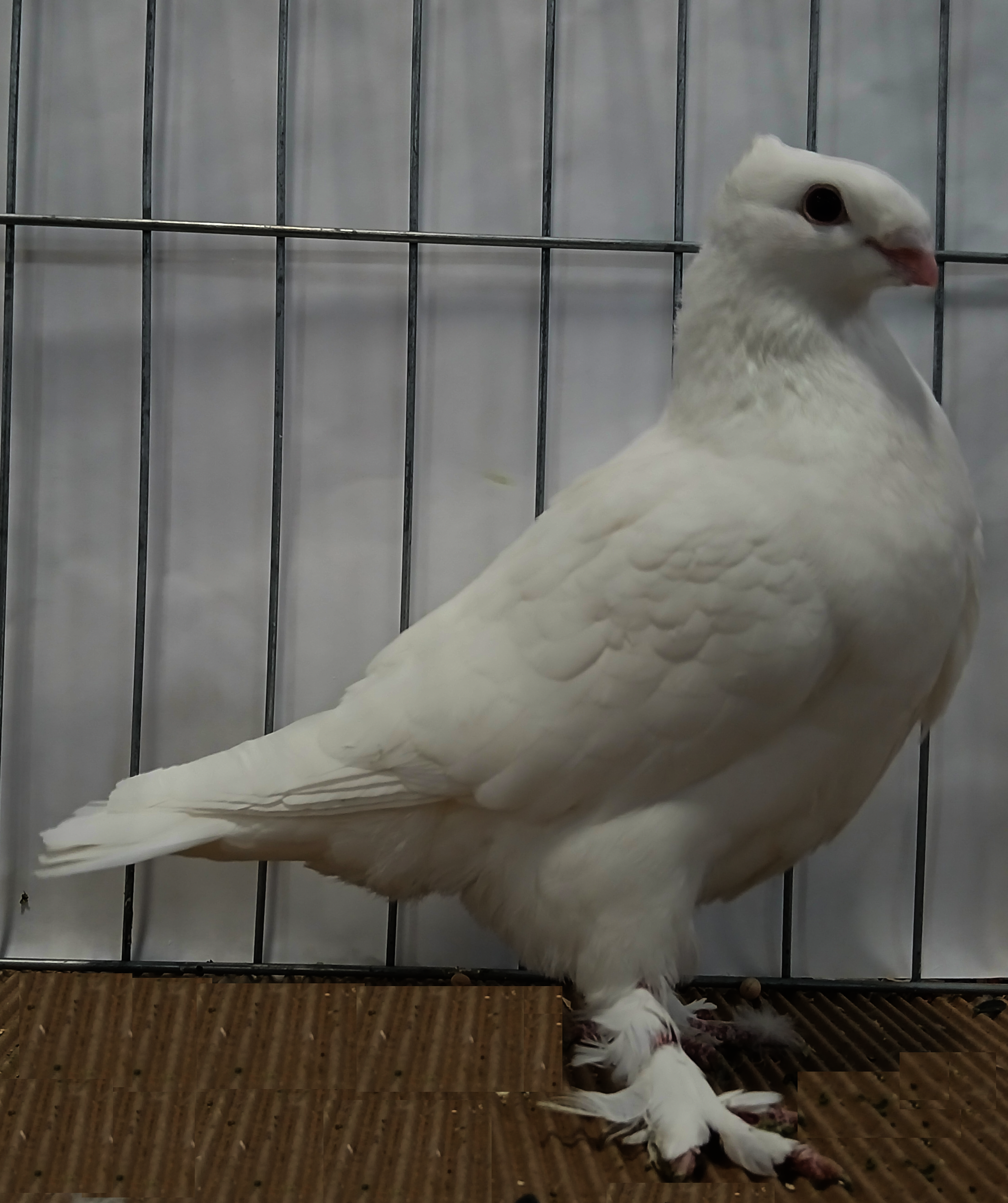
NPA show 2026

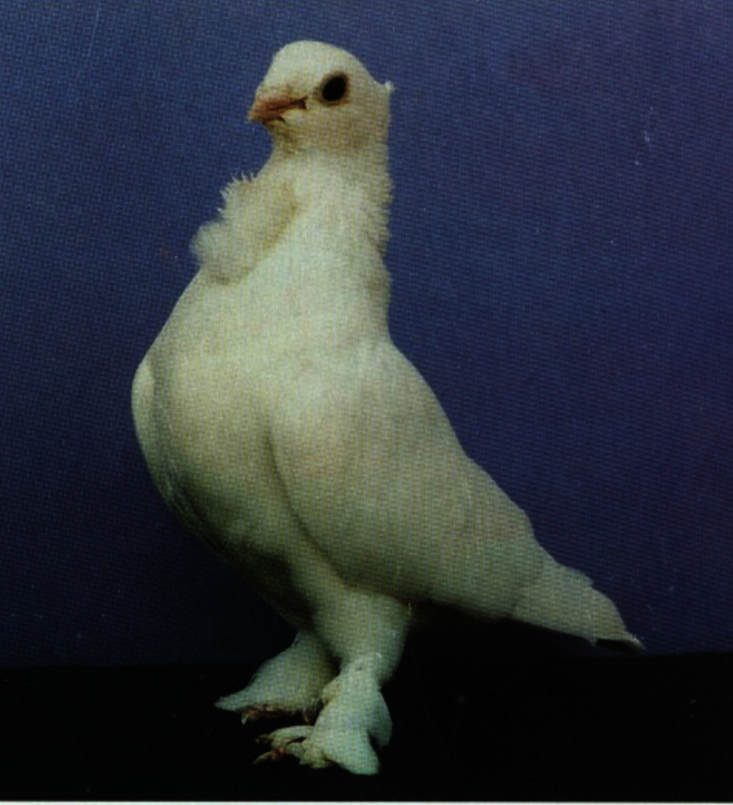
Shown at Puget Sound Classic 1998

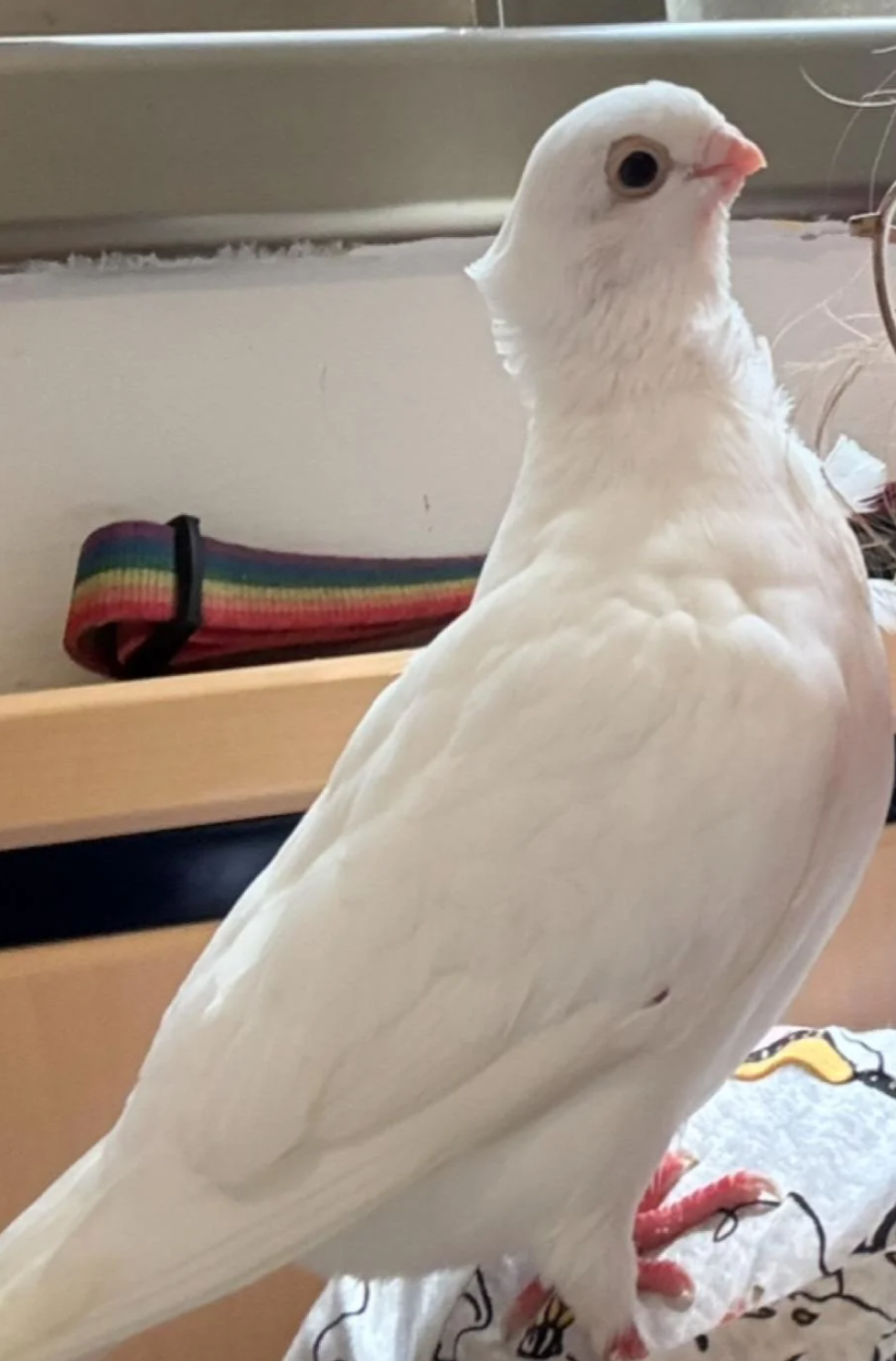
Junpei

== See also ==
- List of pigeon breeds
