= Turbiteen =

Breed of pigeon

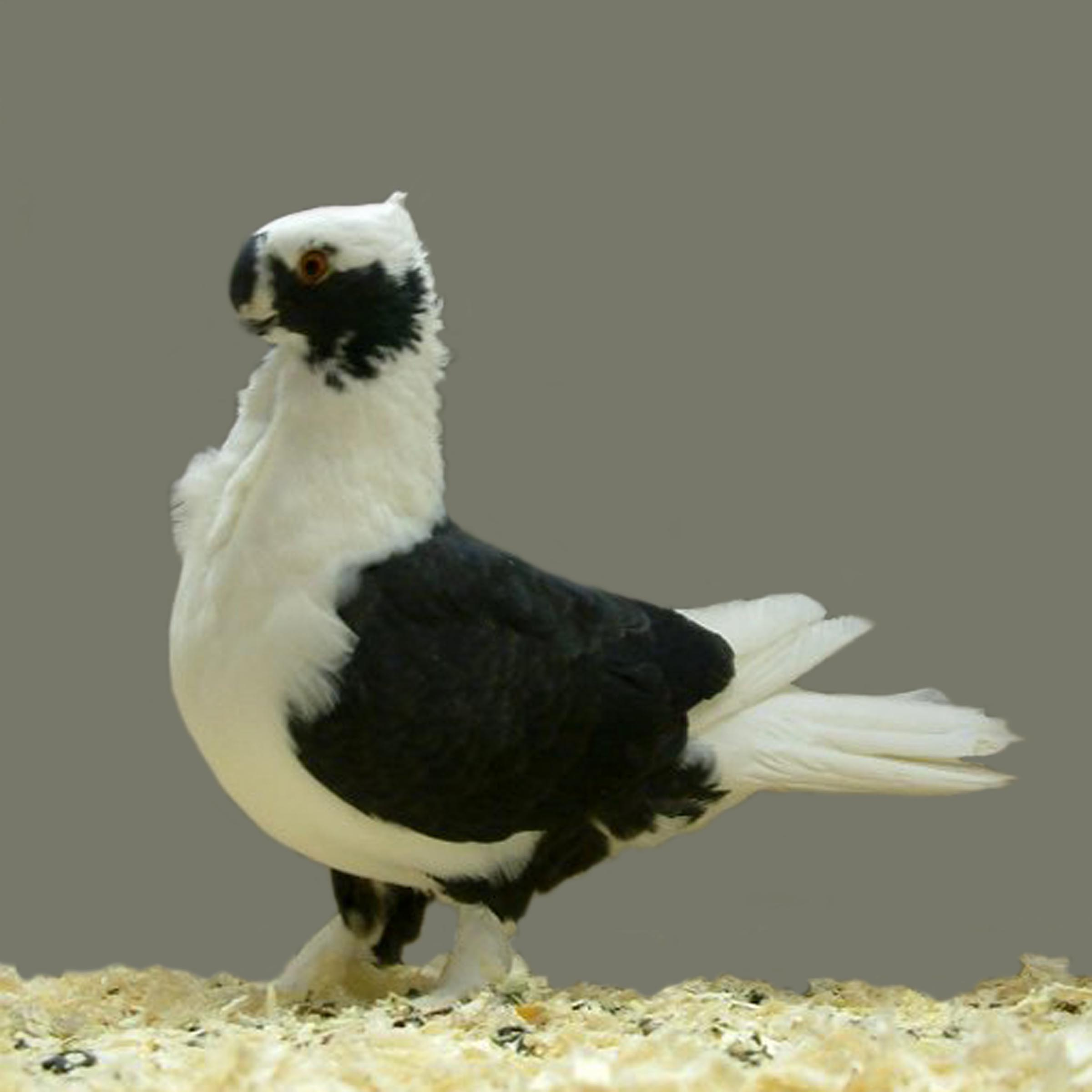
- Other names: Syrian Turbiteen; Barharisi
- Country of origin: Syria

Traits
- Crest type: Peak
- Feather ornamentation: Foot stockings

Classification
- US Breed Group: Syrian

Notes
- White saddle marked, with colored spots on head and checks

Turbiteen is a breed of pigeon developed in the Middle East with selective breeding. It is primarily considered an Oriental Frill type breed. The Turbiteen along with other varieties of domesticated pigeons are all descendants from the rock dove (Columba livia).

== Characteristics ==
These birds come in a variety of colors, are white bodied with colored wing shields, forehead snip and cheek markings. Also they have a frill of feathers down the breast and a rather short beak.

=== Colors ===
Black, blue, red, yellow, dun, dilute blue

== History ==
Believed to be developed in the Mesopotamian area. They arrived in Germany from England in 1870 and were further developed into their own unique strain.

== Status ==
Rare

== Gallery ==
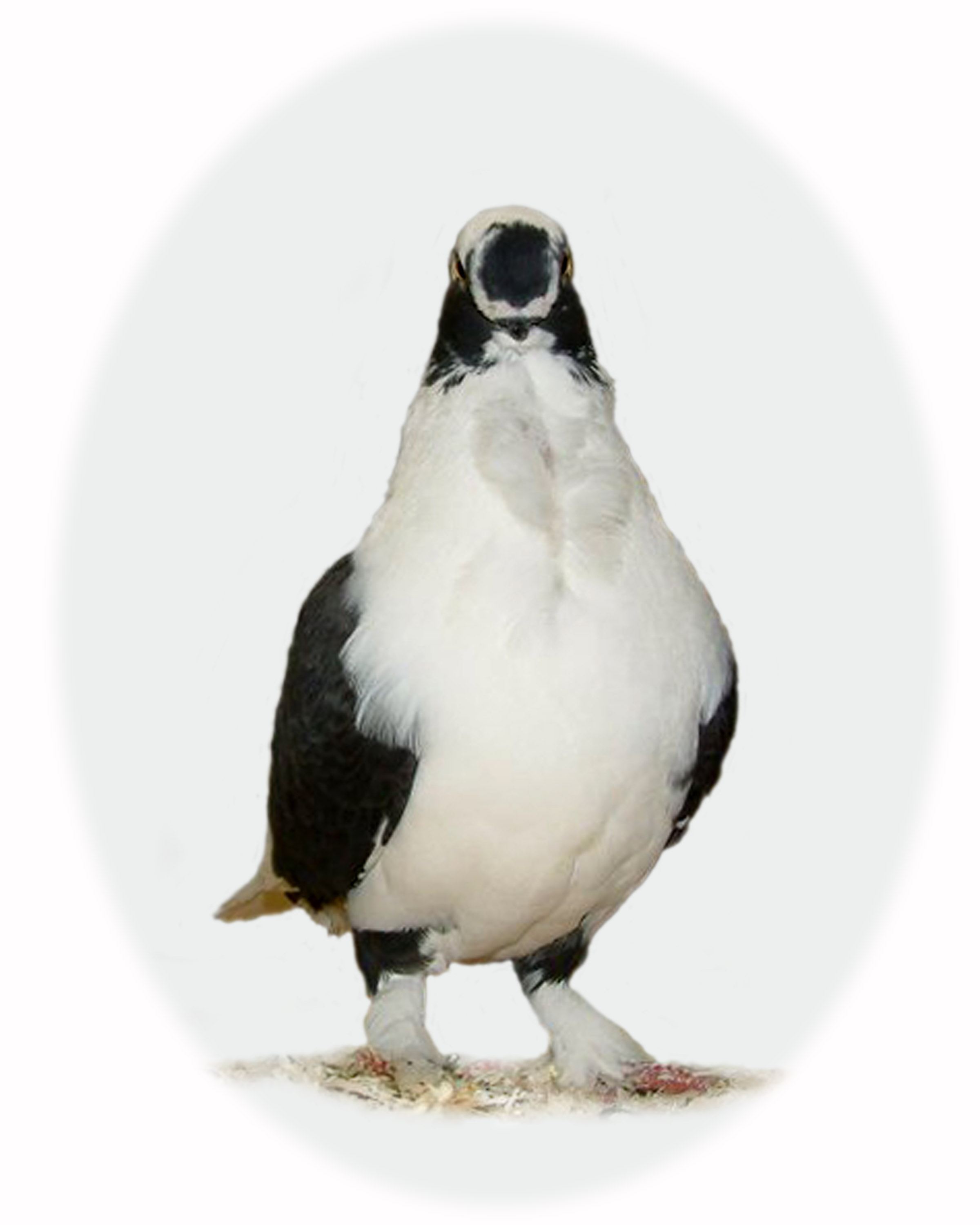
Front view

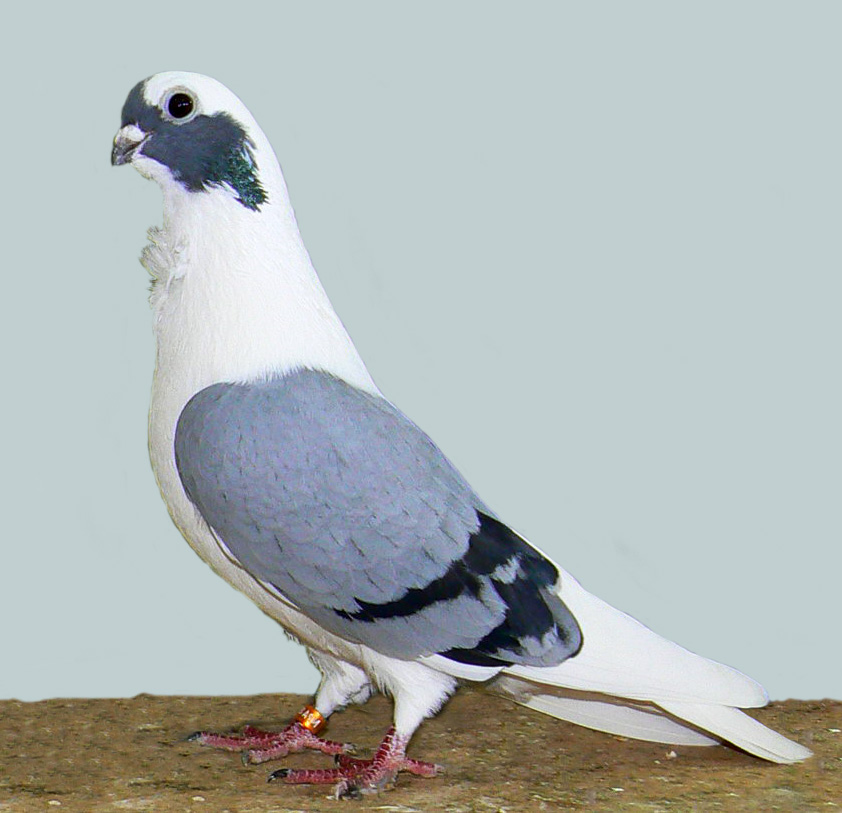
Blue bar

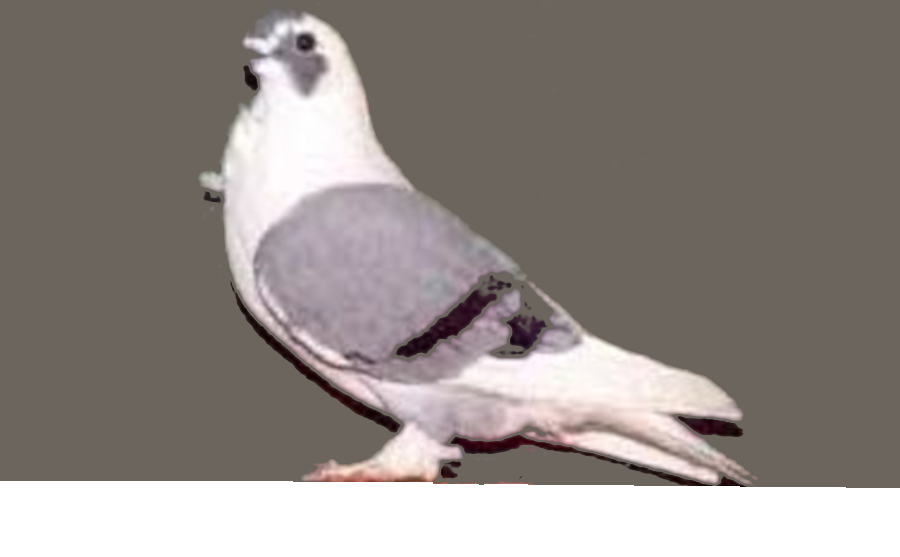
Blue bar

== See also ==
- List of pigeon breeds
- Media related to Turbiteen at Wikimedia Commons
