= Anatolian Ringbeater =

Breed of pigeon

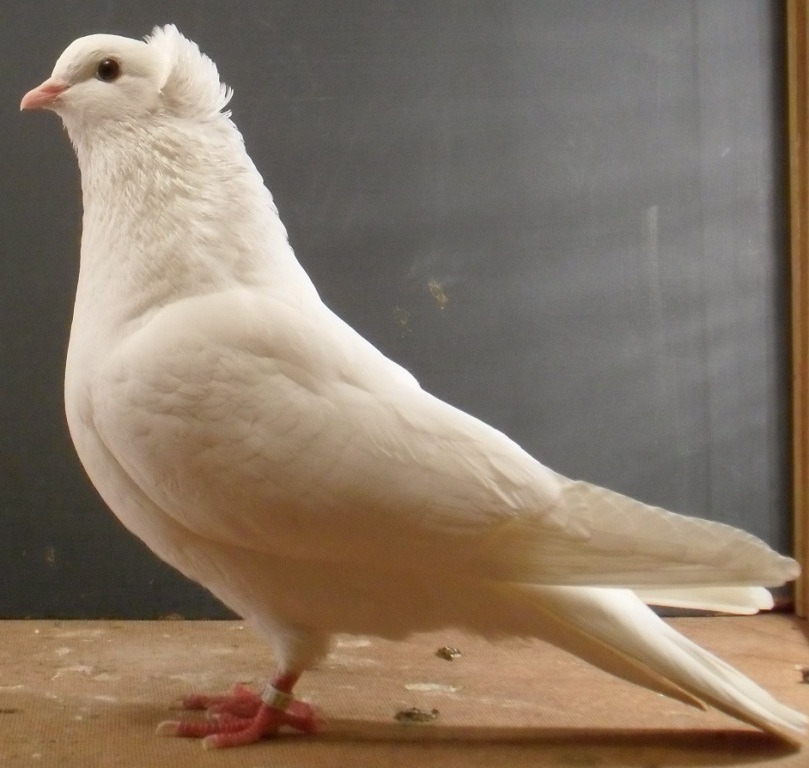
- White Ringbeater
- Conservation status: Rare
- Country of origin: Middle East

Traits
- Crest type: cap

Classification
- Australian Breed Group: Not listed
- US Breed Group: Rare FL-P
- EE Breed Group: Tumblers and Highflyers

The Anatolian Ringbeater is a breed of fancy pigeon. Anatolian Ringbeaters, along with other varieties of domesticated pigeons, are all descendants from the rock pigeon (Columba livia).

== gallery ==
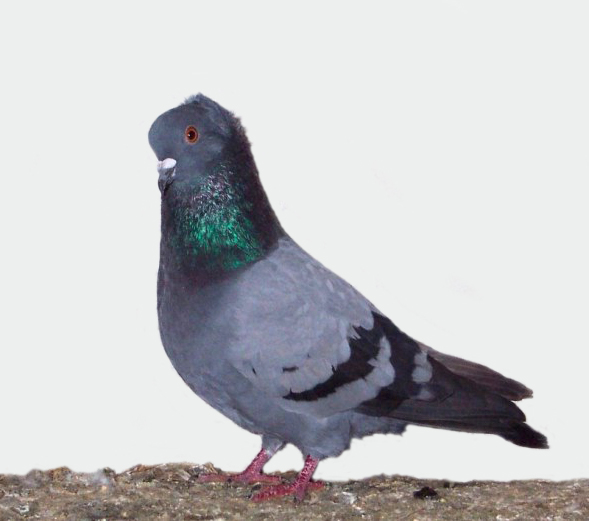
Anatolian Ringbeater, blue bar

== See also ==
- List of pigeon breeds
- Pigeon keeping
  - Pigeon Diet
  - Pigeon Housing
