= South German Shield =

Breed of pigeon

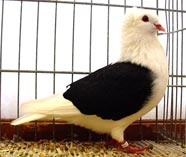
South German Shield

The South German Shield is a breed of fancy pigeon developed over many years of selective breeding. South German Shields, along with other varieties of domesticated pigeons, are all descendants from the rock pigeon (Columba livia). The whole bird is pure white except for the wing coverts which are colored.

== See also ==
- List of pigeon breeds
