= Chinese Flying pigeon =

Breed of pigeon

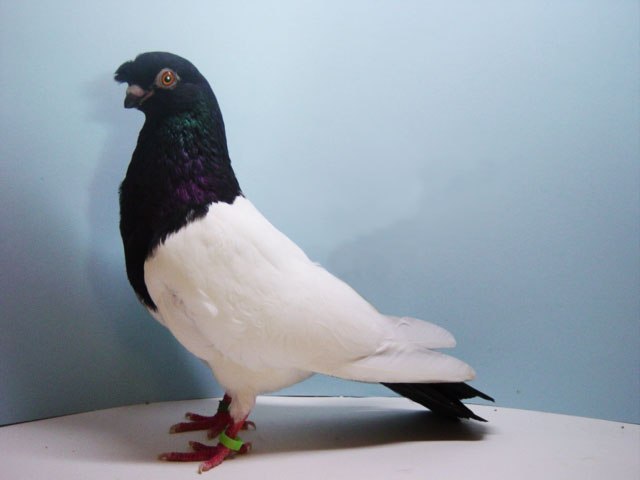
- Chinese Flying Pigeon
- Conservation status: Rare
- Country of origin: China

Classification
- Australian Breed Group: not listed
- US Breed Group: Chinese Flying Pigeons
- EE Breed Group: not listed

Notes
- The feather ornament on top of the beak is a hallmark of this breed.

The Chinese Flying pigeon is a breed of domestic pigeon. Chinese Flying pigeons, along with other varieties of domesticated pigeons, are all descendants from the rock pigeon (Columba livia).

== Origin ==
The Chinese Flying pigeon originated in China.

== See also ==
- Pigeon Diet
- Pigeon Housing
- List of pigeon breeds
