= Königsberg Colour-head Tumbler =

Breed of pigeon

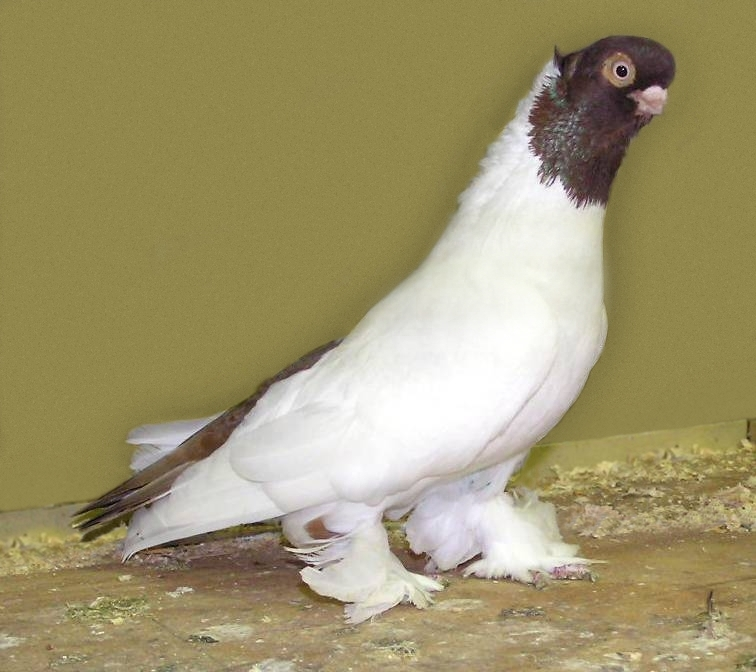
- Königsberg Colourhead
- Conservation status: not common
- Other names: Königsberg Coloured-head Tumbler (sometimes also Colourhead, Coloured Head, Color-head)
- Country of origin: Prussia

Classification
- US Breed Group: Fancy
- EE Breed Group: Tumbler and Highflyer

The Königsberg Colour-head Tumbler (German: Königsberger Farbenkopf) is a breed of fancy pigeon developed in the mid-18th century in Königsberg, East Prussia, from which it gets its German name. This breed of pigeon is well known in Russia because Königsberg is now a part of Russia, and is known as Kaliningrad.

== General Impression ==
The Königsberg Colour-head comes in the colours black, red, white, yellow, and blue.

Their rudders and heads can be of any of the above colours. Conformance standards for this breed require perfect body posture and high carriage.

== Flying ==
They are mostly kept as fancy (show) pigeons, but with regular training they can be taught to fly well.

== Keeping ==
Keeping and breeding requires care. The breed is brevirostrate, which can cause difficulty in breeding and keeping. A good breeding program requires foster-parents, usually medium-beaked and long-beaked pigeons.

== See also ==
- List of pigeon breeds
