= Domino Frill =

Pigeon breed

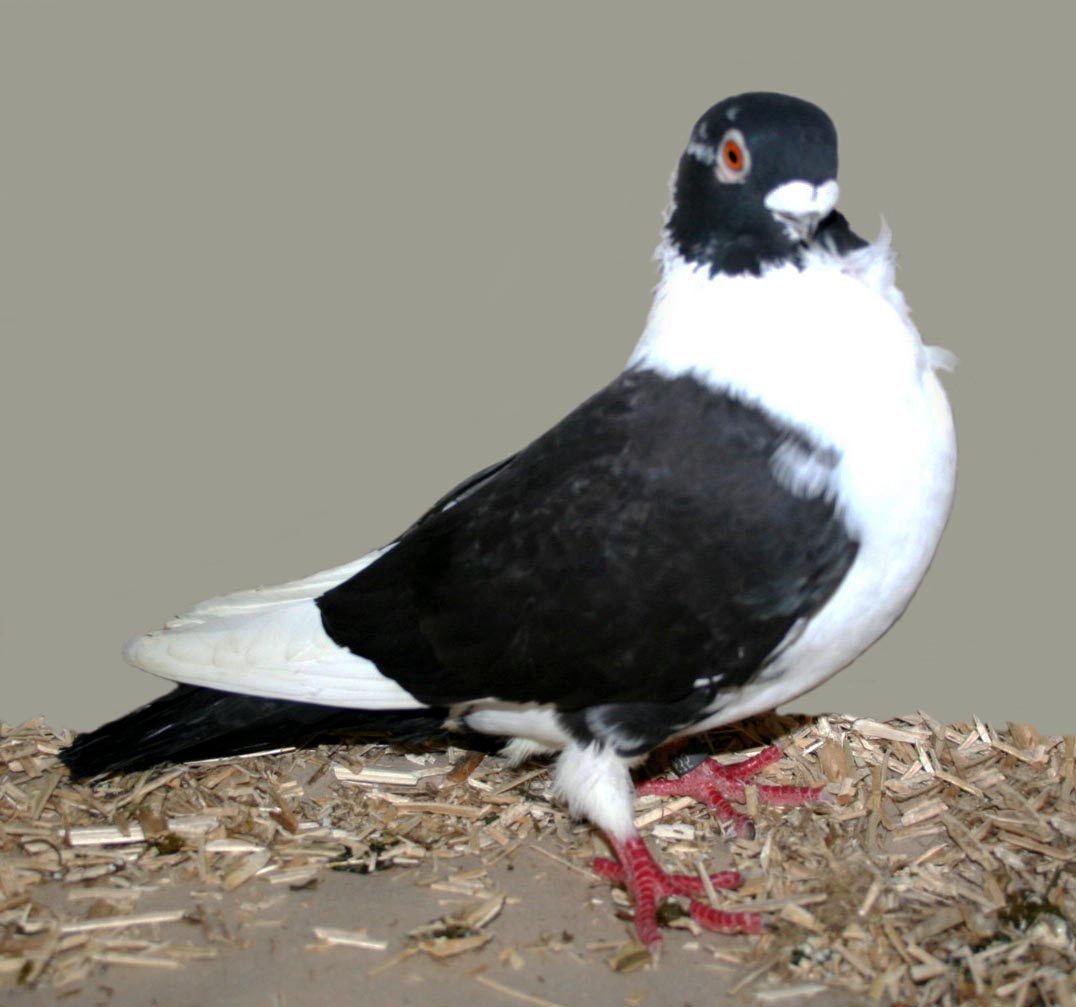
Domino Frill

The Domino Frill is a breed of fancy pigeon. Domino Frills, along with other varieties of domesticated pigeons, are all descendants from the rock pigeon (Columba livia).

== See also ==
- List of pigeon breeds
