= Ancient Tumbler =

Breed of pigeon

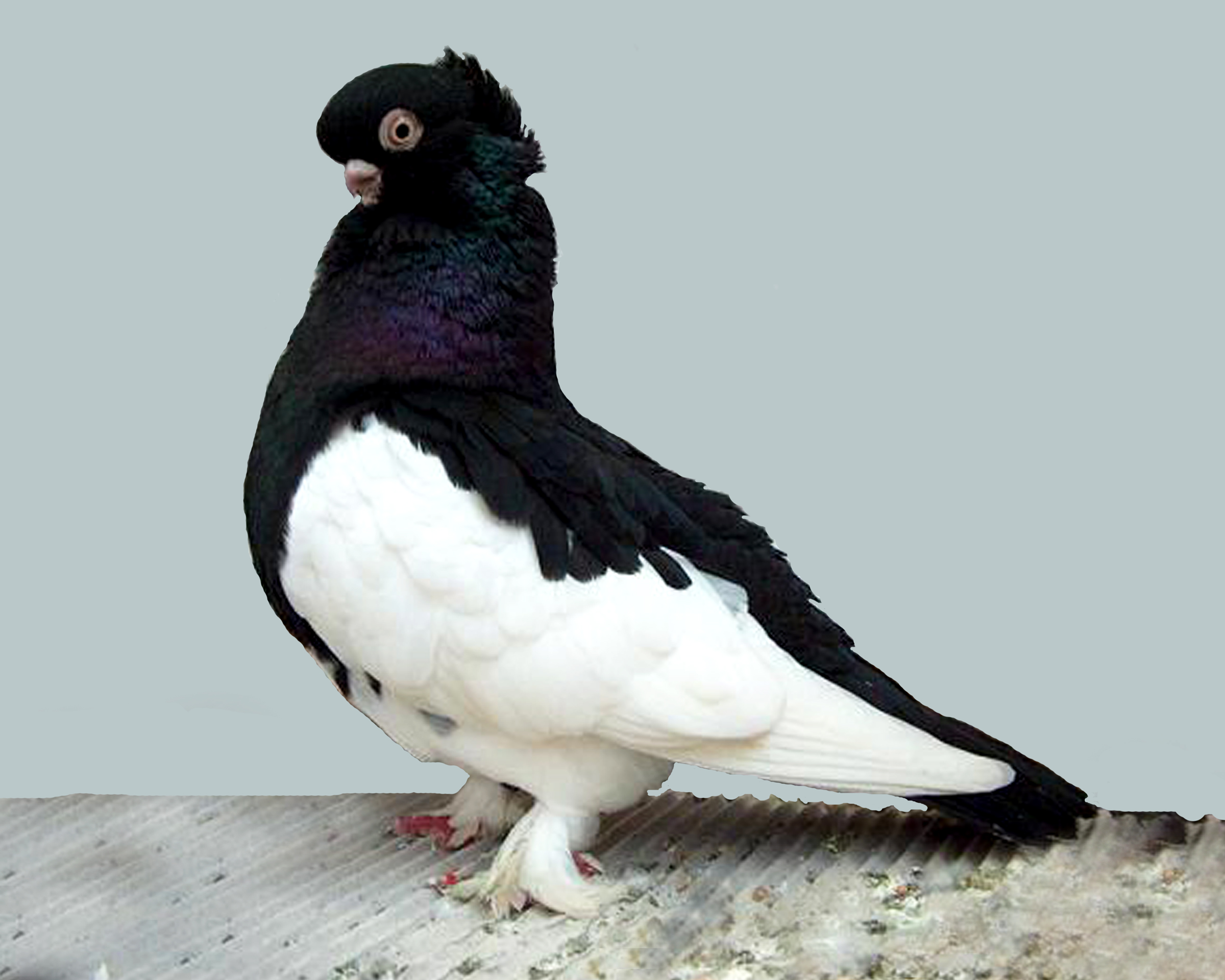
Ancient Tumbler

The Ancient Tumbler is a breed of fancy pigeon. Ancient Tumblers, along with other varieties of domesticated pigeons, are all descendants from the rock pigeon (Columba livia). Although the breed was initially bred in Berlin, the bird was introduced into England by a member of the National Peristeronic Society.

== Gallery ==
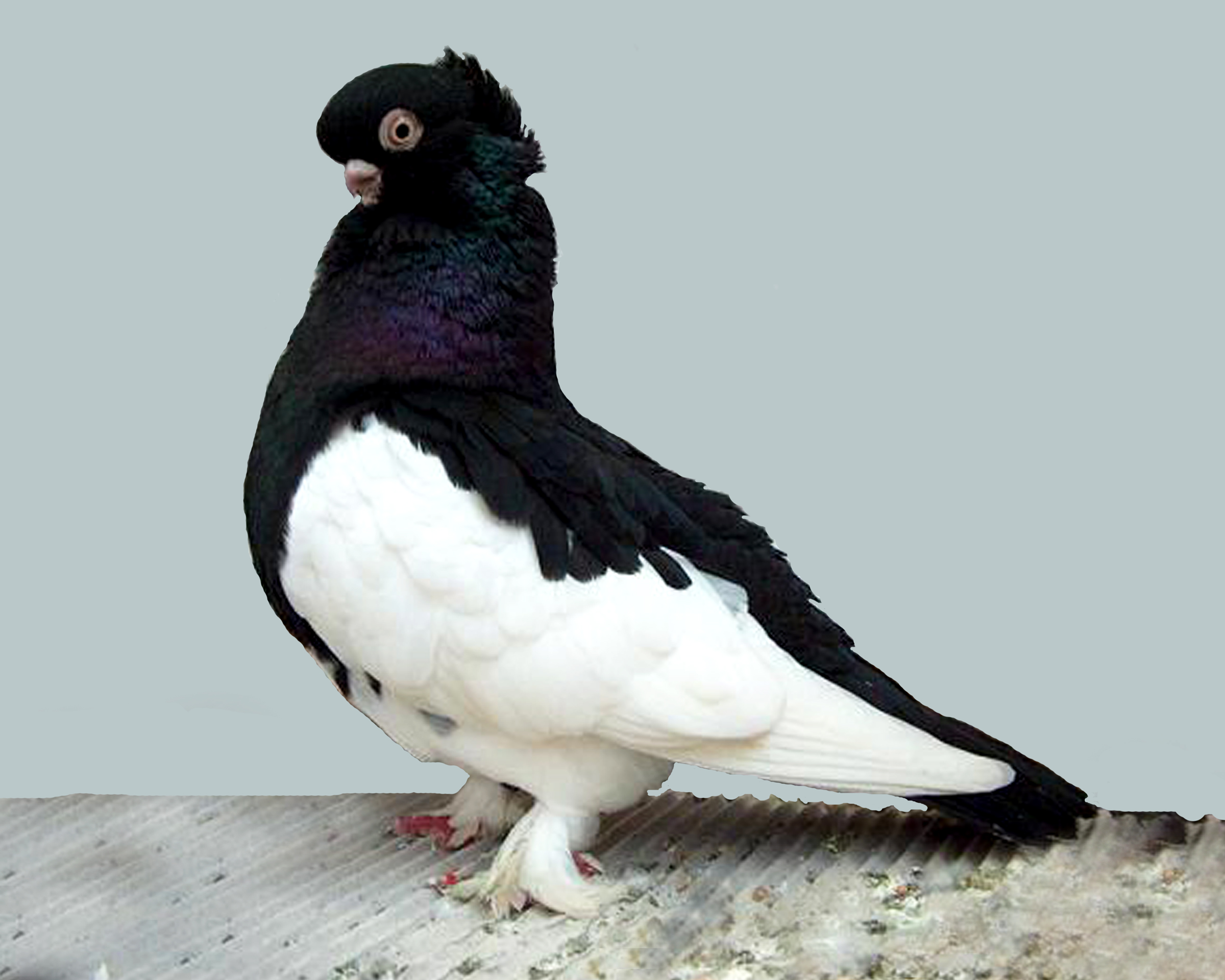
Crested black magpie-marked

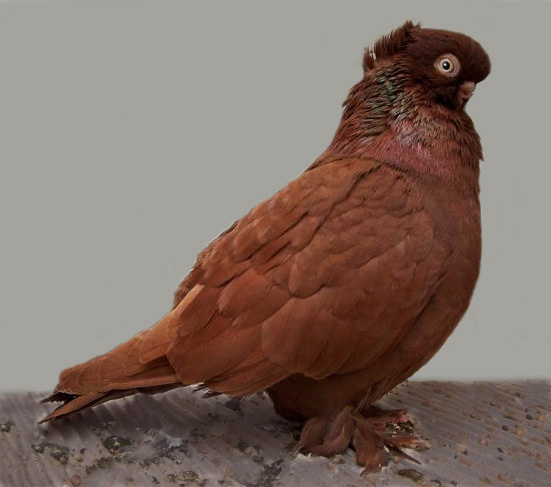
Red crested)

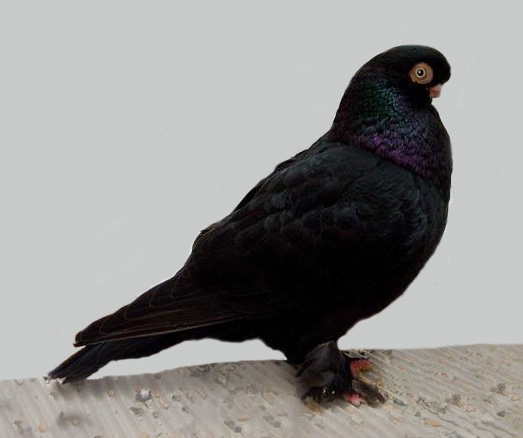
Black plain head

== See also ==
- List of pigeon breeds
