= Thuringian Colour pigeons =

Group of pigeon breeds

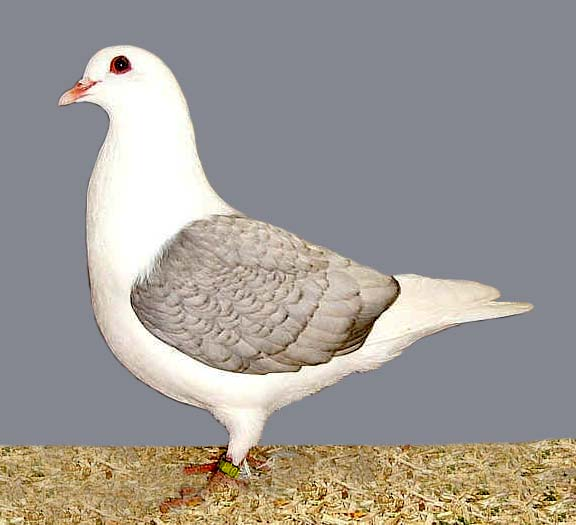
Thuringen Shield (opal)

The Thuringian Colour pigeons are a group of breeds of fancy pigeons developed over many years of selective breeding. Thuringian Colour pigeons, along with other varieties of domesticated pigeons, are all descendants of the rock dove (Columba livia). The breed group is known for several different colours and markings. Varieties include the Thuringian Breast, Thuringian Monk, Thuringian Shield (picture), Thuringian Whitetail and the Thuringian Spot. The breed can be either plain or shell crested, but is always clean-legged.

== See also ==
- List of pigeon breeds
