= Italian Owl pigeon =

Breed of pigeon

Italian Owl
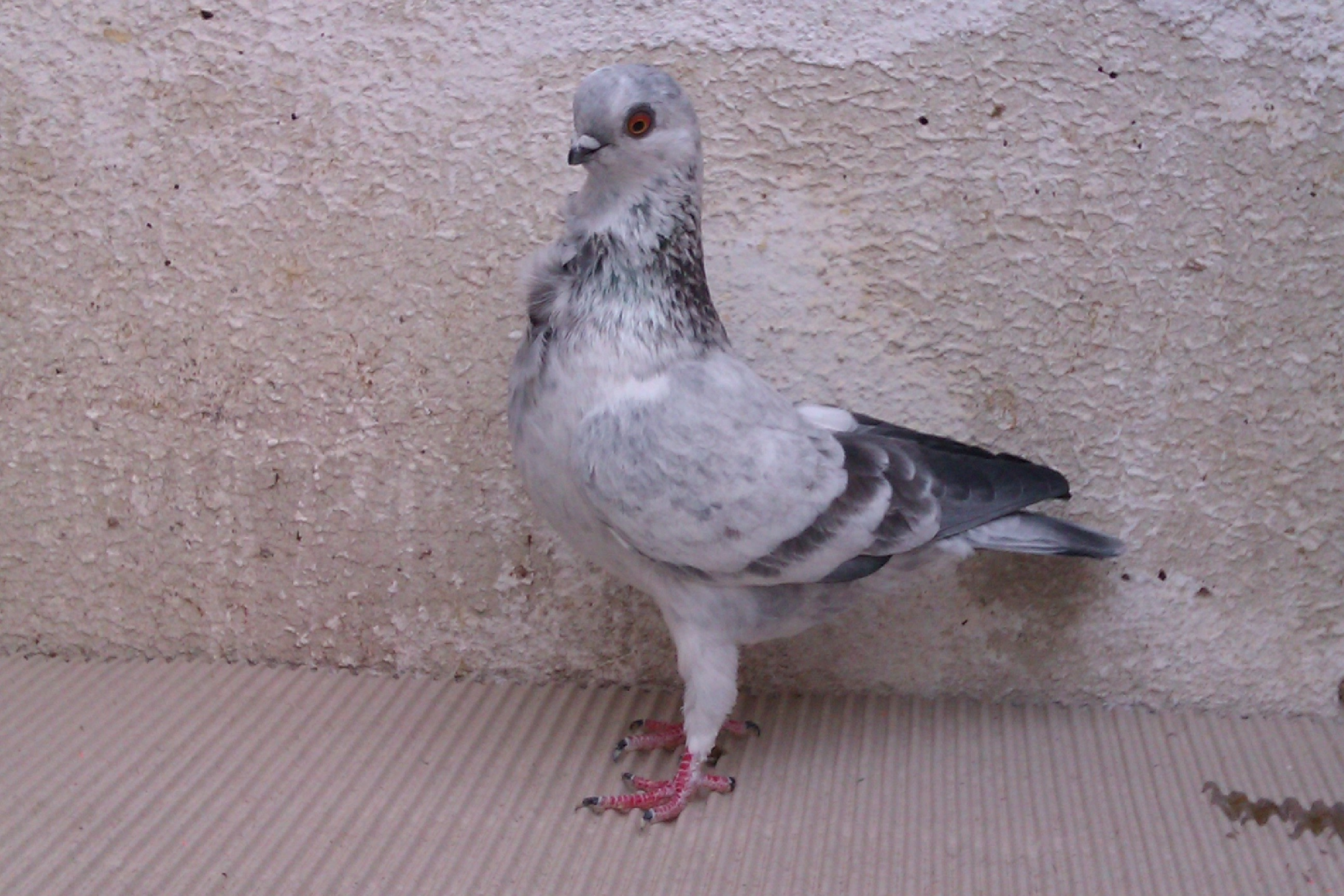
- Blue gizzle
- Conservation status: uncommon
- Country of origin: Italy
- Distribution: Europe, US
- Type: Show

Traits
- Lifespan: 12 years
- eye color: orange and bull

Classification
- Australian: Not listed
- European: Owl
- US: Owl & Frills

The Italian Owl pigeon is a breed of fancy pigeon, originating from Italy Italian Owls are noted for their proud horizontal stance, relatively small size compared with many other fancy breeds, broad and rounded breast that displays a prominent chest frill, a somewhat flat head that is rounded at the front and back, a rather short tail, and orange eyes unless a bird is white or pied, in which cases the eyes are "bull" (black). Healthy Italian Owls are perky birds that stand on their toes and give the appearance that they are ready to spring forward. The breed is represented in the United States by the Valencian Figurita and Italian Owl Club, and in Germany by the Sonderverein der Züchter Italienische Mövchen. Italian Owls are bred in many colors. These include blue, silver, red, and yellow in the major three patterns of check, barred and barless; recessive reds, yellows and whites (these recessive birds are completely red, yellow or white and have no pattern), spread blacks, pied in the major colors and in various patterns; gold-collared birds in the major colors and patterns; grizzle; and almond, andalusian and indigo.

== Gallery ==
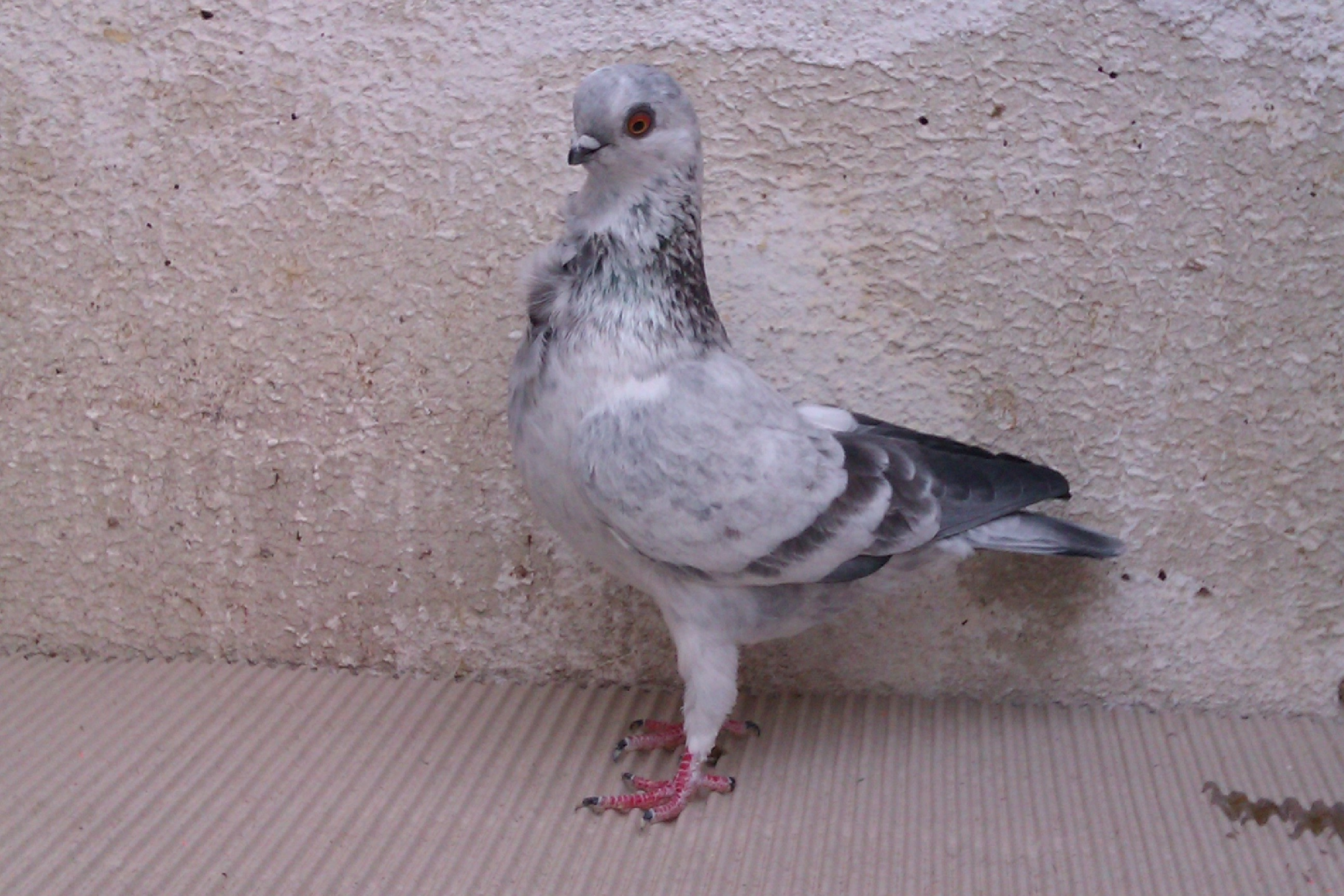
Blue Grizzle

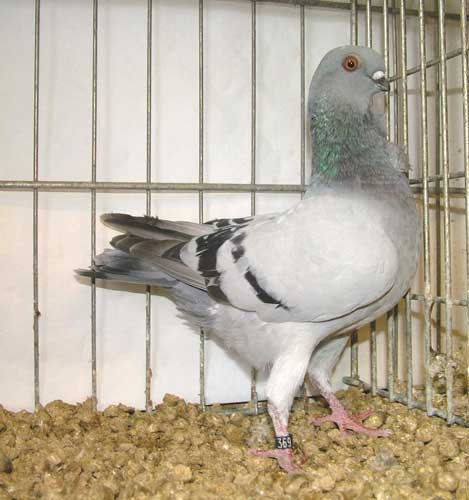
Blue bar

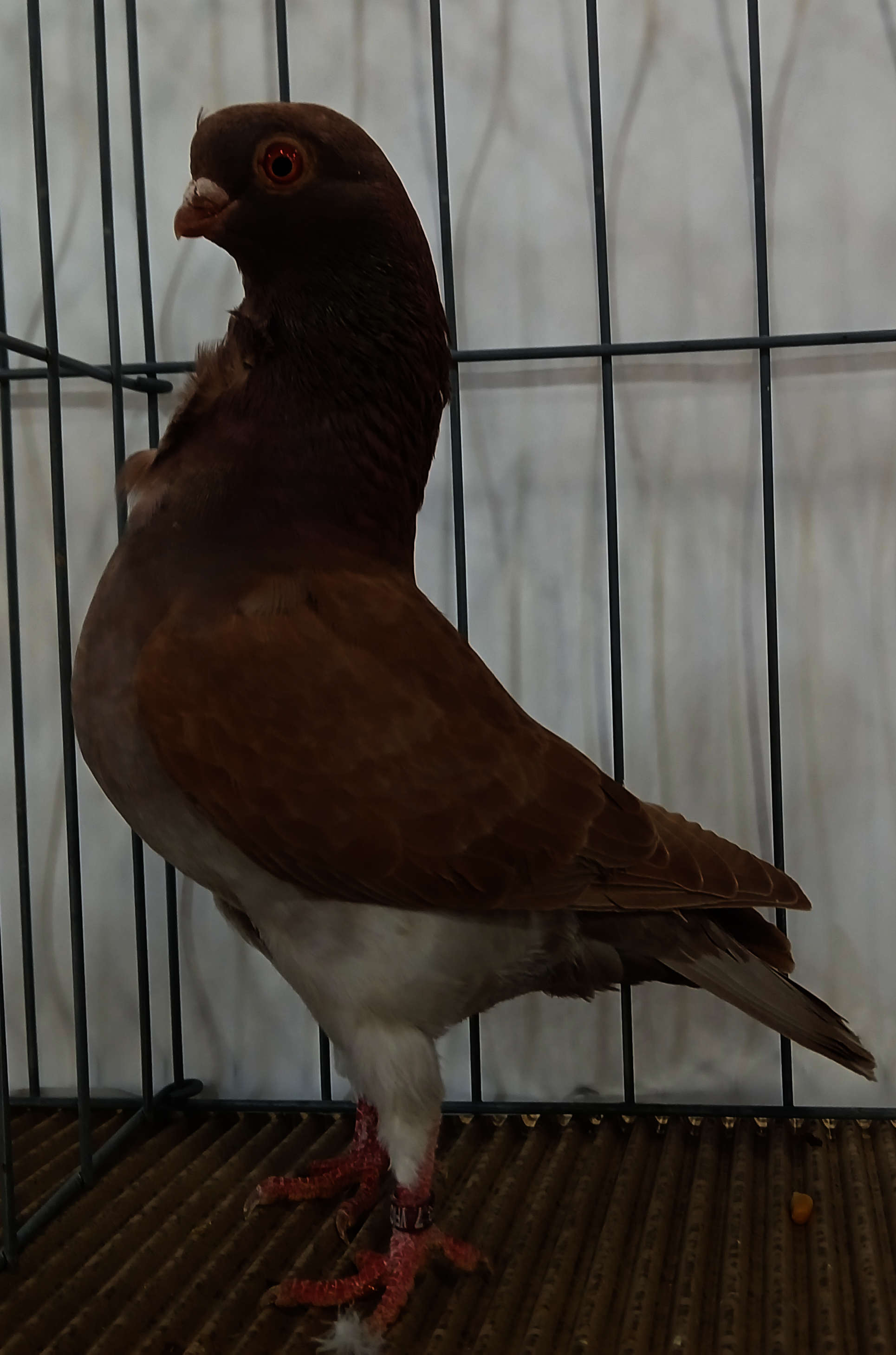
Red check

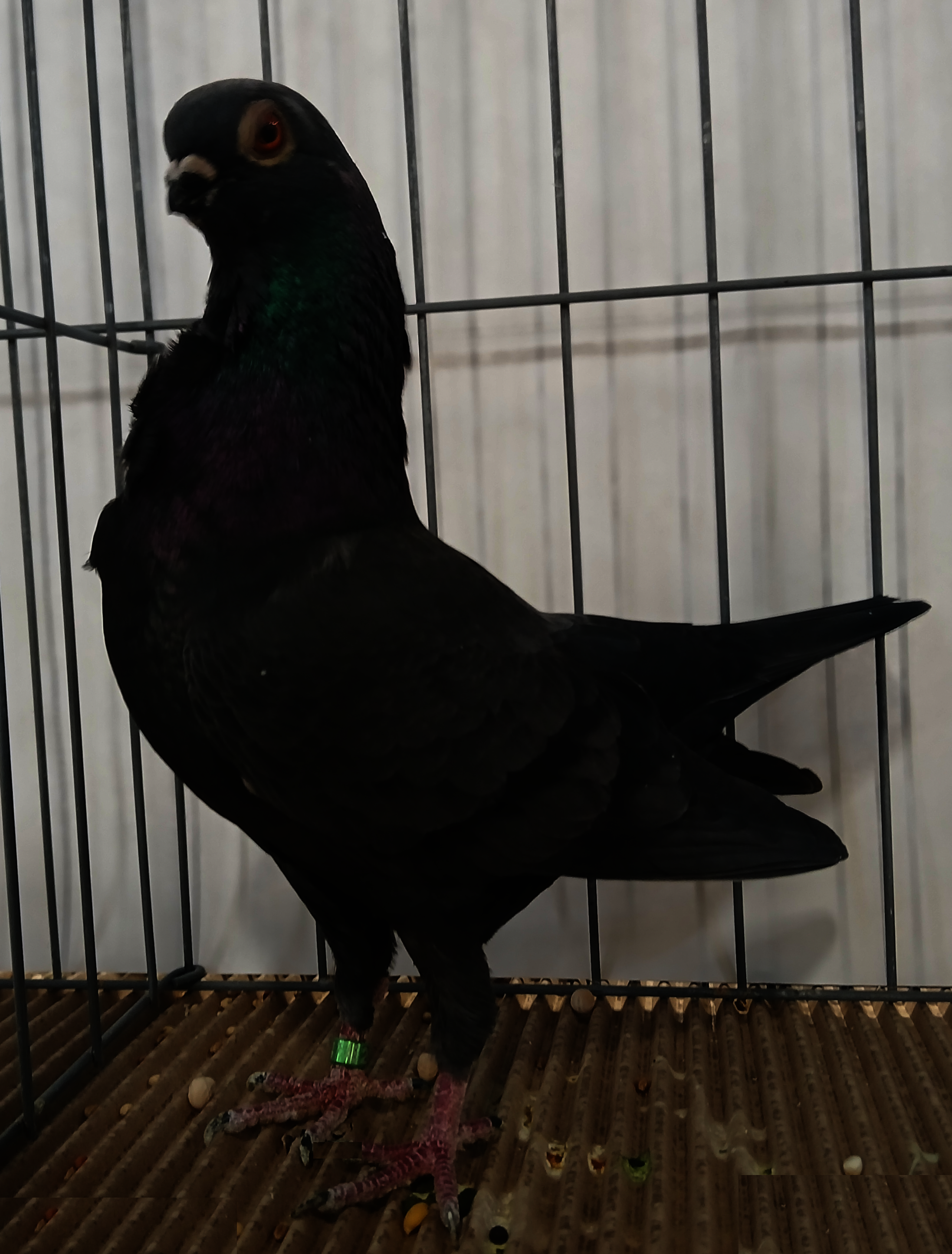
Black bar

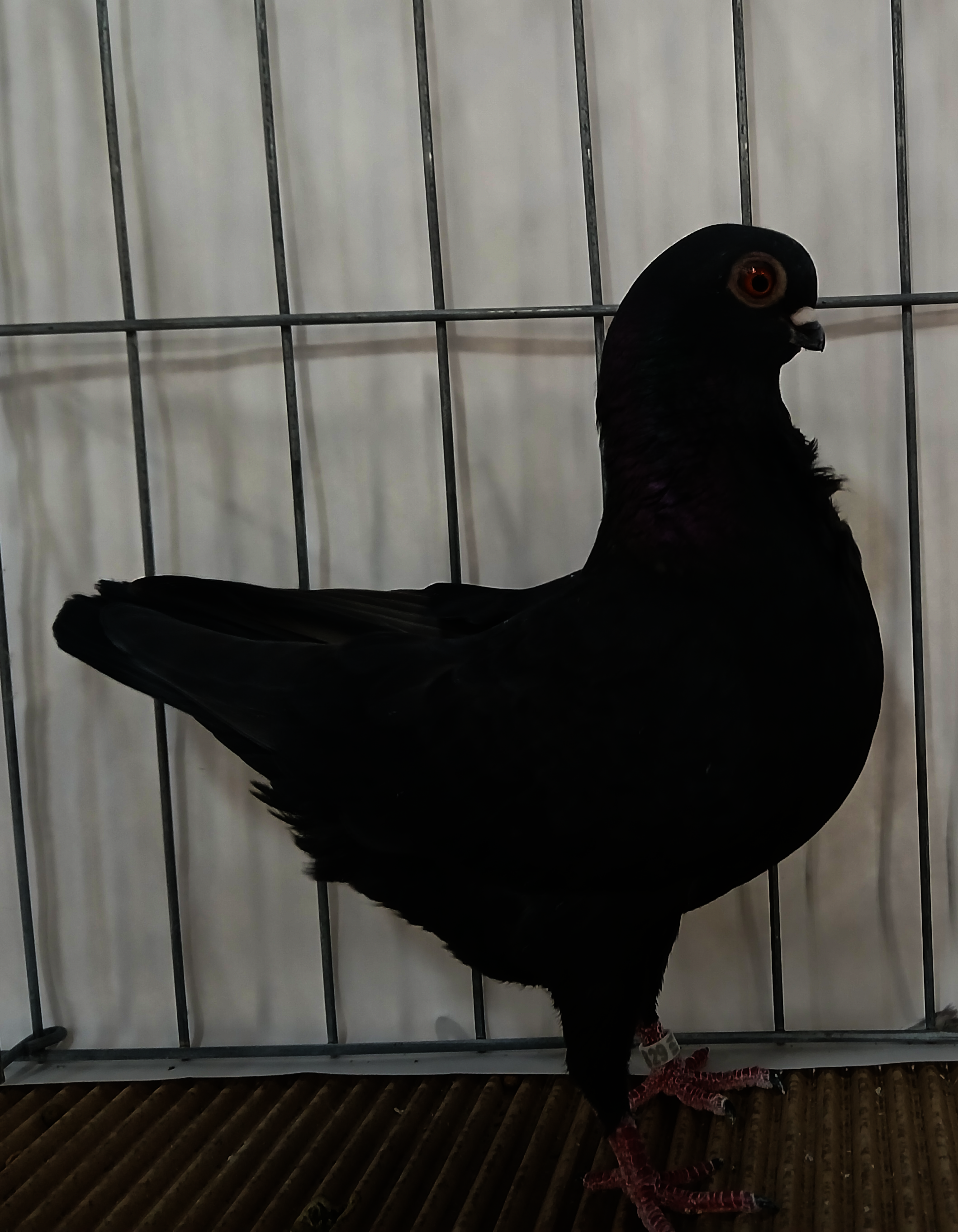
Black

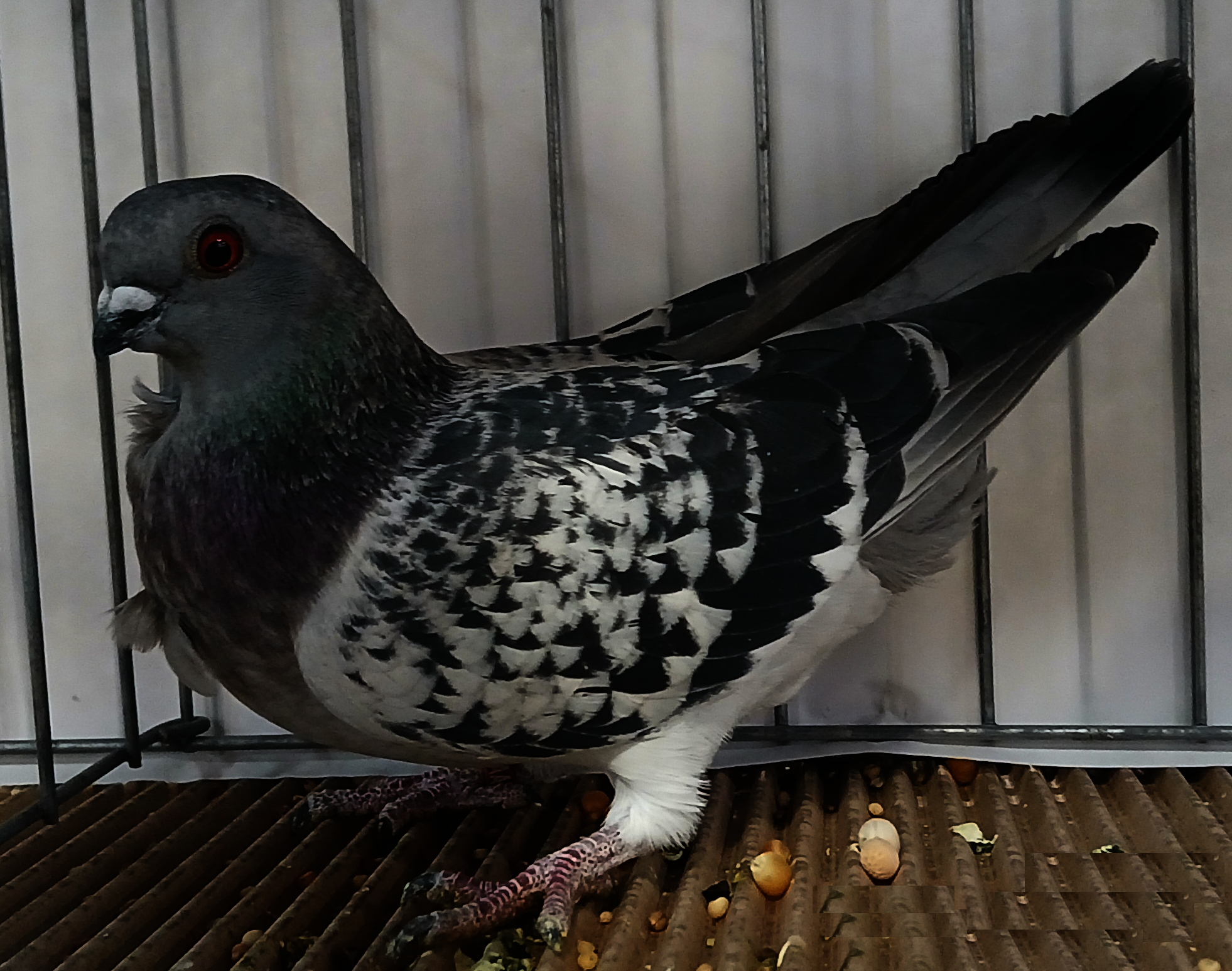
Blue check

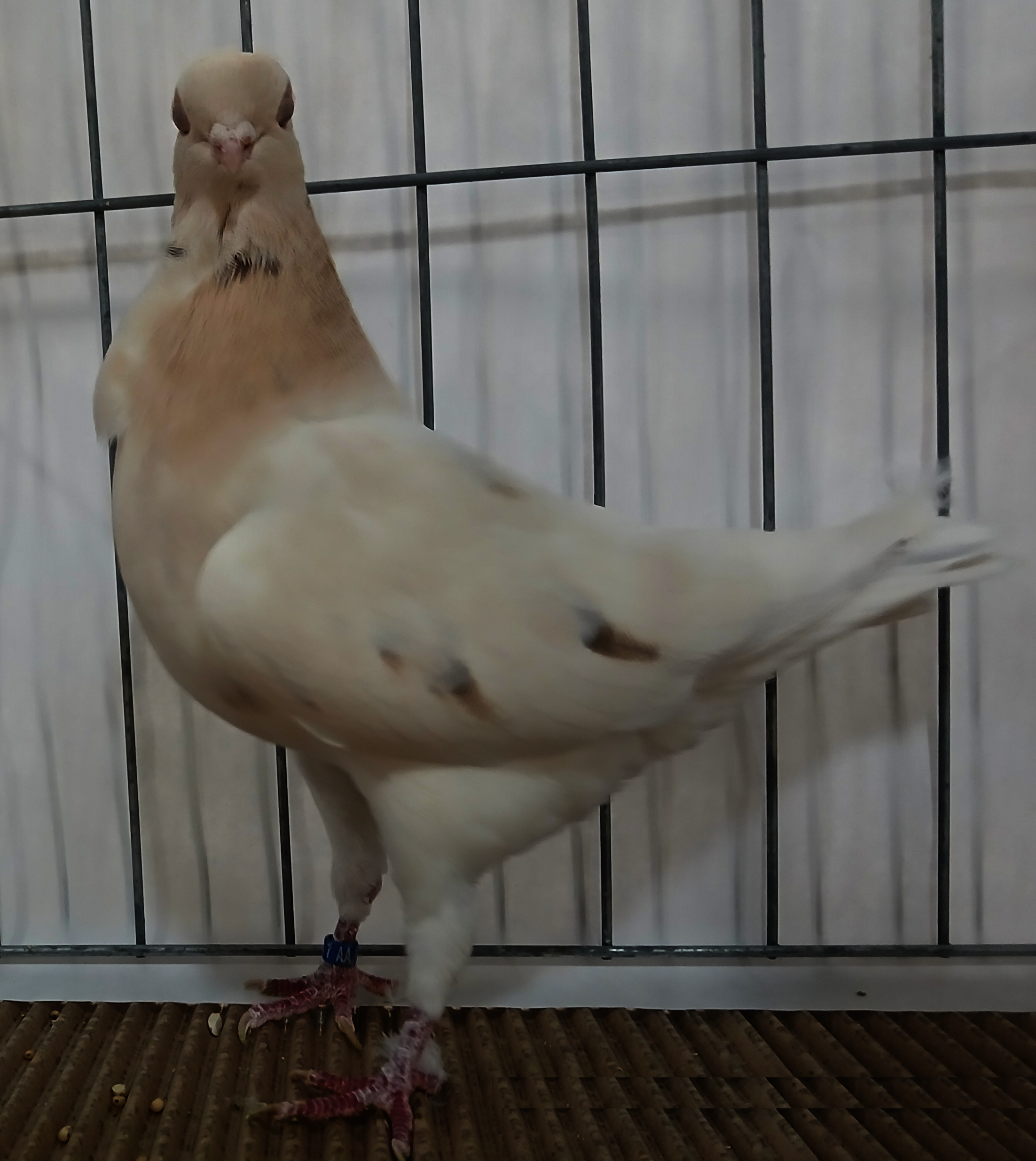
Cream

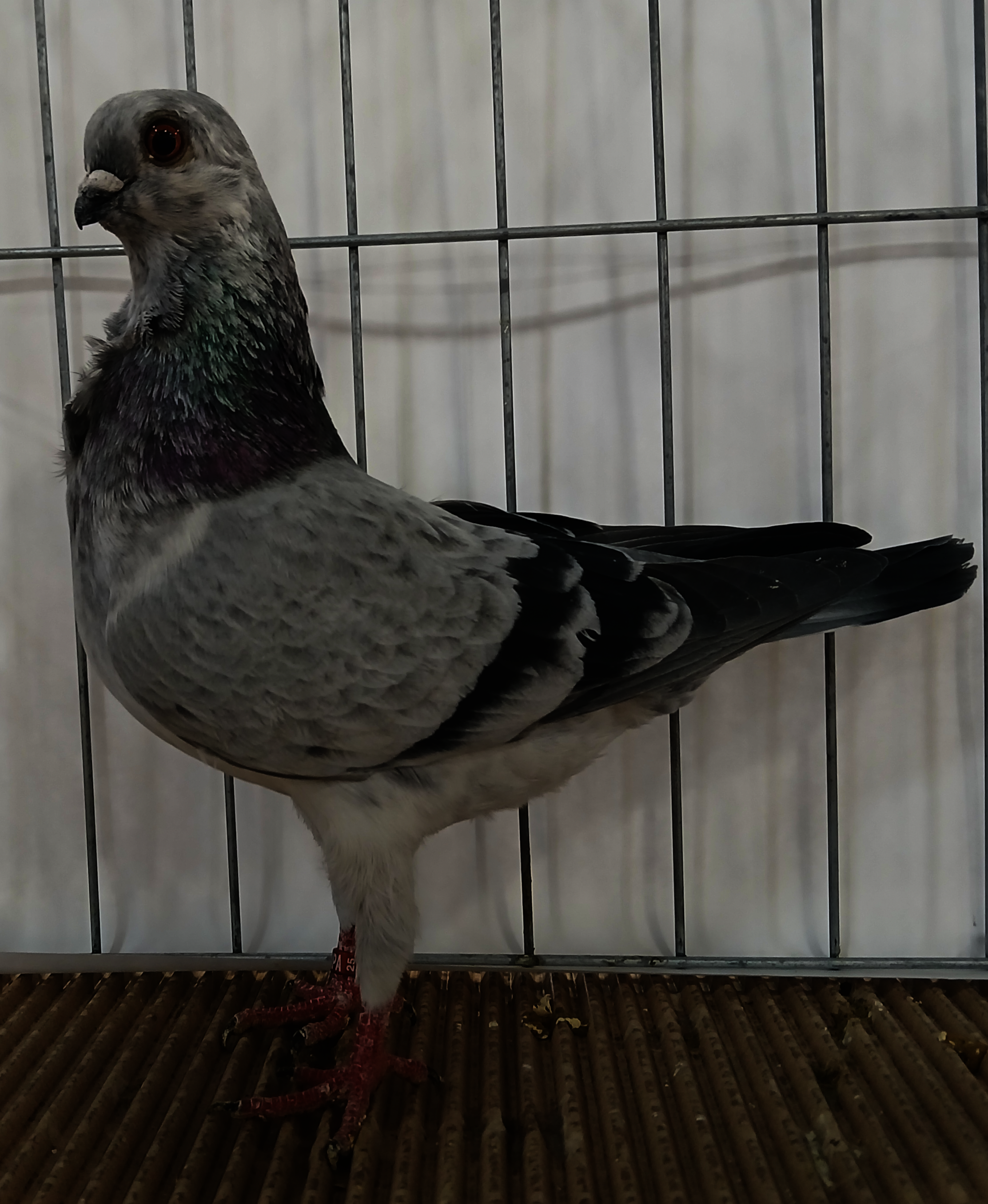
Grizzle

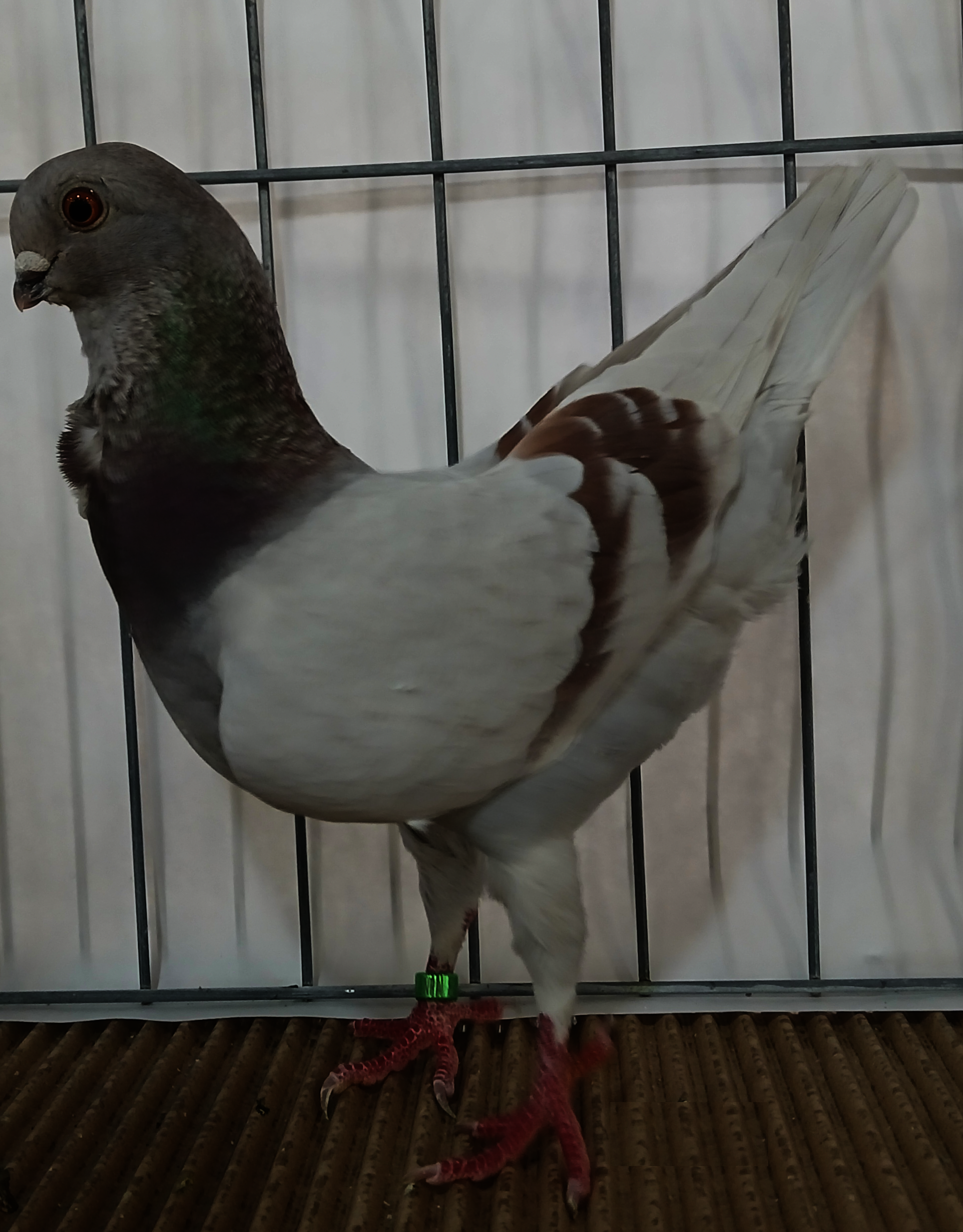
Red bar

== See also ==
- Pigeon Diet
- Pigeon Housing
- List of pigeon breeds
