= Ice pigeon =

Breed of pigeon

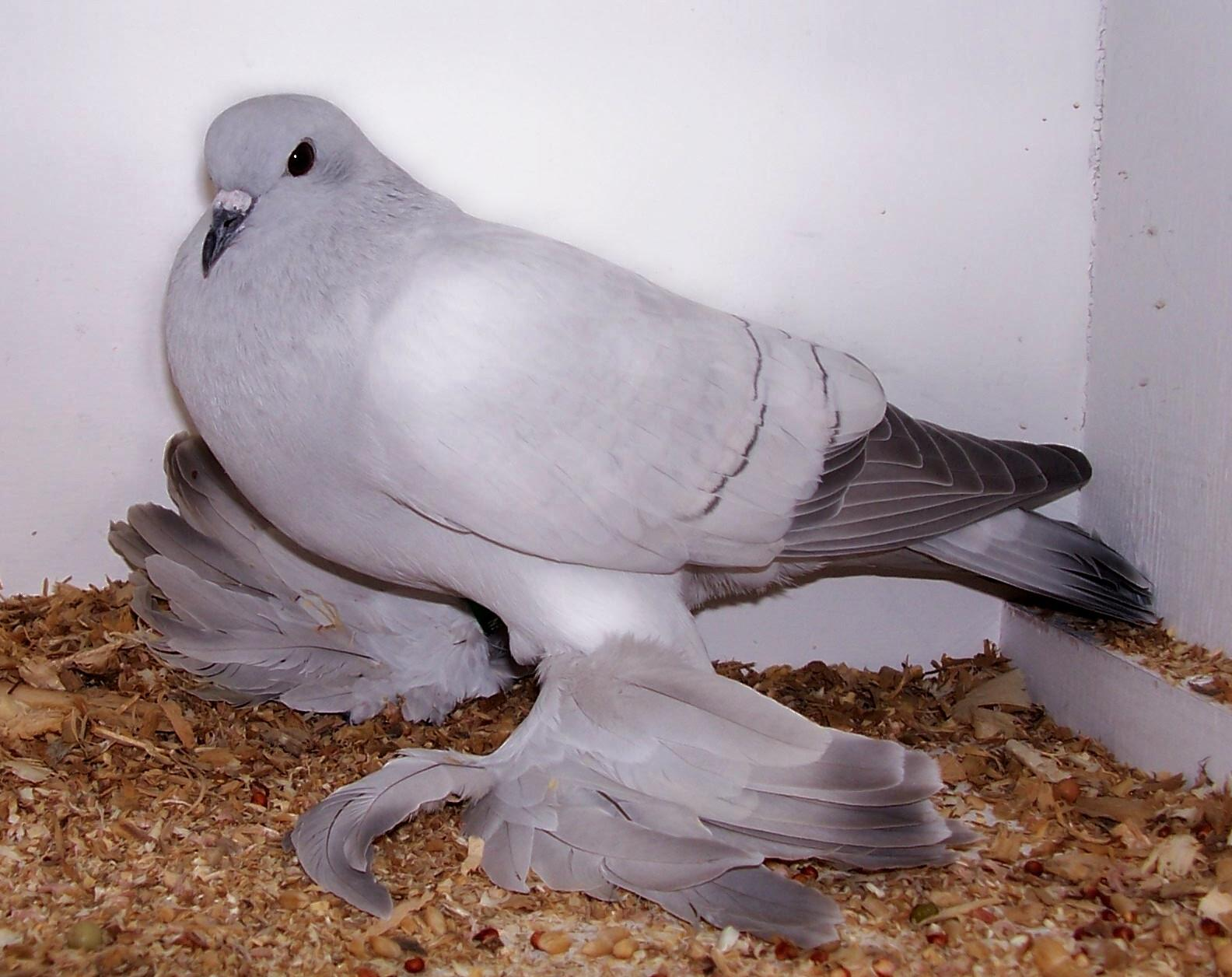
- Conservation status: Common
- Country of origin: Germany

Classification
- US Breed Group: Fancy

The Ice pigeon (Polish: Lazurek; German: Eistaube) is a breed of fancy pigeon developed over many years of selective breeding. Ice pigeons, along with other varieties of domesticated pigeons, are all descendants from the rock pigeon (Columba livia).

In 1846, Charles Darwin is known to have crossbred the Ice pigeon in order to ascertain colour patterns. This work came just three years before his groundbreaking publication, On the Origin of Species.

== Description ==
The breed is known and named for its "ice-blue" colour. It was first developed in the region from eastern Germany to western Poland, with most early breeding in Saxony and Silesia. Two or three distinct lineages, bred for centuries, were merged to form the modern-day Ice pigeon: one was light-winged with dark eyes, and another one or two had black wing markings and reddish eyes.

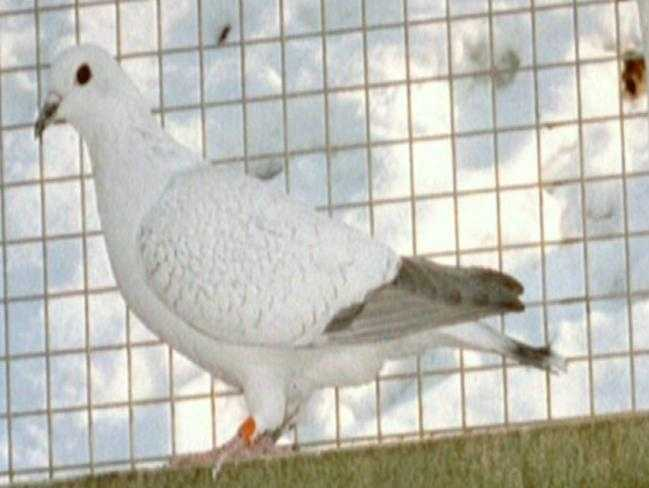
Light-winged variety with unfeathered legs, photographed in bright daylight

The Ice pigeon has several varieties, differing in the type and color of their wing pattern. All are otherwise unpatterned, except for a wide black tail-end band; the ends of the rectrices are white. The basic color of Ice pigeons is a pale grey. They appear even lighter due to their abundant powder down, which covers the entire plumage in whitish dust; its Polish name Lazurek ("glazed pigeon") refers to this. The English and German names refer to the coloration, which in bright light appears "icy" white, with a very slight bluish hue. All varieties may have feathered or unfeathered feet.

Due to the feather dust responsible for the Ice Pigeon's unique coloration, they may not be suitable for people with allergies.

== Appearance ==
This pigeon is a fancy bird-known for its ice-blue coloration. The head of this pigeon mutation is somewhat oval, and have smooth head. It has a few assortments, which are varying in the sort and shade of their wing design. Yet, the essential shade of these feathered creatures is a pale dim. Eyes of these types of pigeons are of various shading relying upon the assortment. The dark banned and checked adaptation has orange to yellow orange shaded eyes. And every single other assortment have bruised eyes.

== See also ==
American Pigeon Journal 1949 July

- List of pigeon breeds
