= English Magpie pigeon =

Breed of pigeon

English Magpie
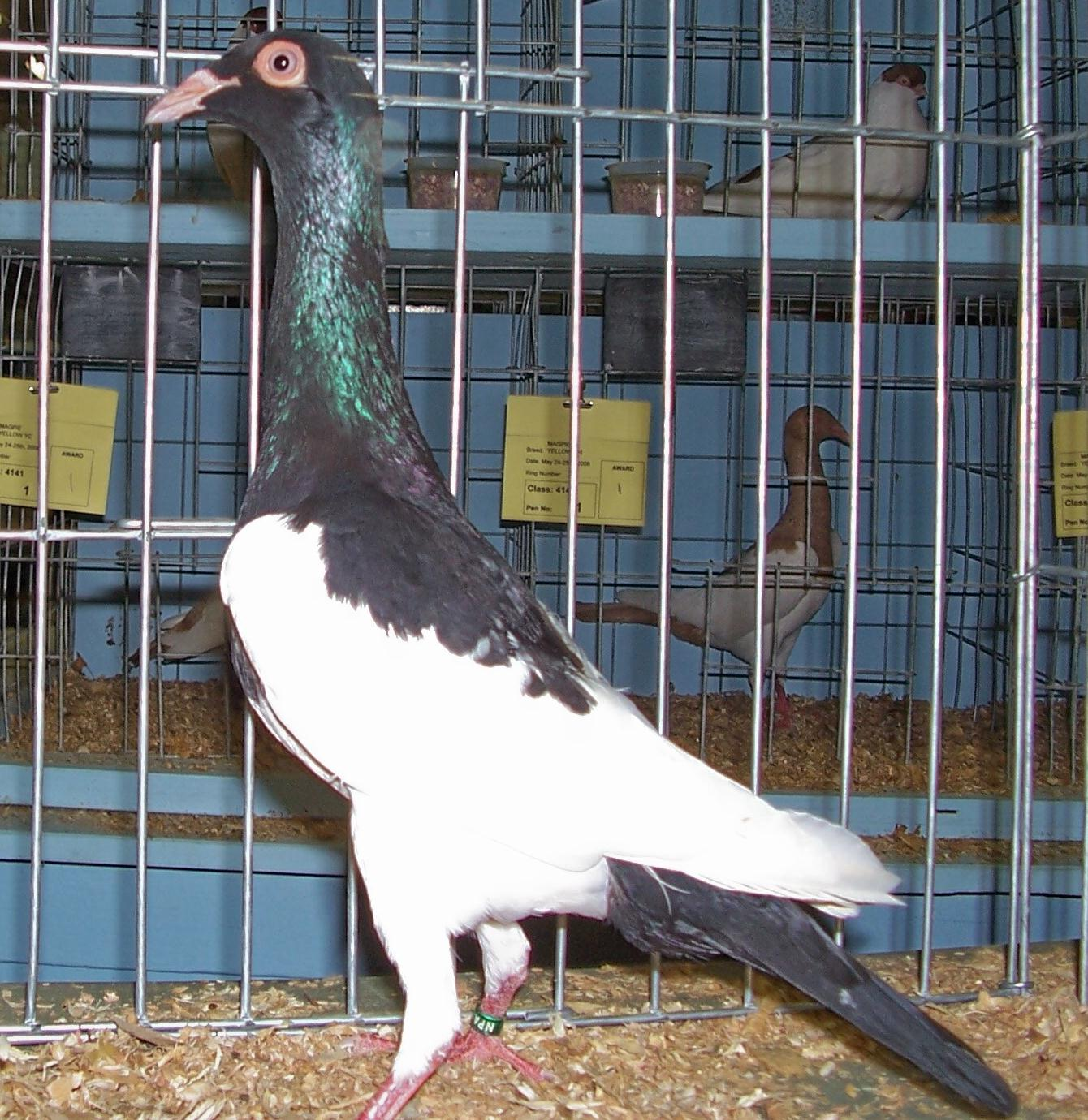
- Magpie pigeon
- Conservation status: Common

Classification
- US Breed Group: Fancy
- EE Breed Group: Tumbler and Highflyer

The English Magpie is a breed of fancy pigeon developed over many years of selective breeding. They can also be very easily spotted in England and in most parts of America. Magpies, along with other varieties of domesticated pigeons, are all descendants from the rock pigeon (Columba livia). The original Magpie was one of the old tumbler varieties, coming via Germany from Denmark about 1900.

== See also ==
- Pigeon Diet
- Pigeon Housing
- List of pigeon breeds
