= Aachen Lacquer Shield Owl pigeon =

Breed of pigeon

Aachen Lacquer Shield Owl
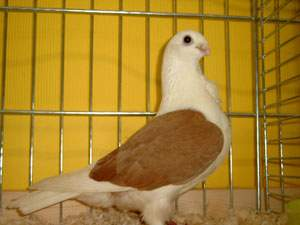
- Conservation status: Common
- Other names: Aachen Luster Shield, Aachen Shield Owl
- Country of origin: Germany

Classification
- US Breed Group: Owls & Frills
- EE Breed Group: Owl

The Aachen Lacquer Shield Owl (German: Aachener Lackschildmövchen) is a breed of fancy pigeon developed over many years of selective breeding, by dedicated breeders for over 50 Years. Aachen Lacquer Shield Owls along with other varieties of domesticated pigeons are all descendants of the rock dove (Columba livia).

== See also ==
- List of pigeon breeds
- Pigeon keeping
  - Pigeon Diet
  - Pigeon Housing
- Media related to Aachen Luster Shield at Wikimedia Commons
