= American Roller =

Breed of pigeon

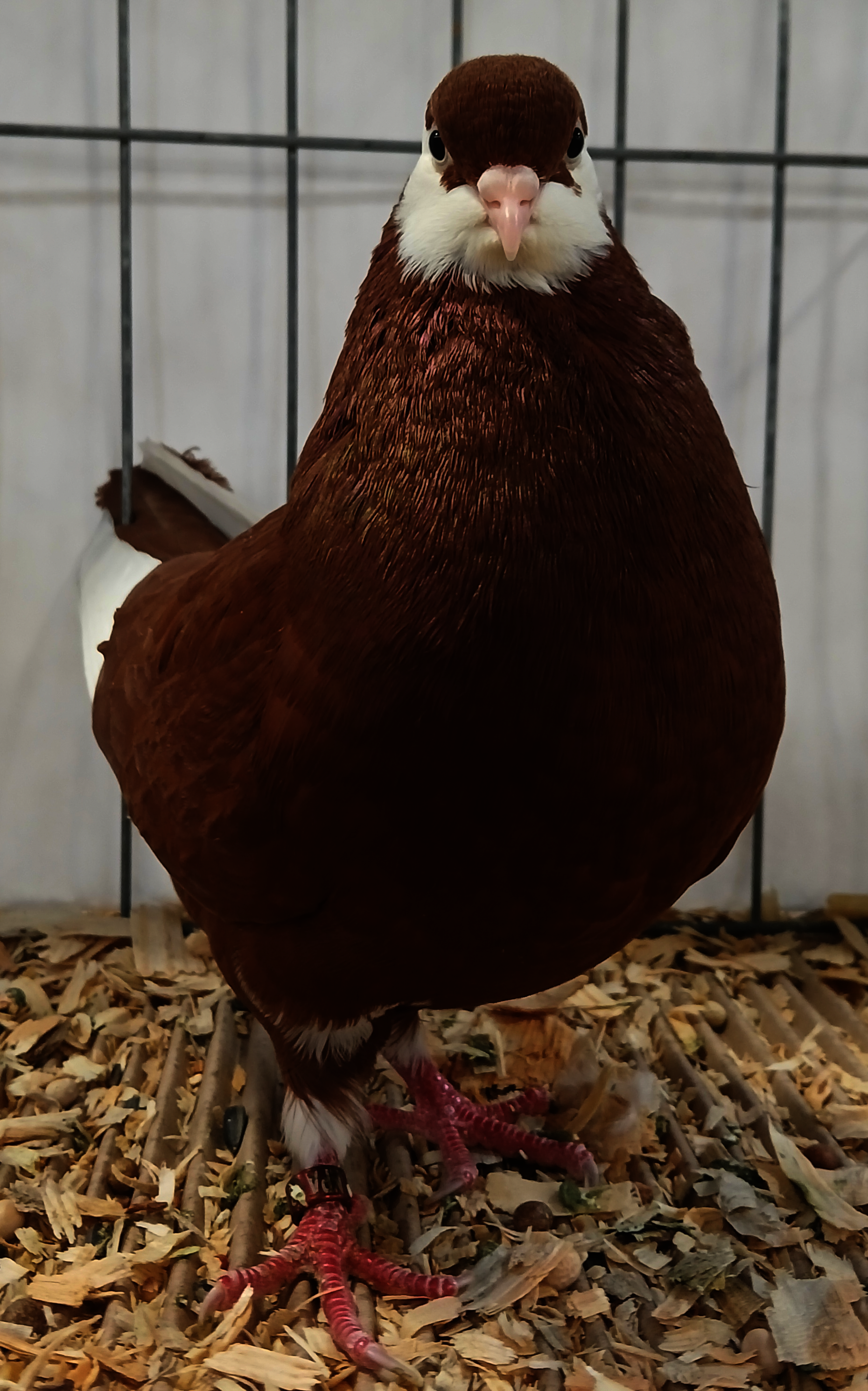
- Conservation status: uncommon
- Distribution: United States
- Type: Show
- Use: Flying

Traits
- Weight: Male: 9 onzes; Female: 8 onzes
- Color: all colors
- Lifespan: 12 years

Classification
- Australian: Not listed
- European: Not listed
- US: Fancy Breeds

Notes
- Australia and the EU has a standard listing for the Birmingham Roller a related strain

The American Roller is a fancy pigeon developed over many years of selective breeding. The breed originated from tumbler strains found in England as early as 1765. Their morphological appearance is well described by both Eaton and Fulton. Through the selective breeding process, a performing breed was developed, and was named rollers because of their unique flying style. Occasionally they would interrupt their forward flight by rolling backwards as they flew.

== History ==
The American Roller was developed as a continued separation of Roller strains, rather than as a concerted effort to develop a new breed. Originally, Rollers were brought into Canada by J.V. McAree of Toronto. He obtained them from the Whittinghams, residing in the Birmingham area of England. During 1932, several more importations were made into the U.S., also from the Birmingham area but from William Pensom. These pigeons became known as a strain of their own, setting them slightly apart from the other Rollers for a while. The United Roller Club of America (URCA) started in 1935, and recognizing that separate strains of Rollers were being developed, supported all strains including show Rollers. America in this instance was North American, including the U.S. as well as Canada. Rollers were being shown by 1936 at the National Pigeon Association's show at Peoria, Illinois, but a show standard of structural excellence was not developed until 1946 by the URCA. After the Second World War, the men coming home to their Rollers, in addition to flying them, started showing them. It was probably as much for the increased social interaction for those of a feather, as for the competitive aspect. In addition to local clubs, many regional clubs were established, including the Midwest, the Cleveland, Virginia, and the Southwest. There was also a strain specific club, the Pensom Roller club. The American Roller Club was established in 1951, again both as a flying and show type. By 1957, 81 American Rollers were shown at the local Oregon event. In the Roller family, four strains were now common under the breed banner of roller. They were Whittinghams, Birmingham, Pensom and the American roller, but as of 2026, only the Birmingham and American remain. Only the U.S. has a standard for the American Roller, and a few birds were exhibited at the National show in 2026 at Oklahoma City. Australia has a standard for the Birmingham Show Roller, as does the E.U. and Great Britain, the fountainhead for these pigeon types, now only has a generic class of Show Roller.

== Appearance ==
Birds bred for performing generally do not conform to the standard as closely as those bred specifically for the show standard. The American Roller is a tame bird that is easy to handle, fitting well into even a young person's hands, making for an excellent breed for beginners. It raises its own young. It is a bit smaller than most pigeons, being between 8 and 12 ounces. The body should be gracefully proportioned, being somewhat tear shaped, from the breast to the tail. Their stance is not quite horizontal being 35-45 degrees. The beak is not a distinct feature, but must be rather fingernail colored, and the eyes are a pearl white. The wing feathers should lie on top of the tail, be strong and broad, and extending to within 1/2 inch of the end of the tail. The tail of 12 feathers is held tightly together, to approximately one tail feather in width. They come in a wide variety of colors, which are rich and lustrous. The main colors of the breed are red, black, yellow, and dun. But other colors can be found including andalusian.

== Gallery ==
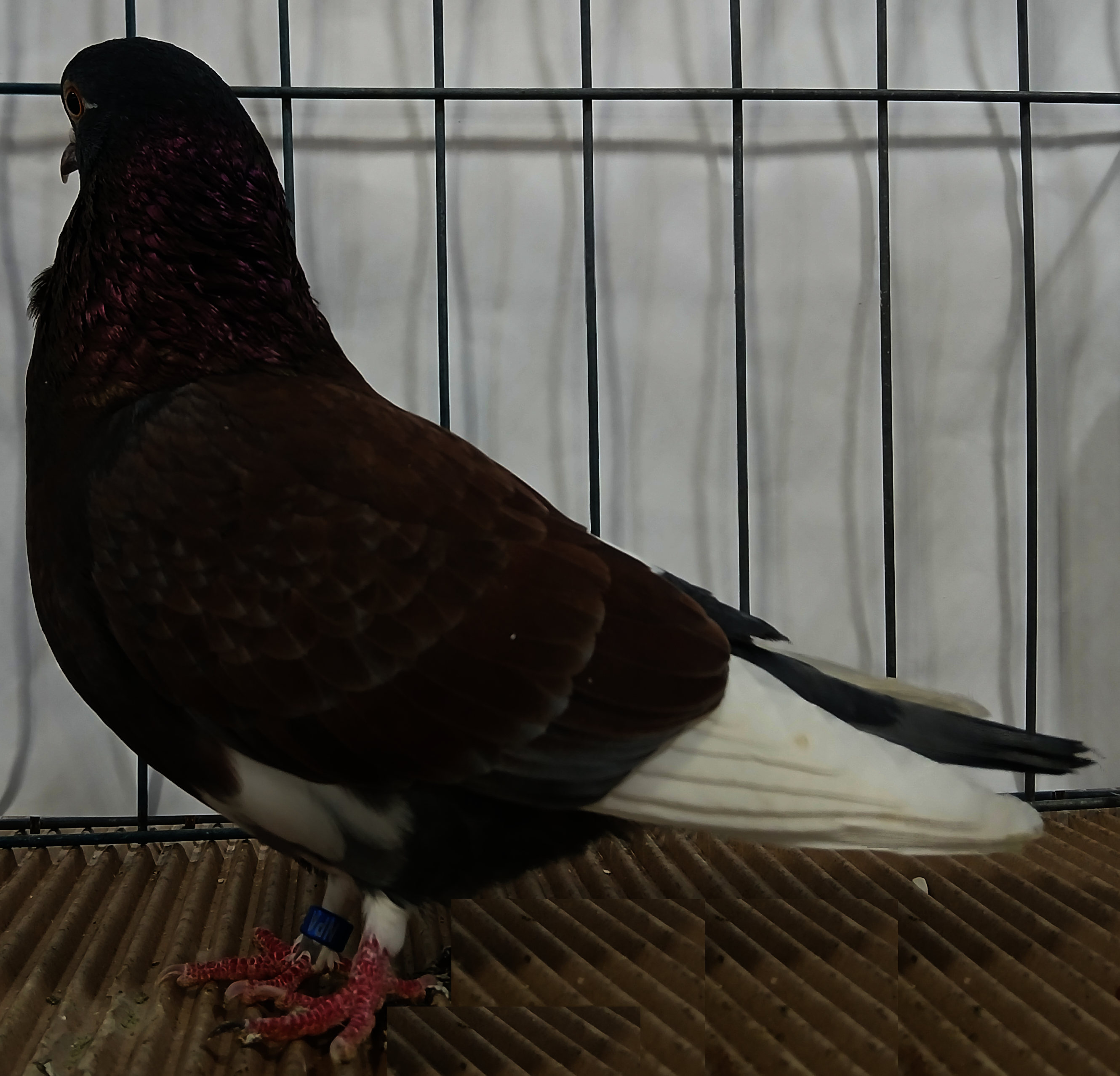
Red check NPA National 2026

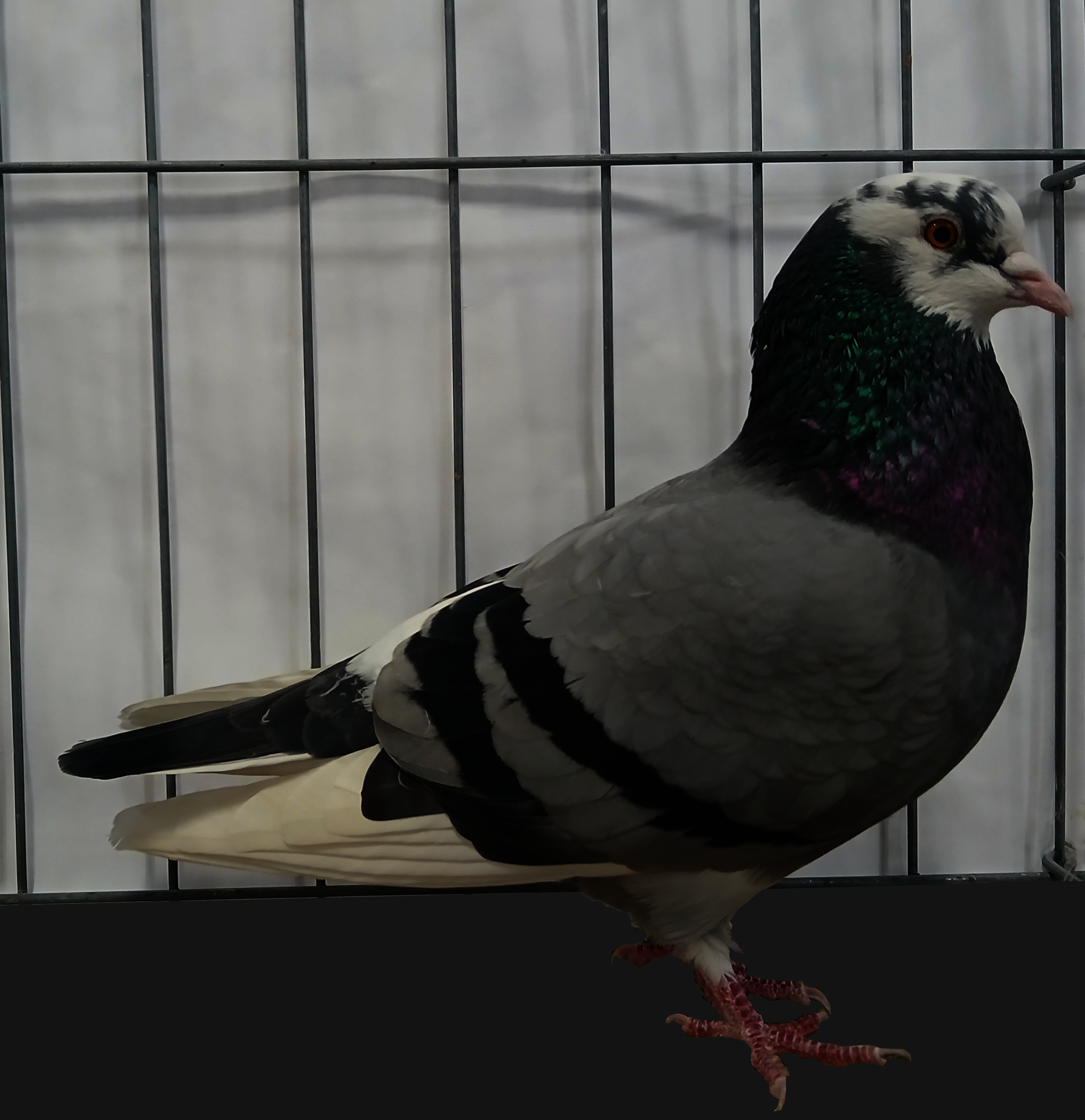
Blue bar NPA National 2026
