= Fancy pigeon =

Any breed of domestic pigeon

Fancy pigeon refers to any breed of domestic pigeon, which is a domesticated form of the wild rock dove (Columba livia). They are bred by pigeon fanciers for various traits relating to size, shape, color, and behavior, and often exhibited at pigeon shows, fairs and other livestock exhibits.

There are about 800 pigeon breeds; considering all regional varieties all over the world there may be 1100 breeds. The European list of fancy pigeons alone names about 500 breeds. No other domestic animal has branched out into such a variety of forms and colours.

Charles Darwin is known to have crossbred fancy pigeons, particularly the ice pigeon, to study variation within species, this work coming three years before his publication, On the Origin of Species.

== Pigeon showing ==
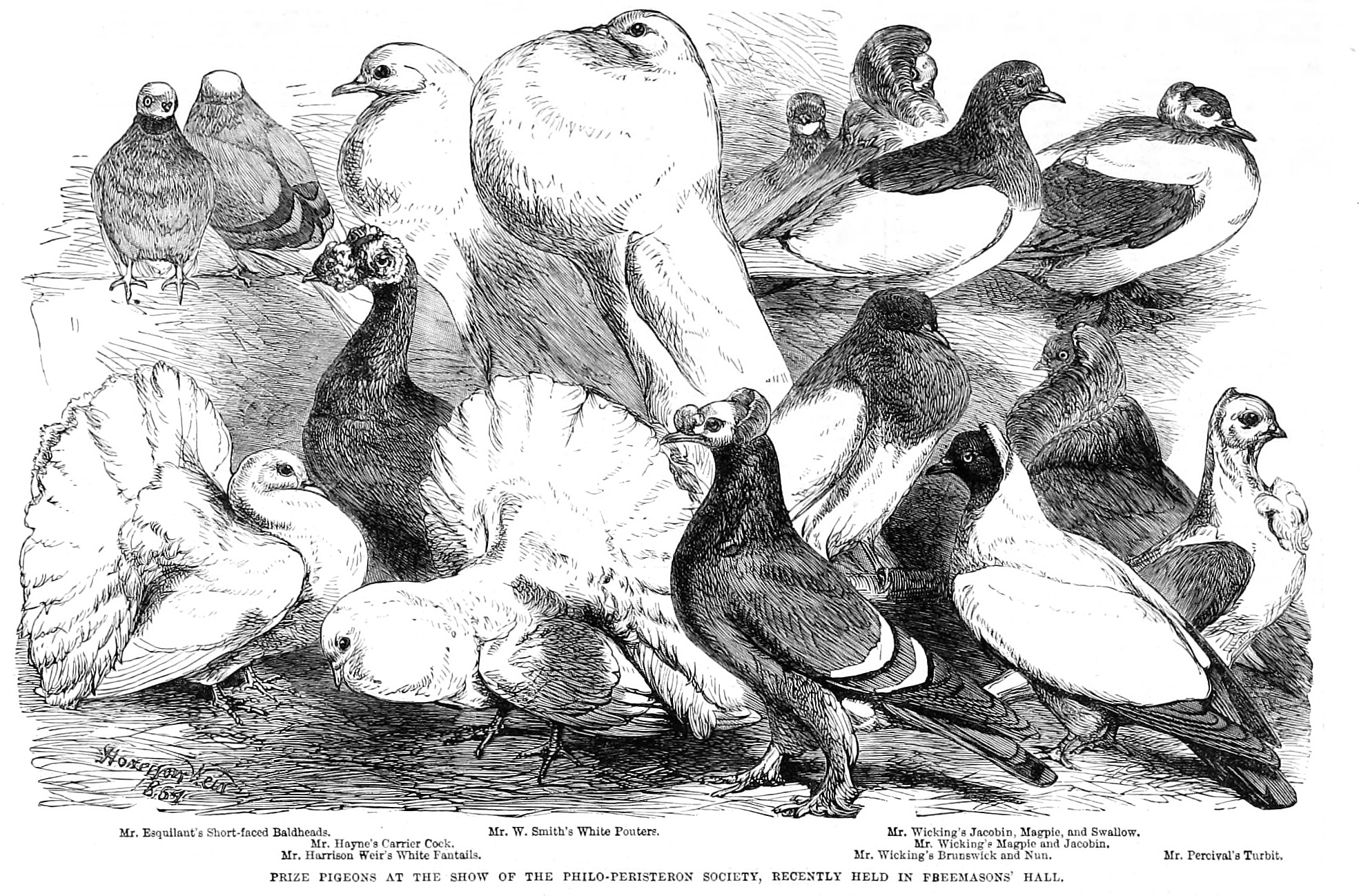
Pigeon breeds on display (1864)

Pigeon fanciers from many countries exhibit their birds at local, inter-state or national shows and compete against one another for prizes. One typical country show in Australia in 2008 had hundreds of pigeons on display and prizes for the winners. In England, the Philoperisteron Society conducted annual shows in the mid 1800s. There were also a London Columbarian Society. The extensive variations in the breeds attracted the attention of Charles Darwin and played a major role in developing ideas on evolution.

Some fanciers organize exhibitions exclusively for pigeons; one held in Blackpool run by the Royal Pigeon Racing Association is annually attended by about 25,000 people and generates around £80,000 profit, which is donated to charity.

The largest pigeon show is held in Nuremberg: the German National Pigeon Show, which had over 33,500 pigeons at the 2006 show.

In the United States, there are hundreds of local, state and national pigeon clubs that sponsor shows. The largest shows are the National Young Bird Show, held in Louisville, Kentucky in October, and the National Pigeon Association's Grand National, held in a different city each year and usually in January.

== Major breed families ==
This grouping system is adapted from Australian Fancy Pigeons National Book of Standards. Consideration was given to the new UK standards book which followed the German and European grouping. This version differs slightly from that of the European grouping; the following system is arbitrary and used solely for organizing breed articles until a grouping can be accepted worldwide.

=== Asian feather and voice pigeons ===
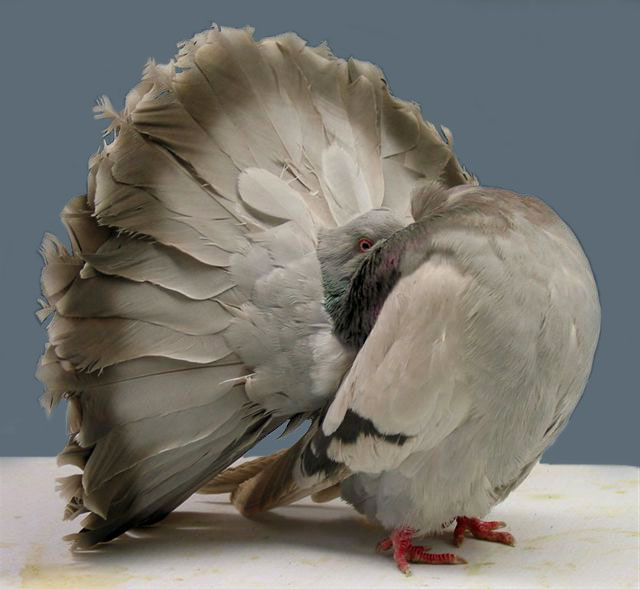
A Fantail attempting to make itself appear larger

This group includes breeds developed for extensive feathering that originated in the Asian region, as well as breeds cultivated for their trumpeting, or laughing, voice.

- Fantail
- Frillback
- Jacobin
- Lahore
- Trumpeter
- English Trumpeter

=== Colour pigeons ===
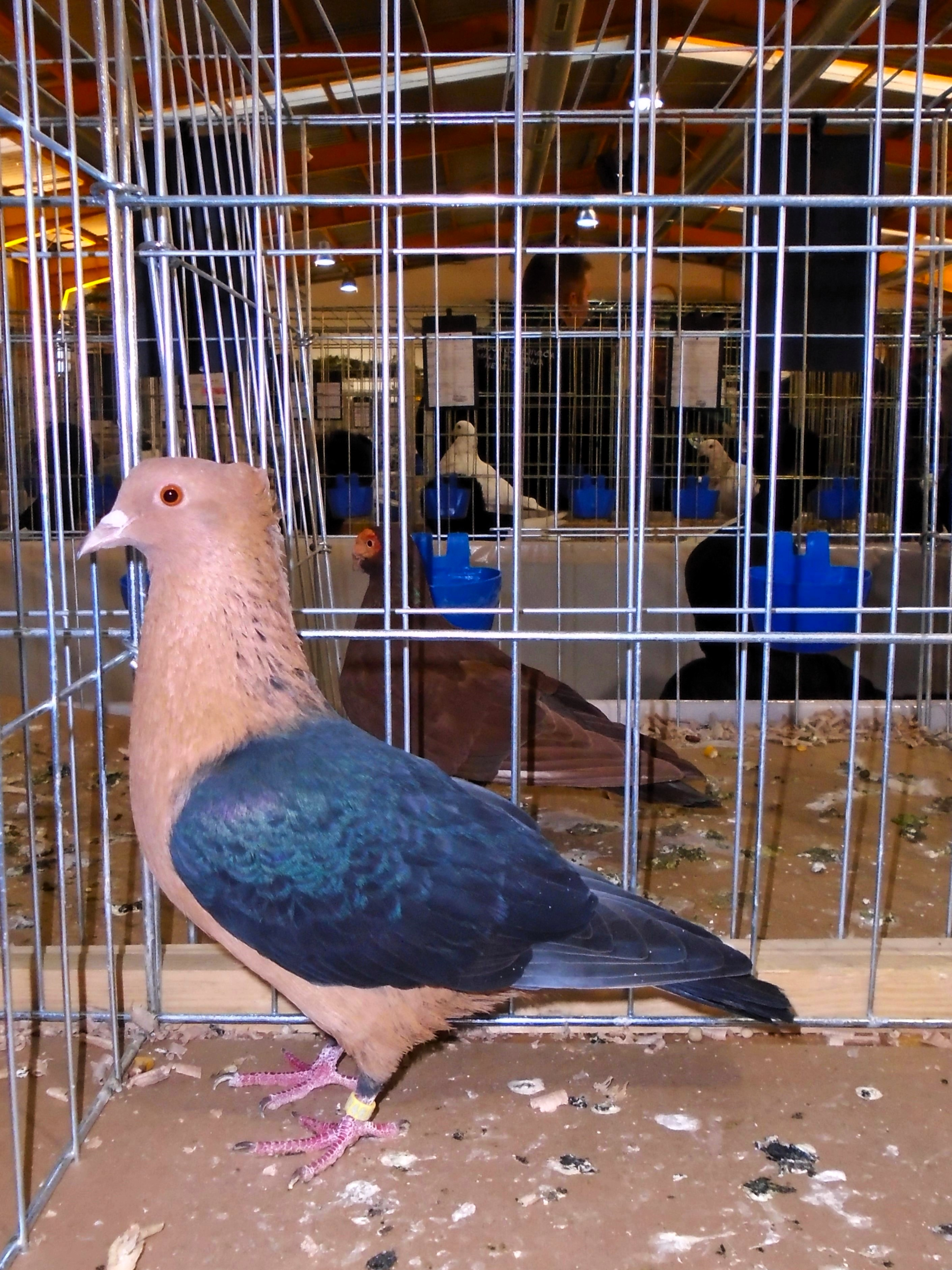
An Archangel pigeon at an exhibition

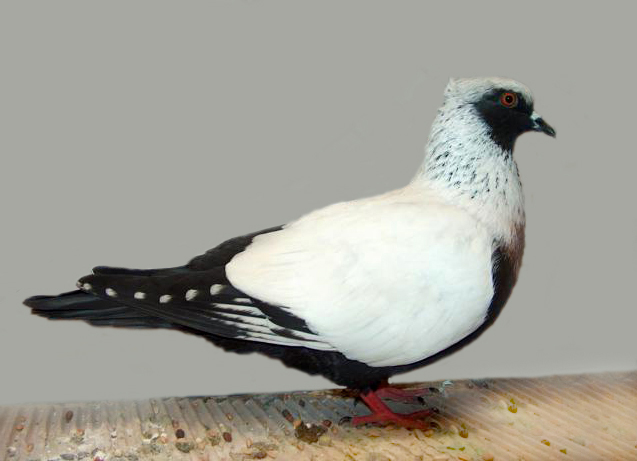
Danish Suabian

Most of these pigeons originate in Germany, and are sometimes listed as German Toys. There are many varieties, with a wide selection of colours and markings.

- Archangel pigeon
- Danish Suabian
- Saxon Field Pigeon
- Starling
- Swallow
- Thuringen Field Pigeon
- Ice Pigeon

=== Frills and Owls ===
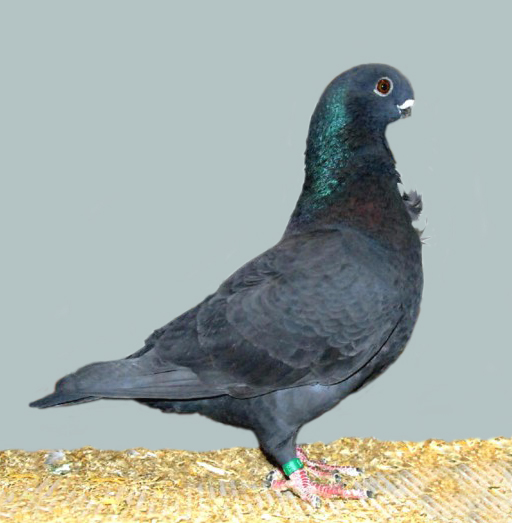
An African Owl

The frills and owls are a breed group with short- to medium-length beaks. The "frill" is an area on the neck where the feathers grow inversed compared to the surrounding plumage.

- Aachen Lacquer Shield Owl
- African Owl
- Chinese Owl
- Italian Owl
- Old German Owl
- Old Dutch Owl
- Oriental Frill
  - Old Fashioned Oriental Frill
- Turbit

=== Homer and Hen Pigeons ===
==== Homing pigeons ====
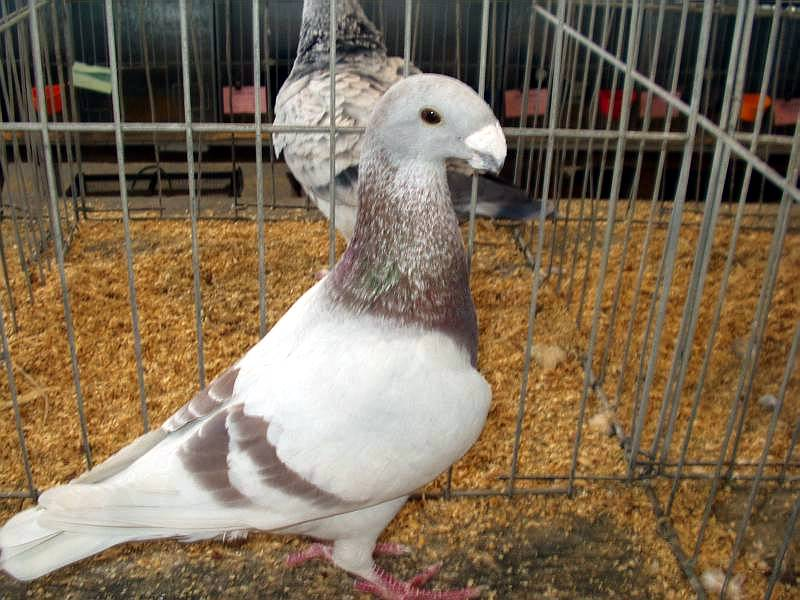
German Beauty Homer

This group includes breeds originally developed for their homing ability, and includes show-type racing pigeons.

- American Show Racer
- Dragoon
- English Carrier
- German Beauty Homer
- Homing pigeon

=== Pouters and Croppers ===
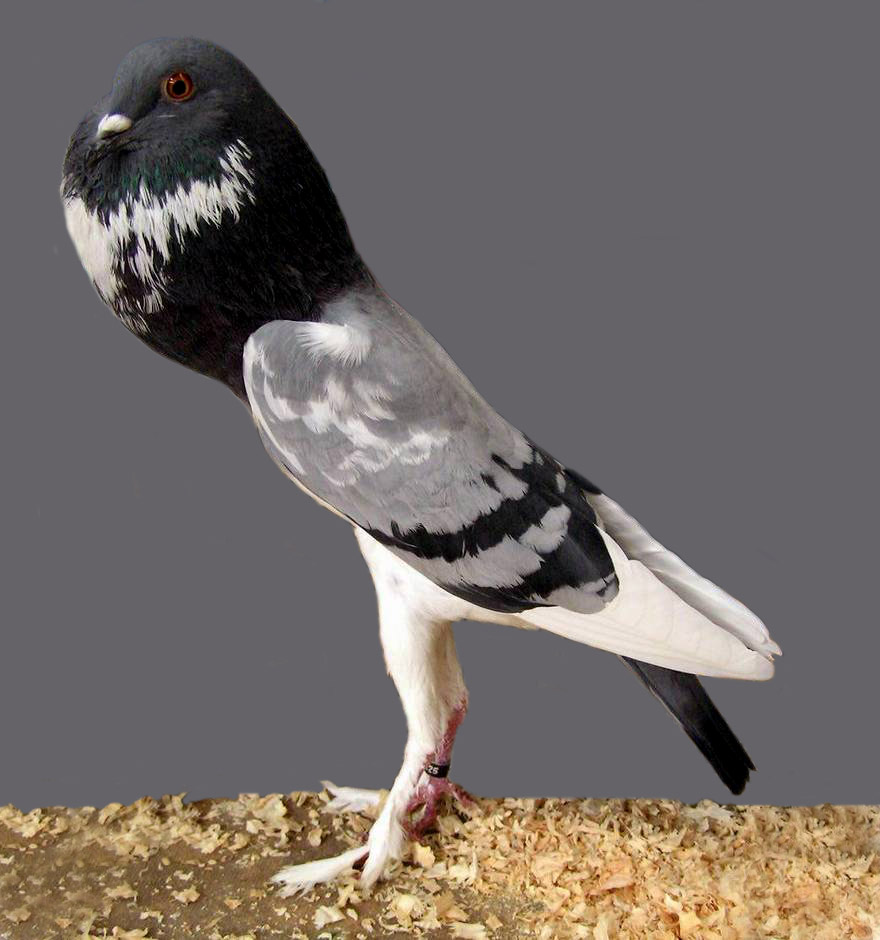
A Pigmy Pouter

This group includes breeds developed for the ability to inflate their crops.

- English Pouter
- Brunner Pouter
- Gaditano Pouter
- Holle Cropper
- Horseman Pouter
- Norwich Cropper
- Pigmy Pouter
- Pouter
- Voorburg shield cropper
- Old German Croppers
- Magpi pouter

=== Exhibition Tumblers ===
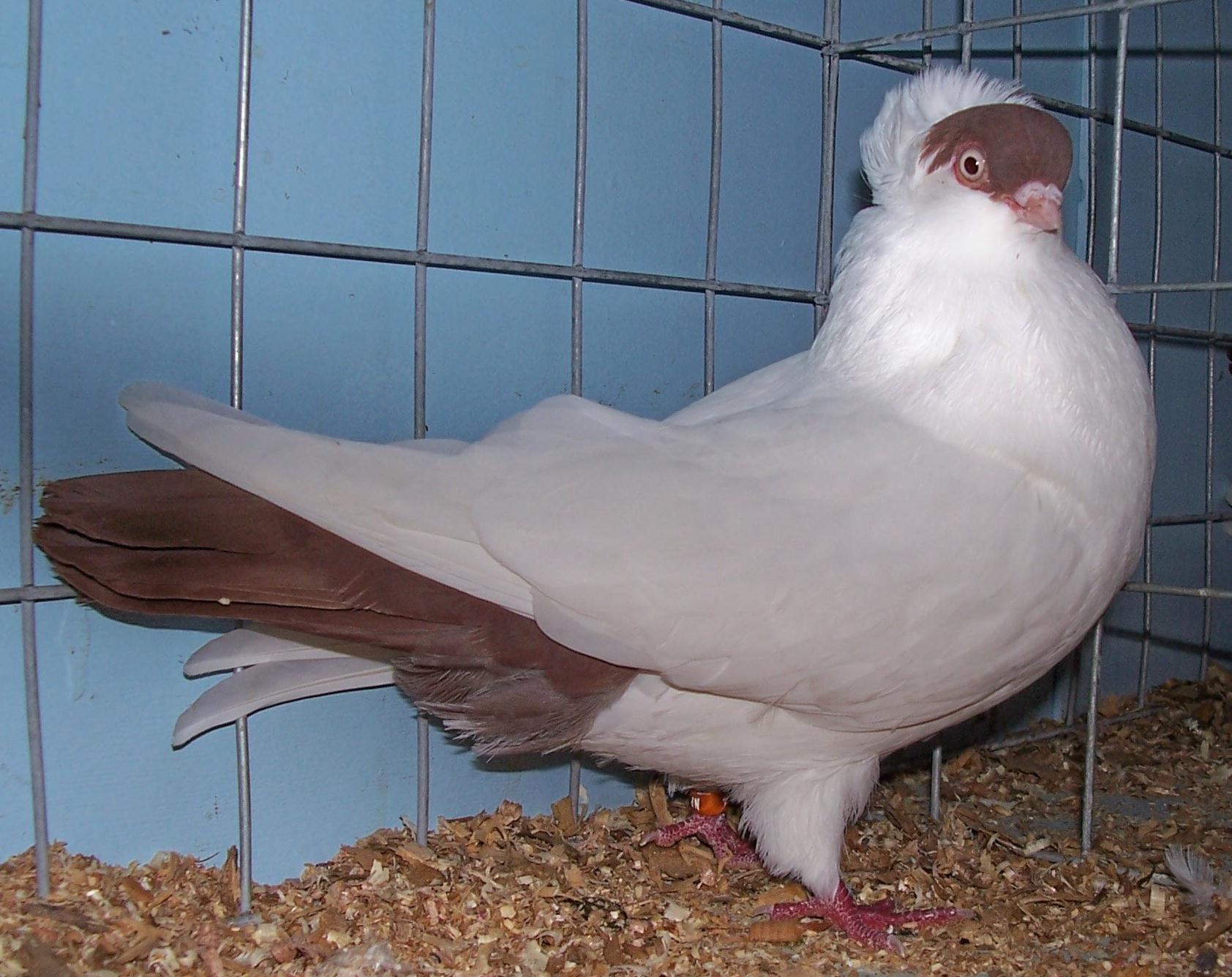
Crested Helmet

This group originally consisted of flying/tumbler breeds, but has now been refined to include only purely ornamental/exhibition breeds.

- English Long-faced Tumbler
- English Short-faced Tumbler
- Helmet
- English Magpie
- Nun
- Budapest Short-faced Tumbler

=== Flying Tumblers and Highfliers ===
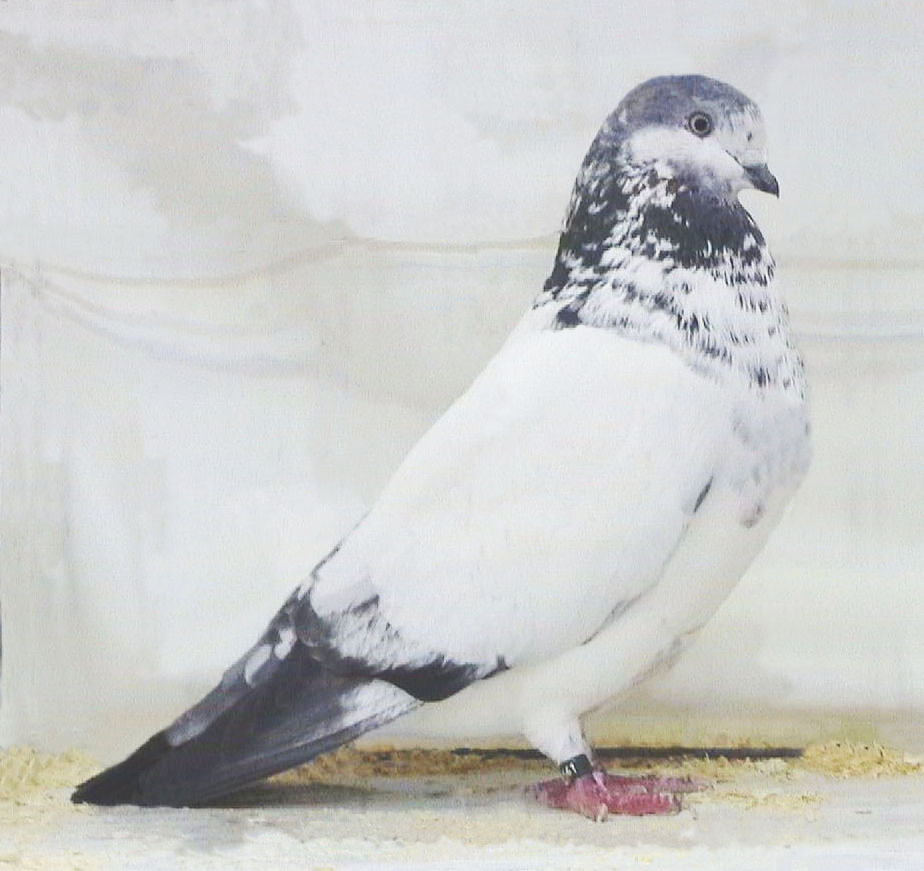
Tippler (Light print)

This group is dual purpose in that its members can be shown, but also retain acrobatic or sporting ability and can therefore be used in flying competitions. Flying tumbler varieties belong in this group. Although many varieties in this grouping have become primarily show varieties, they are still expected to display characteristics of performing birds.

- American Roller
- Armenian Tumbler
- Australian Performing Tumbler
- Danzig Highflyer
- Donek
- Roller
- Tippler
- Dutch Helmet

=== Utility pigeons ===
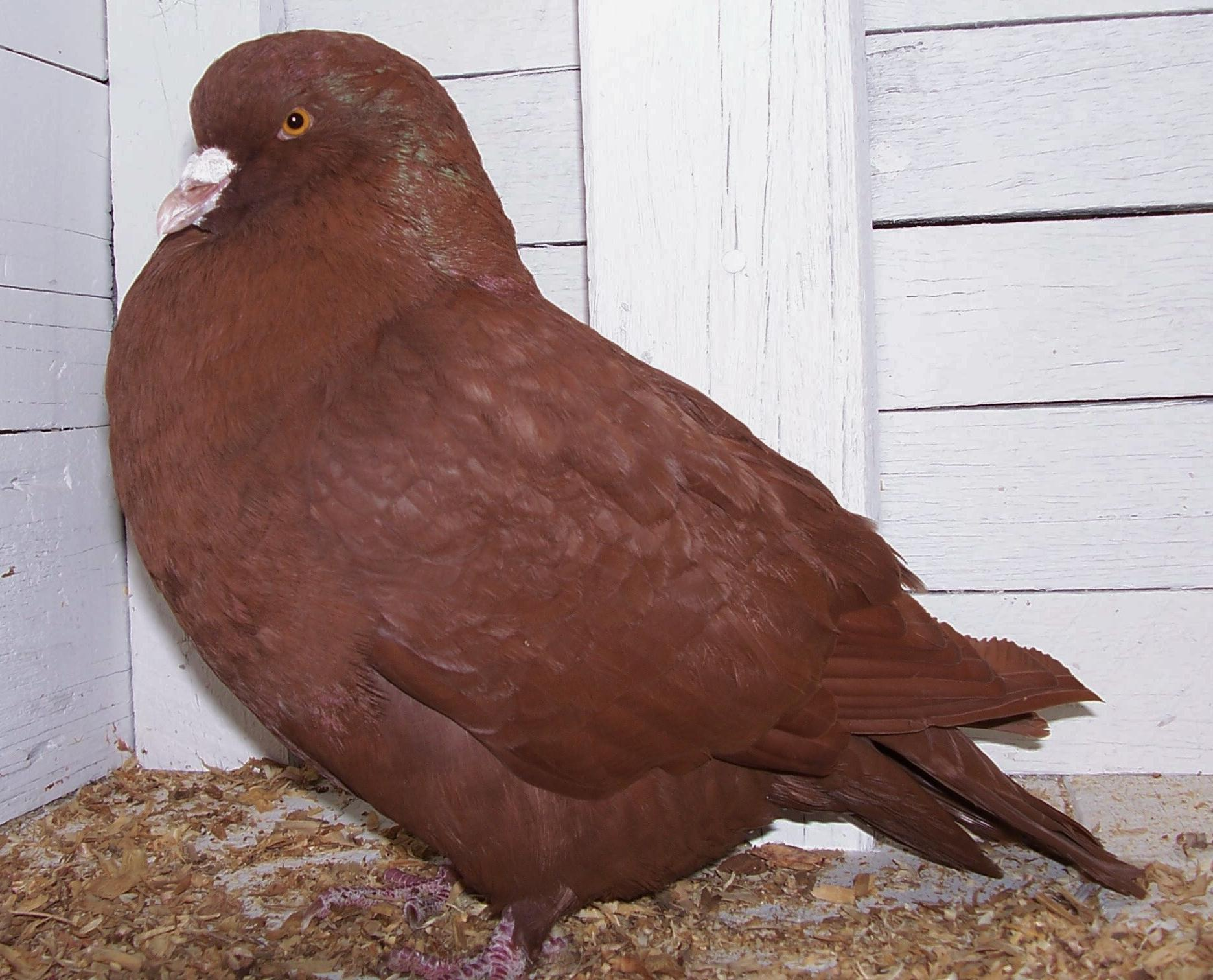
A red Carneau

This group includes breeds originally developed as sources of meat.

- Carneau
- French Mondain
- King pigeon
- American Giant Runt
- Strasser pigeon

== See also ==
- Domestic pigeon
- Homing pigeon
- List of pigeon breeds
