= Tumbler pigeons =

Group of pigeon breeds

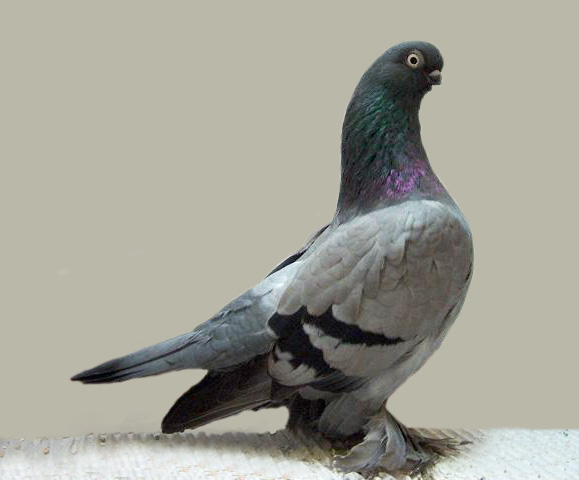
Berlin Short-faced Tumbler

Tumbler pigeons are varieties of domesticated pigeons that are descendants of the rock dove that have been selected for their ability to tumble or roll over backwards in flight.

This ability has been known in domesticated breeds of pigeons for centuries. In Wendell Levi's book The Pigeon, reference is made to pigeons with this tumbling ability existing in India before the year 1590. Charles Darwin, in his book The Origin of Species, makes reference to the Short-faced Tumbler which was a popular breed during his lifetime, and still can be found exhibited at pigeon shows today. It's believed to have been a survival tactic to avoid aerial attacks by other birds. There are many different breeds that have descended from the original tumbler stocks. Some of the more popular breeds today include:

- American Flying Tumbler
- Anekal Rekdhar Tumbler
- Armenian Tumbler
- Australian Performing Tumbler
- Australian Saddleback Tumbler
- Berlin Short-faced Tumbler
- Berlin Long-faced Tumbler
- Budapest Short-faced Tumbler
- English Long-faced Tumbler
- English Short-faced Tumbler
- Felégyhaza Tumbler
- Indian Tumblers
- Iranian Highflying Tumbler
- Komorner Tumbler
- Krasnodar Tumbler
- Limerick Tumblers
- Muffed Tumblers
- Portuguese Tumbler
- Old Style Muffed Tumbler
- Shiraz Tumbler
- Vienna long-faced tumbler
- West of England Tumbler

== See also ==
American Pigeon Journal September 1949 American Pigeon Journal Dec. 1949

- Roller (pigeon)
- Birmingham Roller
- List of pigeon breeds
