= Portuguese tumbler =

Breed of pigeon

Portuguese Tumbler
- The black form.
- Conservation status: Common
- Country of origin: Portugal
- Distribution: wide
- Standard: yes
- Type: Show
- Use: Show

Traits
- Weight: Male: 9 oz; Female: 8 oz
- Height: Male: 10 inches; Female: 10 inches
- Egg color: white
- Crest type: none
- Color: black, ash red, brown, & all modifiers
- Lifespan: 12 years
- clutch size: 2
- head: cube (rounded corners)
- marking: Any
- eye color: pearl
- height: 8 inches

Classification
- Australian: none
- European: Tumbler
- US: Tumbler, Rollers, & Highflyers

The Portuguese Tumbler is a breed of domesticated pigeon. It originates from Portugal.

== Origin ==
The Portuguese Tumbler was developed in Portugal around 1900. As with all domesticated pigeons, it is derived from the rock dove (Columba Livia), being further developed using selective breeding techniques. Its most impressive deviation from the rock dove is its form, color range, and style of flight, flying high in tight circles.

== History ==
The breed was developed from English Short-Faced Tumblers and Tipplers, accounting for their flying style. An official standard was adopted in 1926, recognizing that the breed had diverged significantly from its foundation stocks. The original standard stood unaltered until 1953. At that time, the breed was most popular in the Lisbon area, but has moved to Coruche where the national exhibitions have been held since 1980. The breed has become a show breed since that time and is now known more for its colors and form rather than flying style.

== Description ==
The Portuguese Tumbler is a small, short-bodied pigeon with a low-slung stance and an upright posture. Its length from beak to tail tip is approximately 10 inches (25 centimeters). Adult cocks weigh between 7 and 9 ounces (200 to 250 grams); hens and young cocks are lighter, with young hens weighing about one ounce less. They have a fine, nearly horizontal beak, pearl eyes, small eye ceres and narrow eye rings, and cube-like head shape (with rounded edges), The wings are carried on the tail, ending just before the tip of the tail. There are 12 tail feathers, that are held tightly, appearing to be only one and a half feathers wide. These Tumblers are renowned for their wide array of color and marking, including rather unusual combinations rarely found in other Tumbler breeds. The colors are found in solid as well as bicolored and even tricolored mixes. Particularly noteworthy are the birds with variations of bronze plumage.

== Distribution ==
The breed is now seen in many parts of the world, and is recognized by the European Association as breed #921. By 1997, nearly 270 were exhibited in Germany. It is recognized in Great Britain and the United States by each country's National Pigeon Association. It was initially imported into America in 2003, and by 2020, 123 were exhibited at a major show.

== Gallery ==
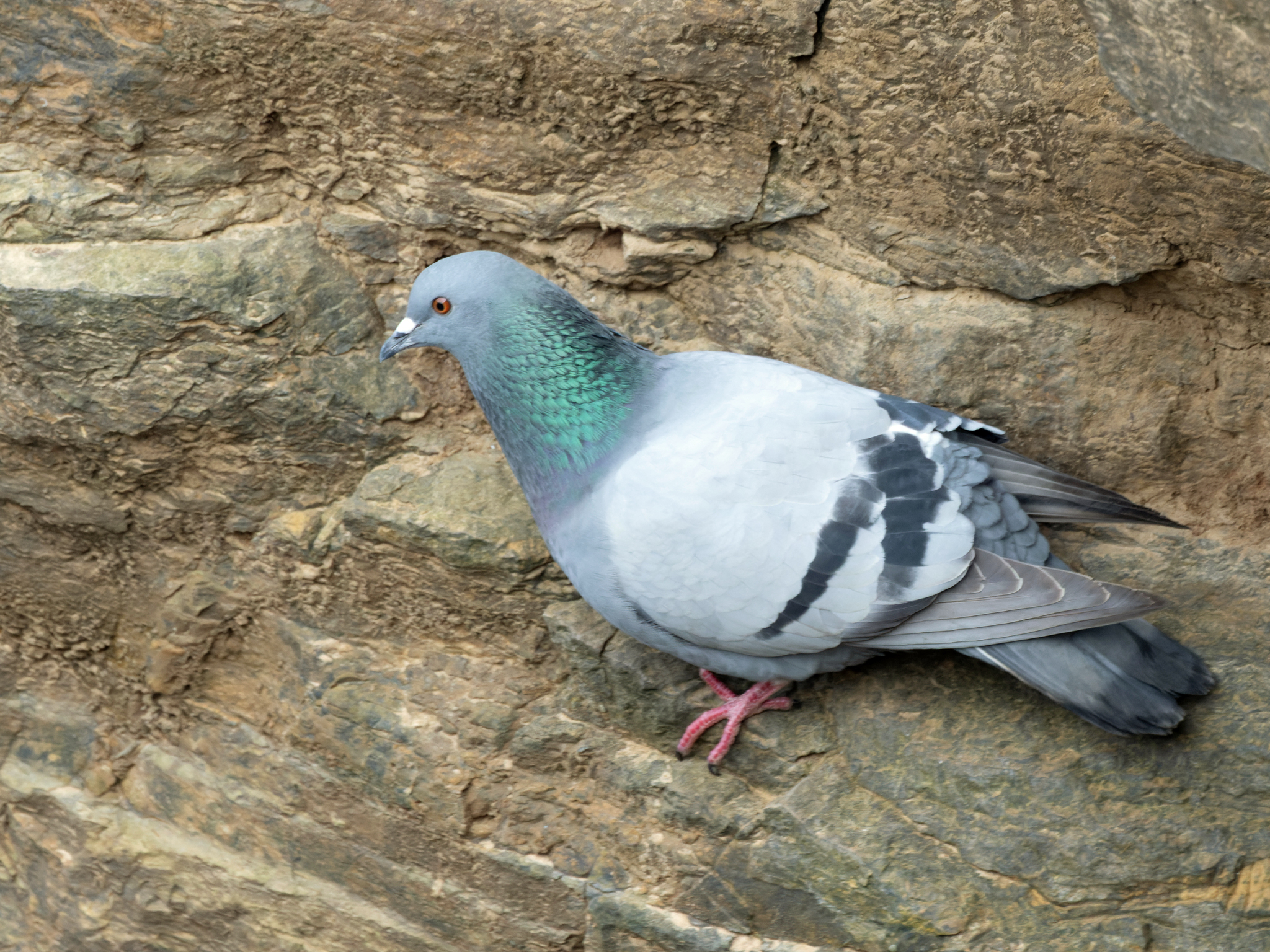
rock dove

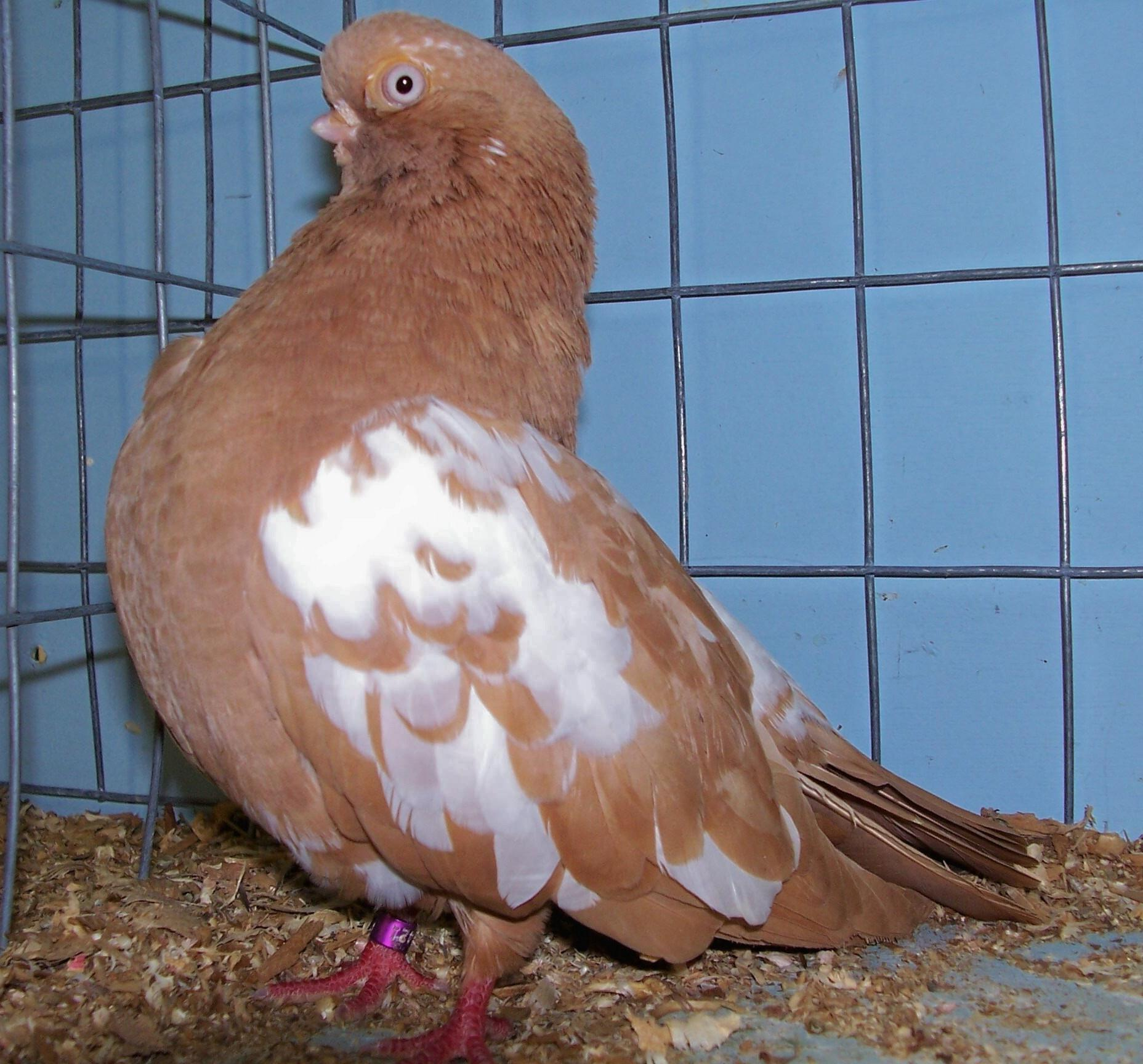
English short faced tumbler

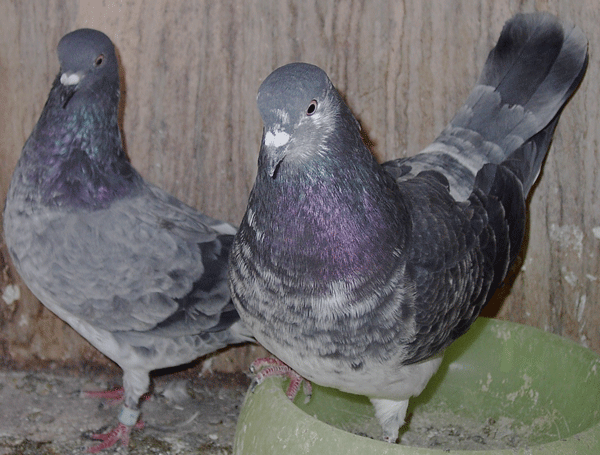
Tippler

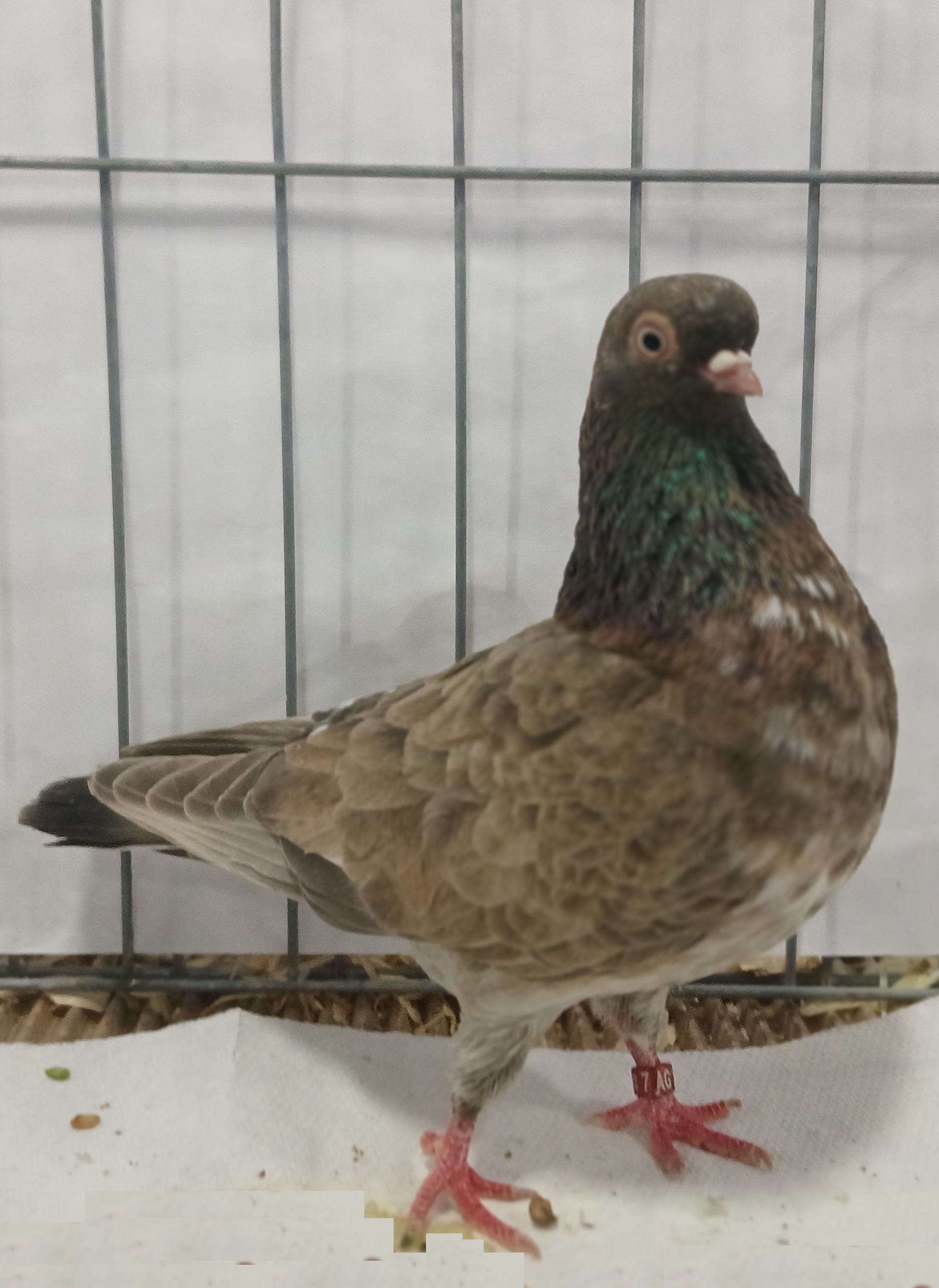
Portuguese Tumbler dark almond

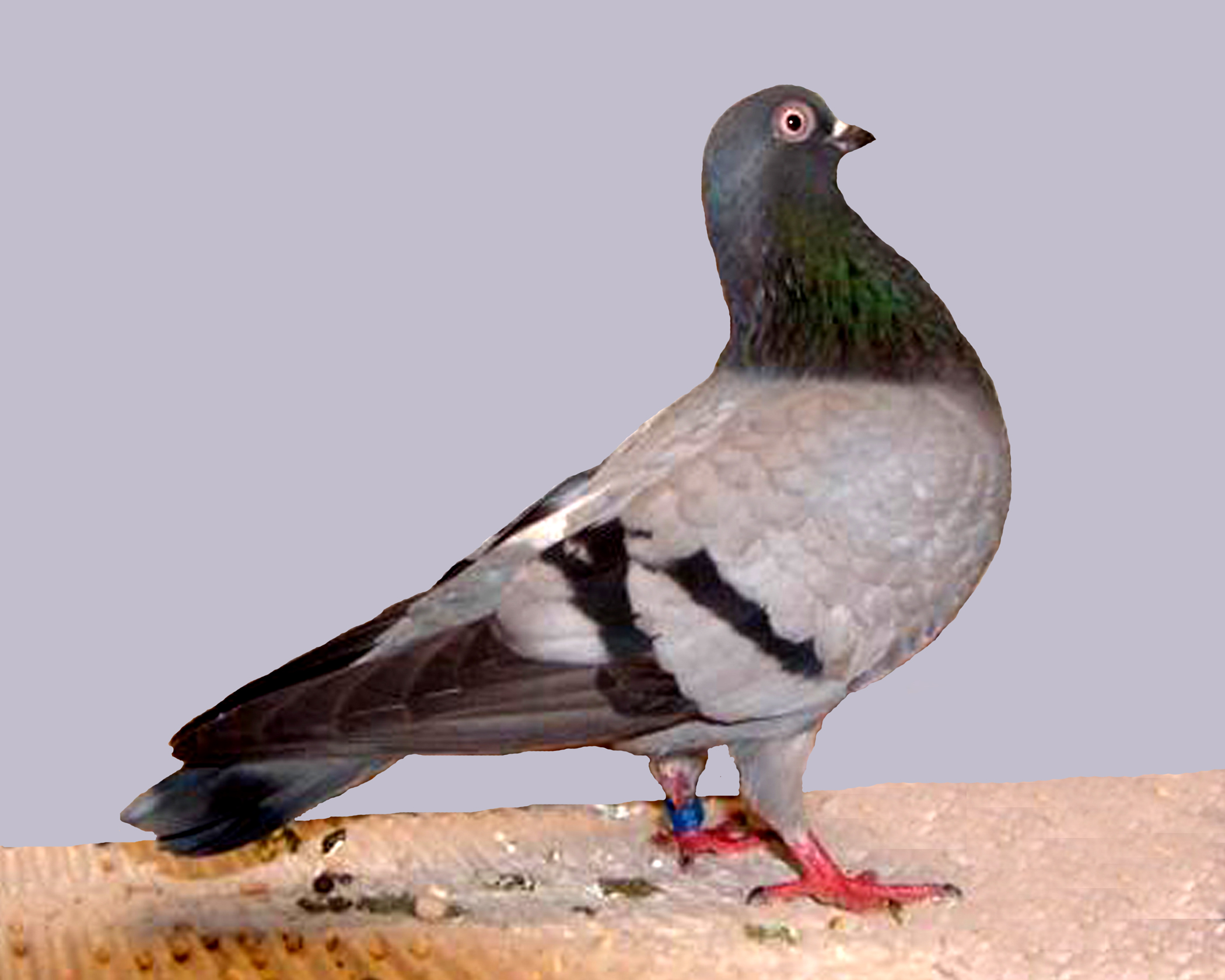
Portuguese Tumbler blue bar

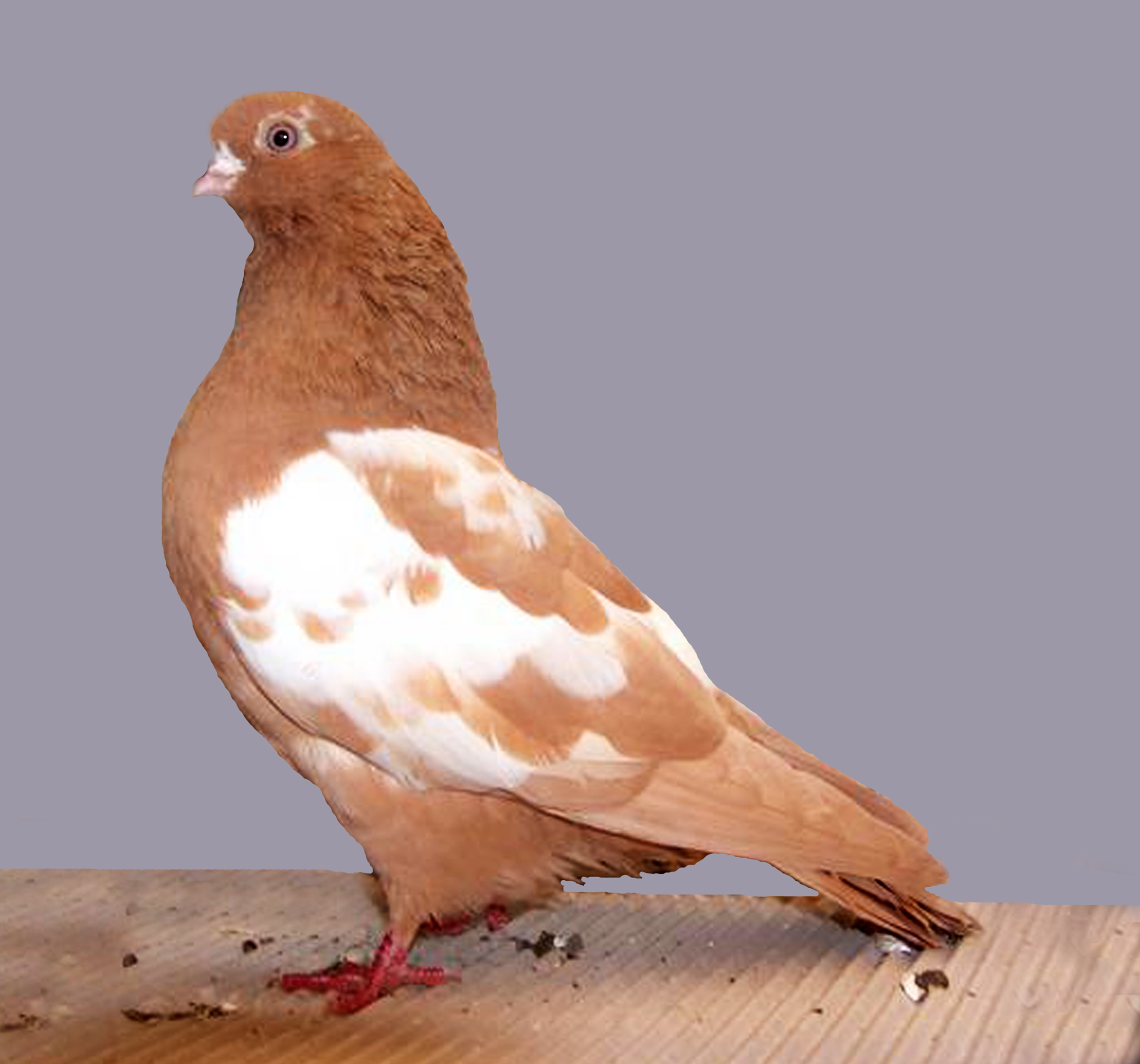
Portuguese Tumbler yellow agate

Portuguese Tumbler tigered

== See Also ==
- Purebred Pigeon (Portuguese Tumbler Special) 2024 #2
- List of pigeon breeds
- Pigeon keeping
  - Pigeon Diet
  - Pigeon Housing

=== Standard Elements ===
- Origin: Portugal
- Group type; Tumbler
  - Size; small 9 ounces
  - Head; cubed with round edges
  - Eyes; pearl
  - Beak; small, short, fine
  - Neck; Short and thick at base
  - Breast; Broad well rounded
  - Back; broad tapering quickly
  - Wings: lying on back almost reaching end of tail
  - Tail:short maintaining the angle of the back
  - Legs; short
  - Colors; Blue, Black, Brown, Ash red and modifiers
  - Undesirable Elements; horizontal stance, and wings carried below tail
