= Australian Performing Tumbler =

Breed of pigeon

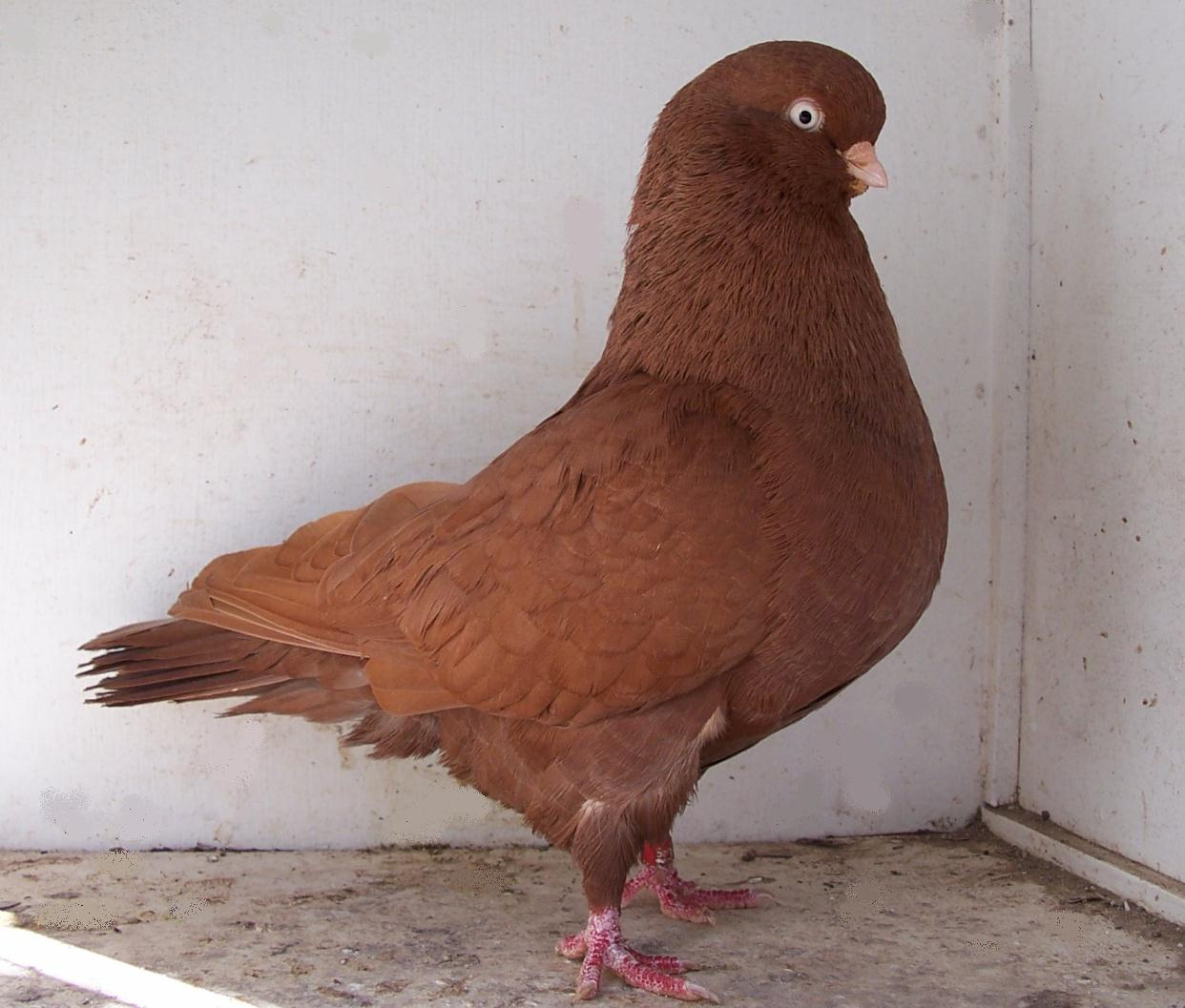
- Conservation status: Common
- Country of origin: Australia

Classification
- US Breed Group: Tumbler, Rollers & Highflyers
- EE Breed Group: none

The Australian Performing Tumbler (APT) is a breed of fancy pigeon.

== Origin ==
This breed of pigeon was developed through selective breeding in Australia from originally imported Tumbler Pigeon stocks. The APT has been a popular flying variety in the past due to the spinning/rolling action typical of the Tumbler varieties. Wendell Levi discusses the tumbling performance and several early Tumbler breeds in his book The Pigeon. Earlier versions of the APT were quite good little performers in the air. Nowadays however the breed is maintained mainly for exhibition purposes having first been developed for the show pen in the State of New South Wales. The APT is a very popular show variety in the Australian States of New South Wales and Queensland, where the largest number of breeders of this variety can be found. A show standard was adopted by the Australian National Pigeon Association in 1991 and has now been upgraded further thanks largely to the efforts of Mr Max Van Geet and Mr Vaughan Kelly

== Description ==
The APT is medium faced, pearl eyed, clean legged and quite reminiscent of the old style English Long Faced Tumbler as seen in Levi's book. It has a rounded head, short cobby body and a selection of classic tumbler colors such as recessive red, kite and almond. A quiet variety that is able to be used as a foster parent for other breeds increases the APT's usefulness.

== Basic Needs ==
- Pigeon Diet
- Pigeon Housing

== See also ==
- List of pigeon breeds
