= West of England Tumbler =

Breed of pigeon

The West of England Tumbler is a breed of fancy pigeon developed over many years of selective breeding. West of England Tumblers, along with other varieties of domesticated pigeons, are all descendants of the rock dove (Columba livia). The breed was developed in England in Bristol and the surrounding West Country in the late 19th and early 20th centuries.

== Gallery ==
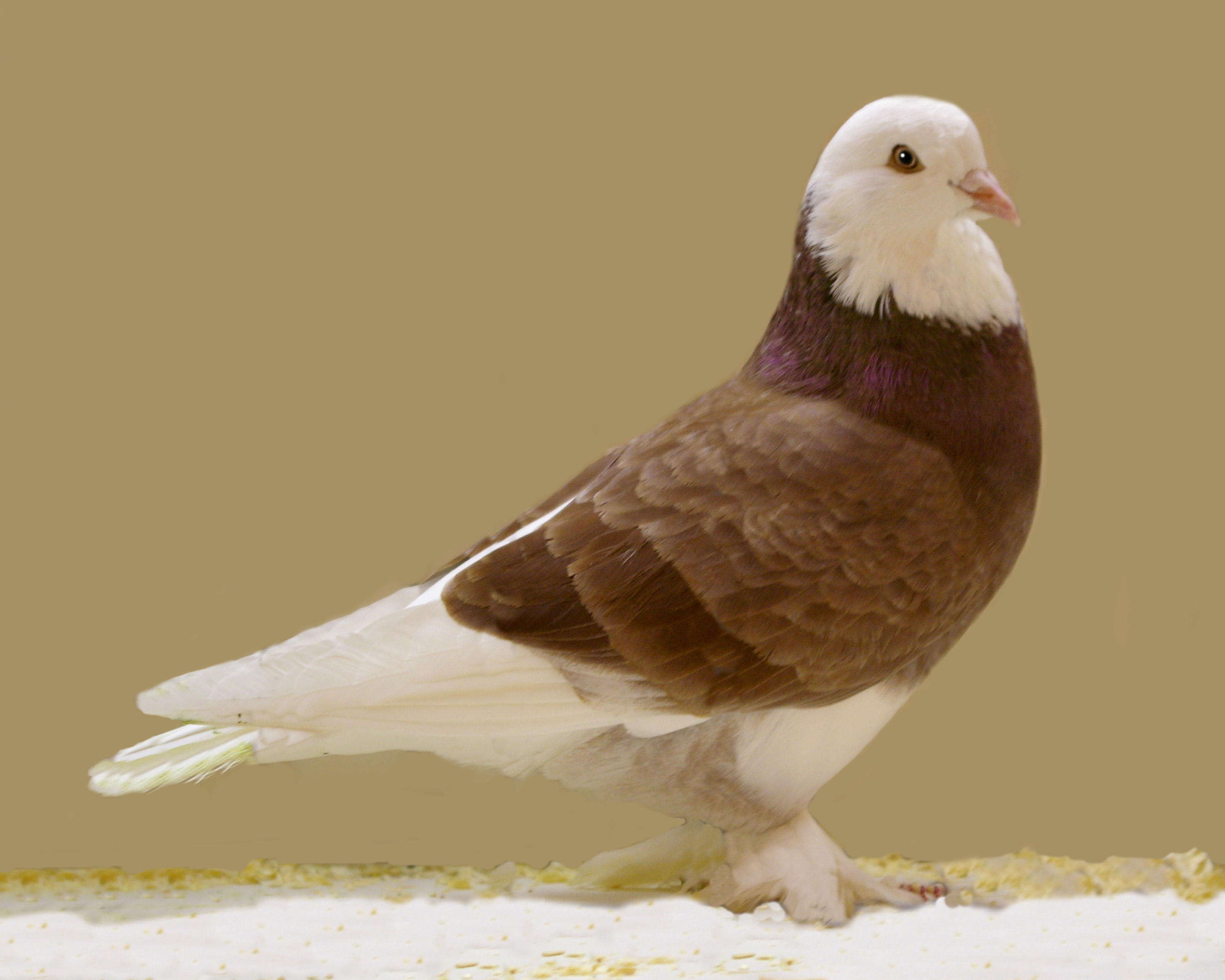

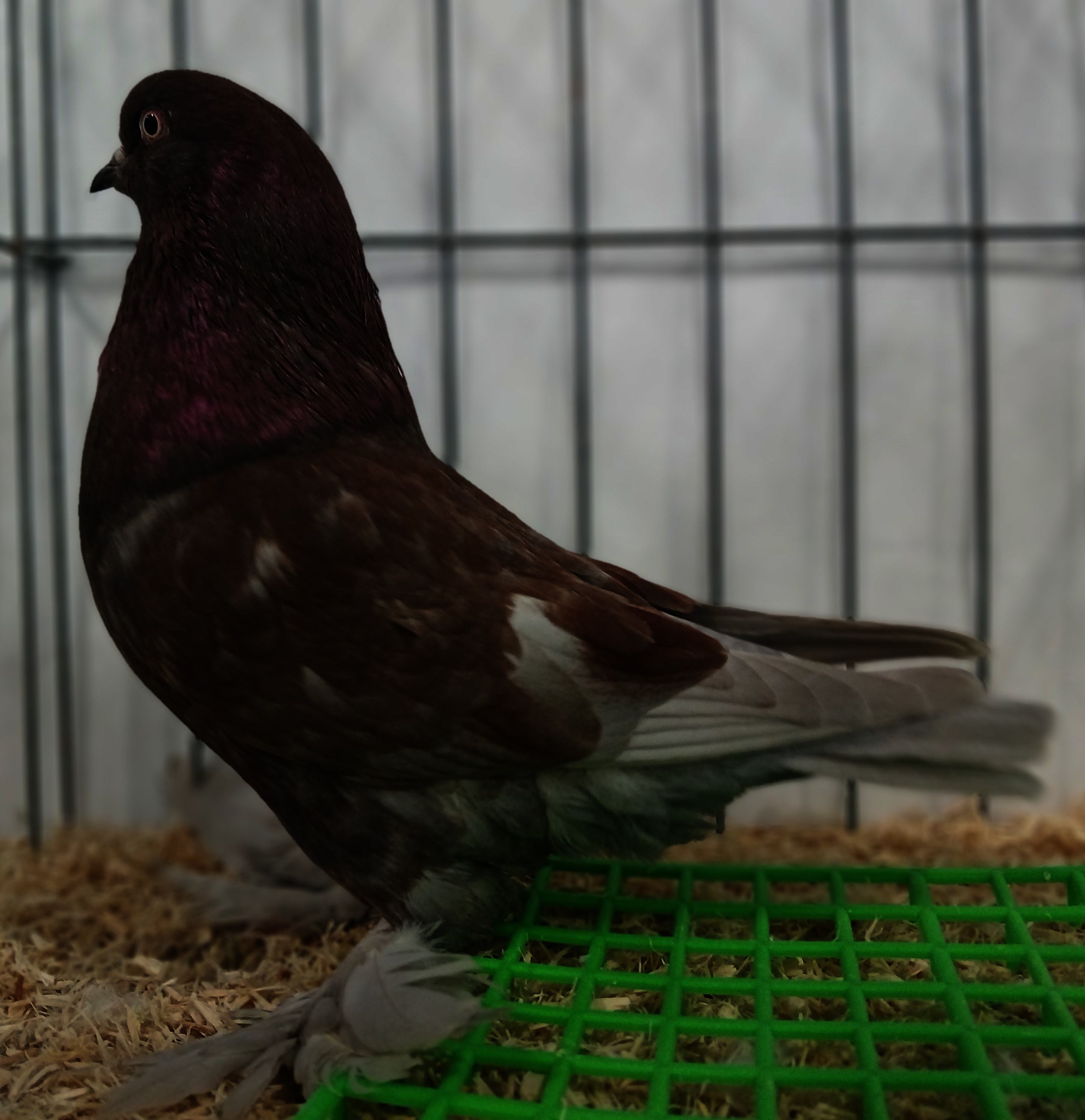

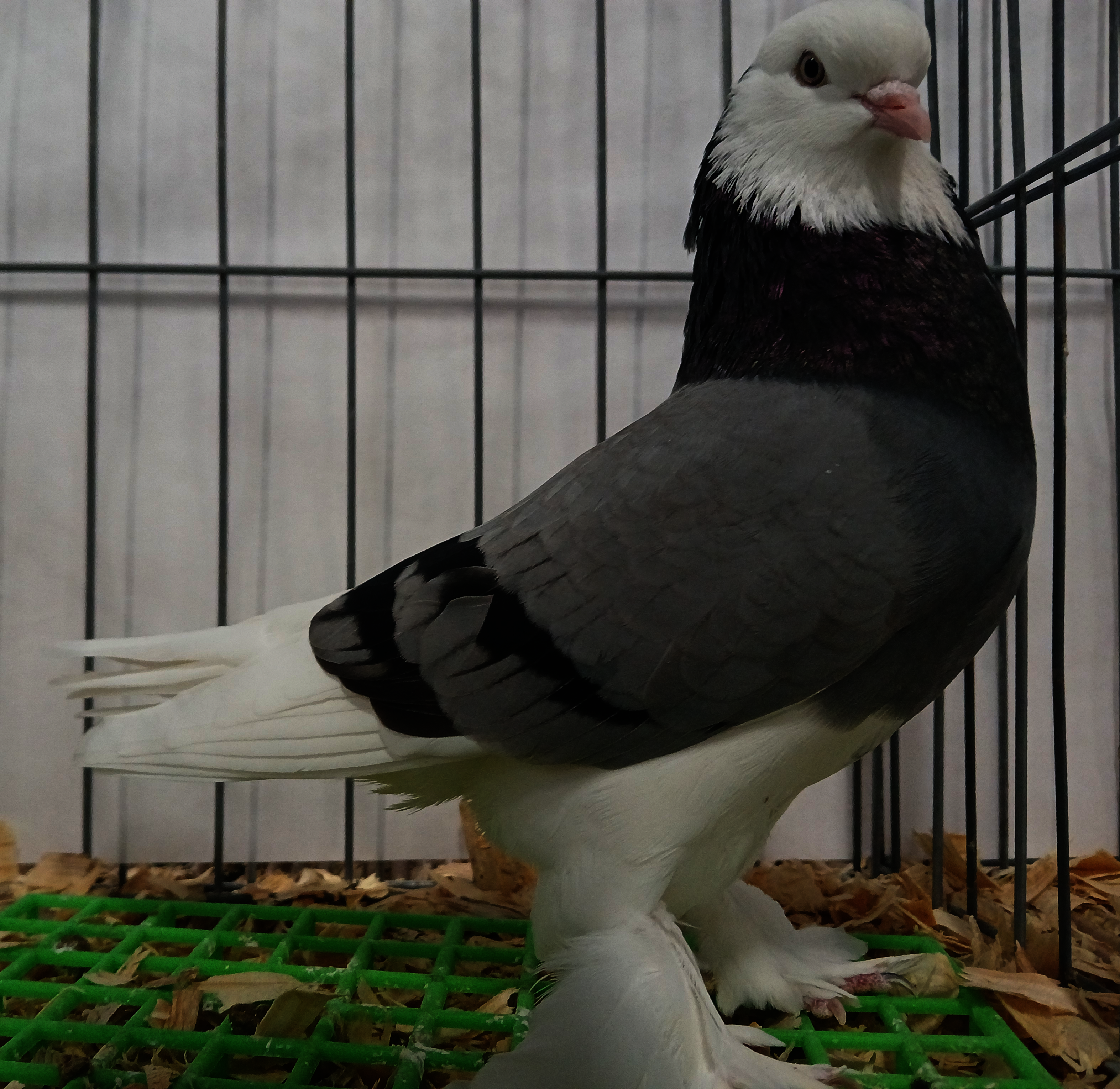

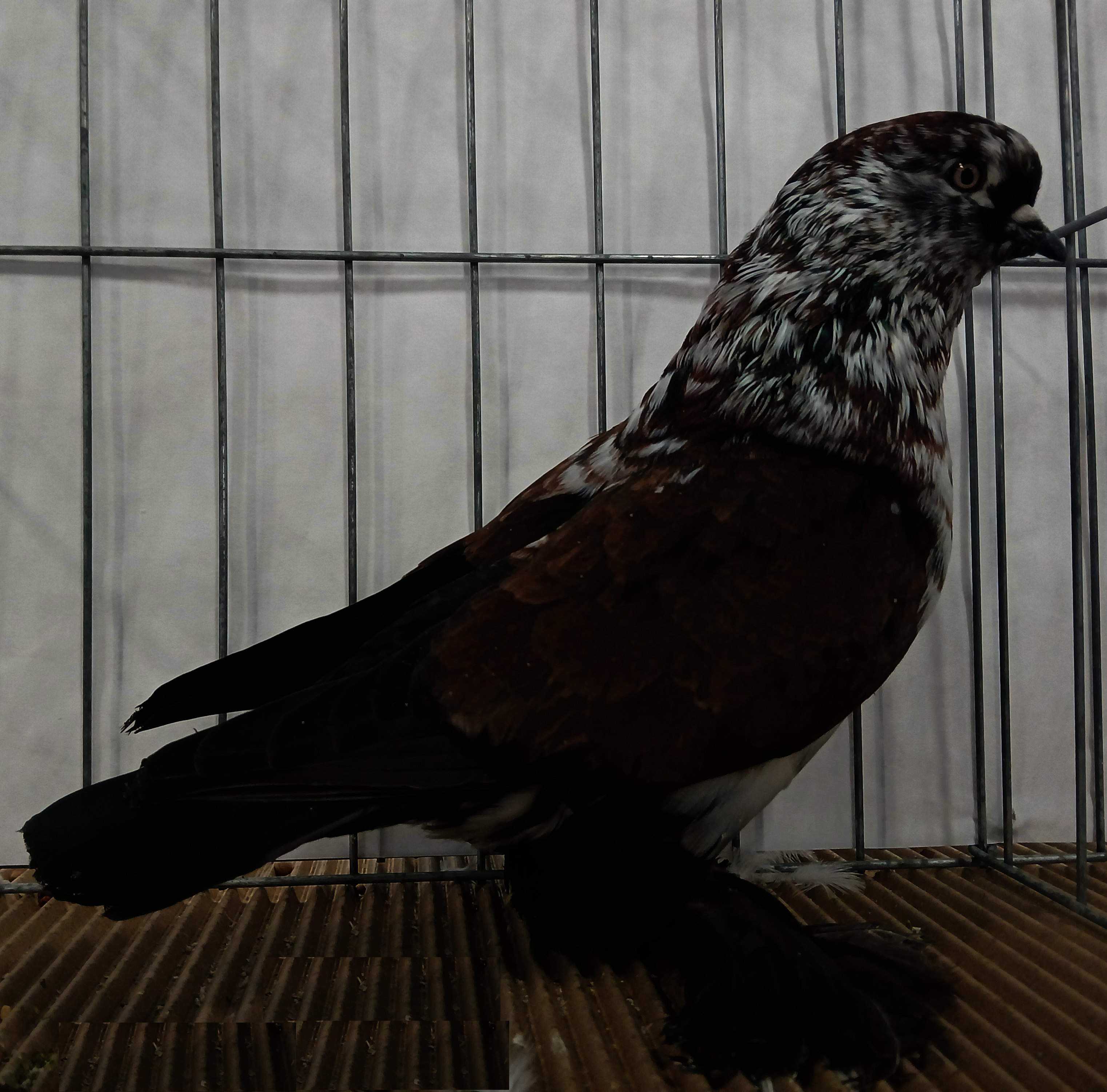

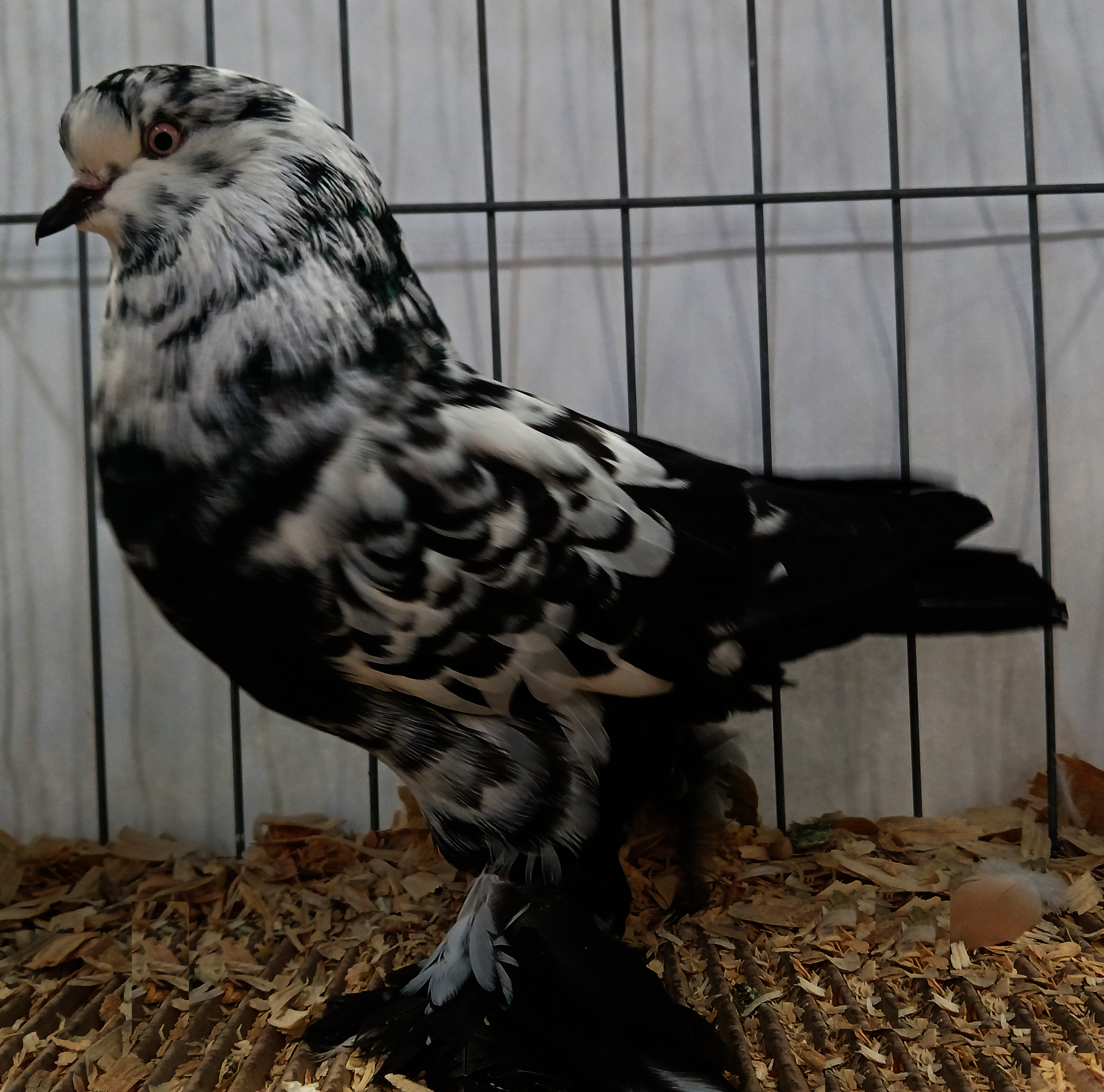

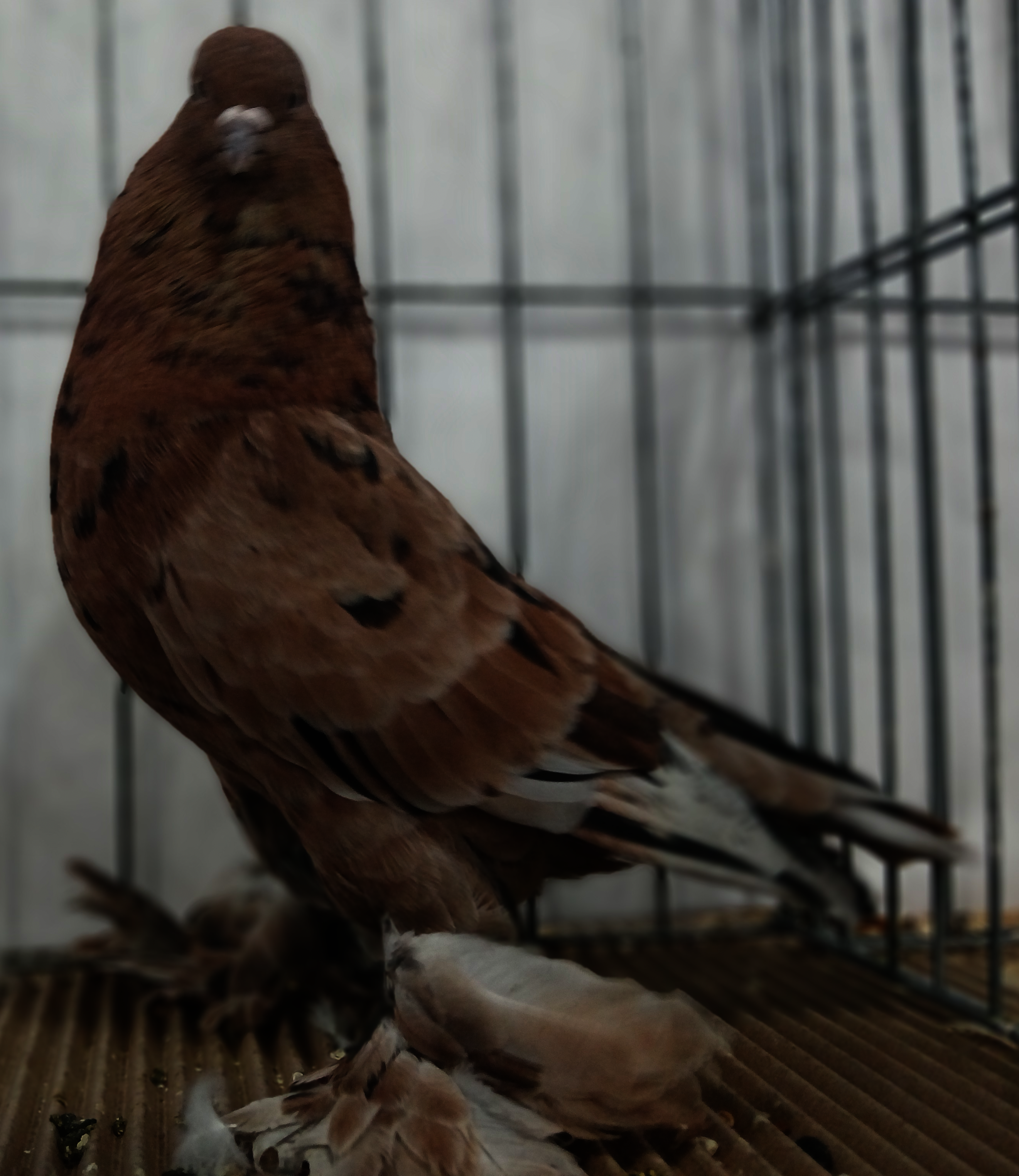

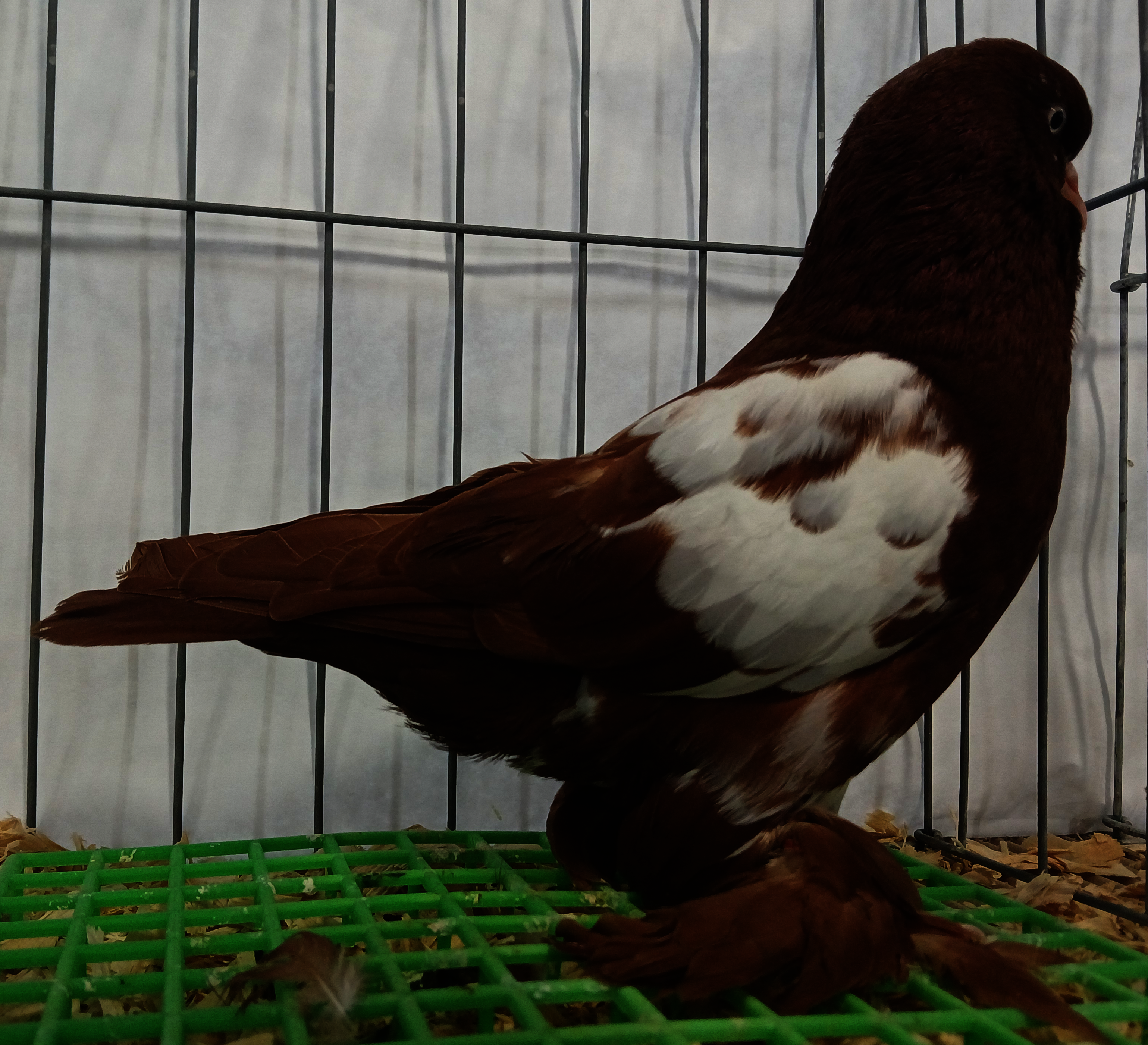

== See also ==
- Pigeon Diet
- Pigeon Housing
- List of pigeon breeds
