= English Short-faced Tumbler =

Breed of pigeon

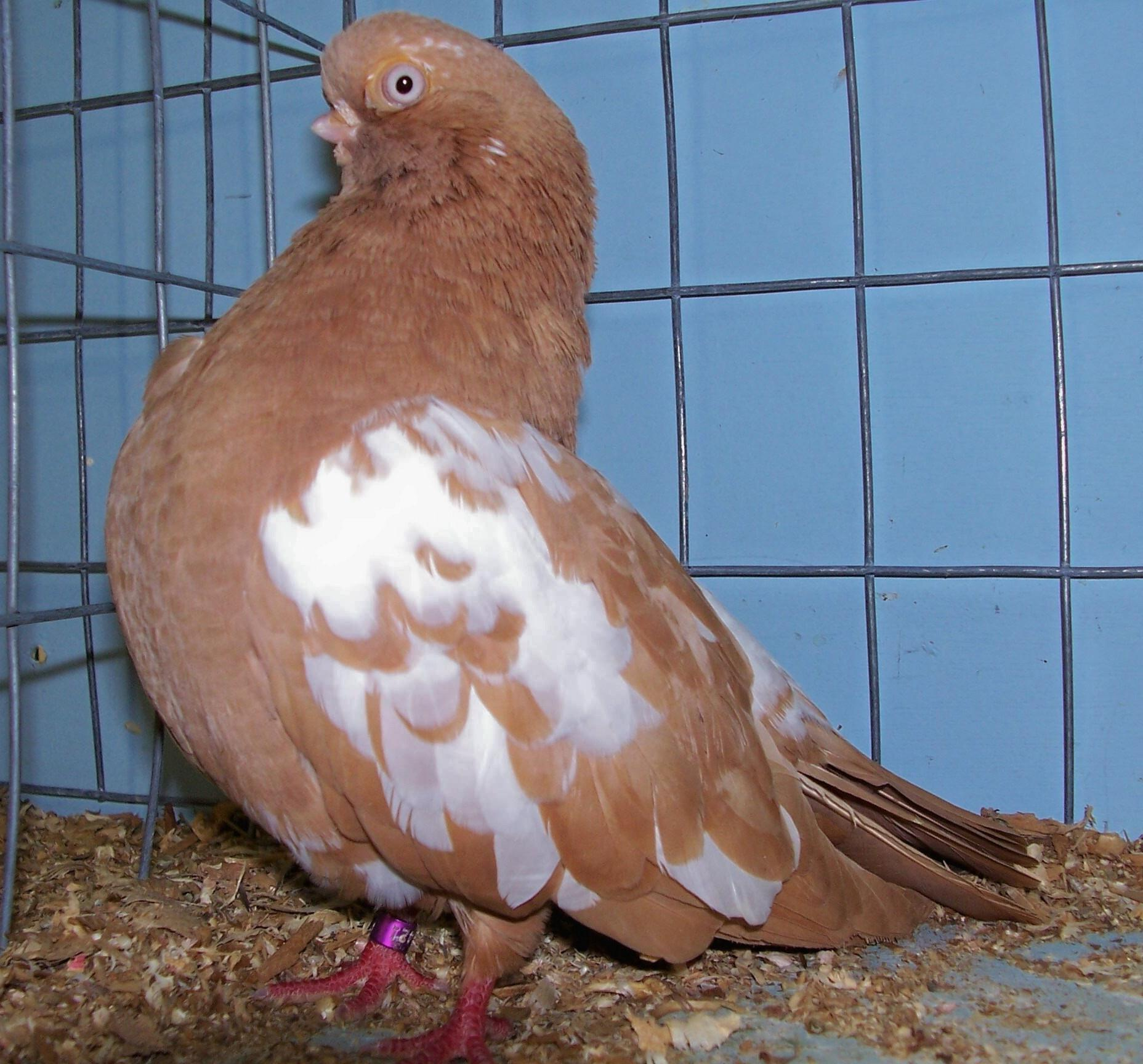
- English Short-faced Tumbler
- Conservation status: Common
- Other names: English Short-face Tumbler
- Country of origin: England

Classification
- US Breed Group: Tumblers, rollers and high flyers
- EE Breed Group: Tumbler and highflyer

Notes
- "Face" in the name of this breed refers to the distance from the centre of the eye to the corner of the mouth. Compare with the English Long-faced Tumbler.

The English Short-faced Tumbler is a breed of fancy pigeon developed over many years of selective breeding. English Short-faced Tumblers along with other varieties of domesticated pigeons are all descendants of the rock dove (Columba livia). The English Short-faced Tumbler is one of the oldest breeds referred to in John Moore's book Columbarium: or, The pigeon-house; being an introduction to a natural history of tame pigeons, giving an account of the several species known in England, with the method of breeding them, their distempers and cures (London: J. Wilford, 1735).

== Gallery ==
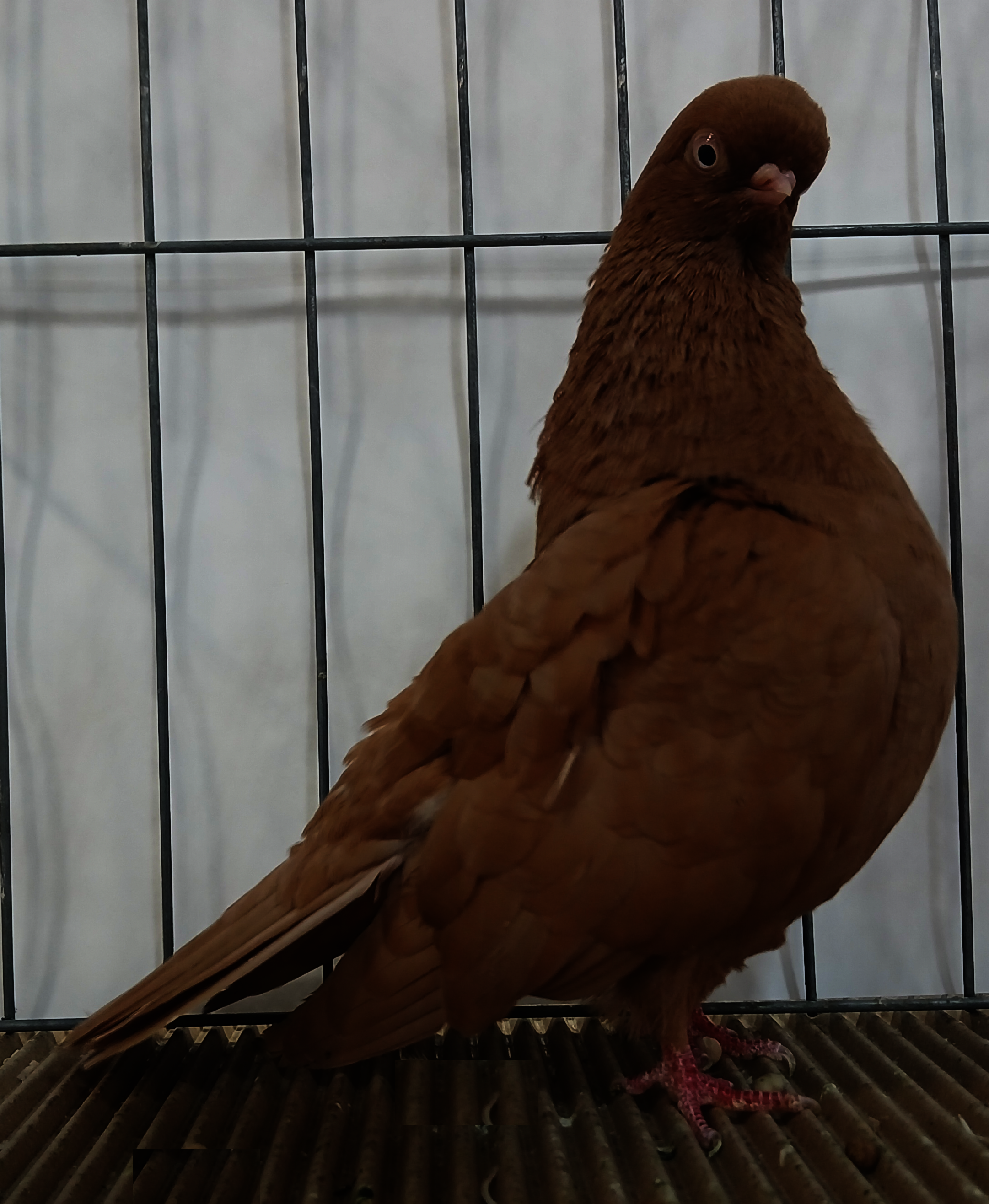
Yellow

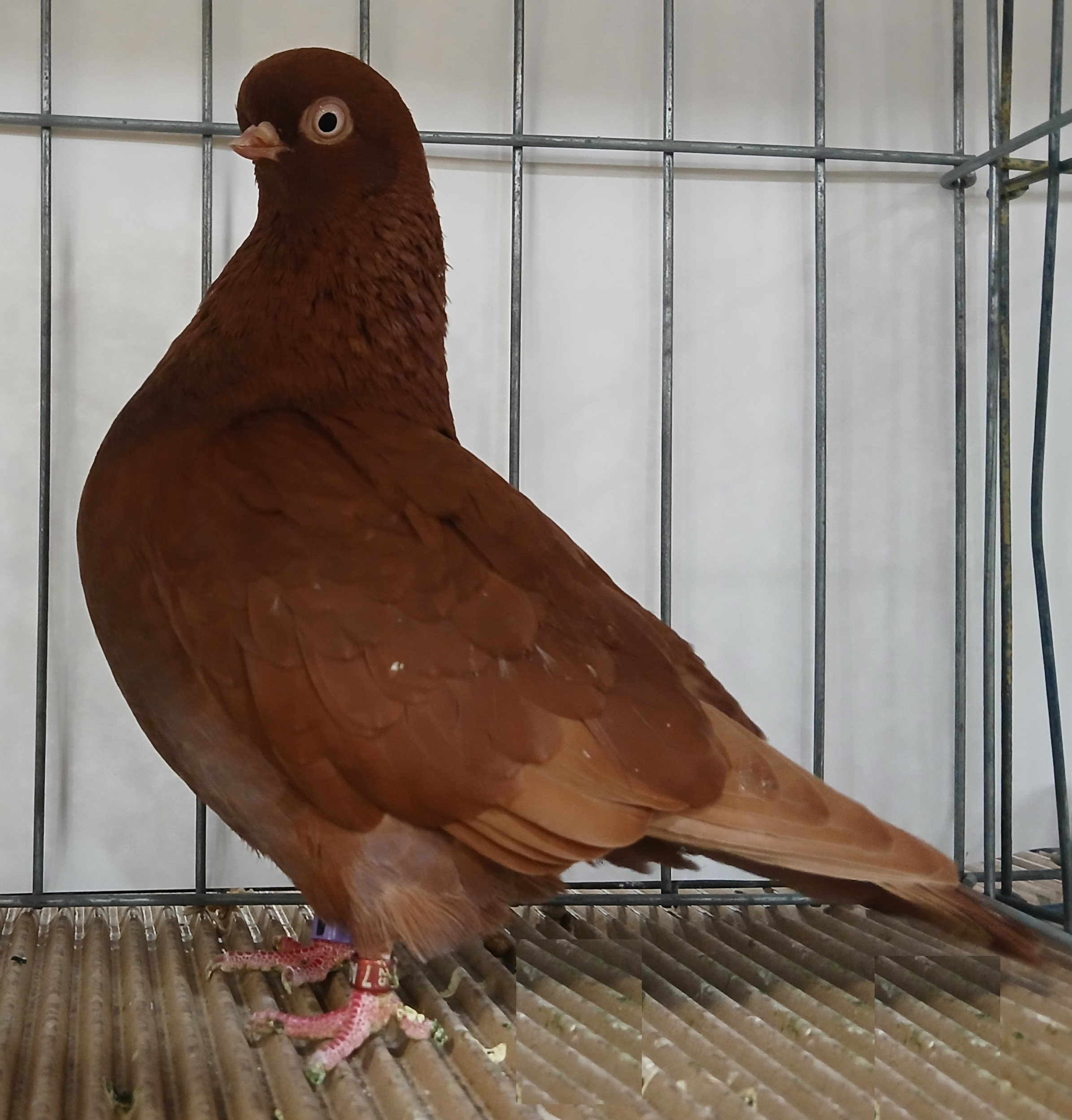
Red

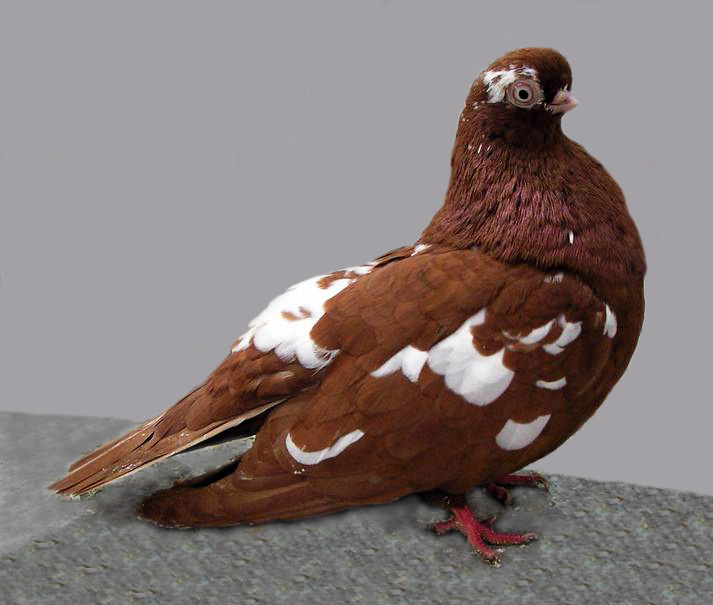
Mottled red

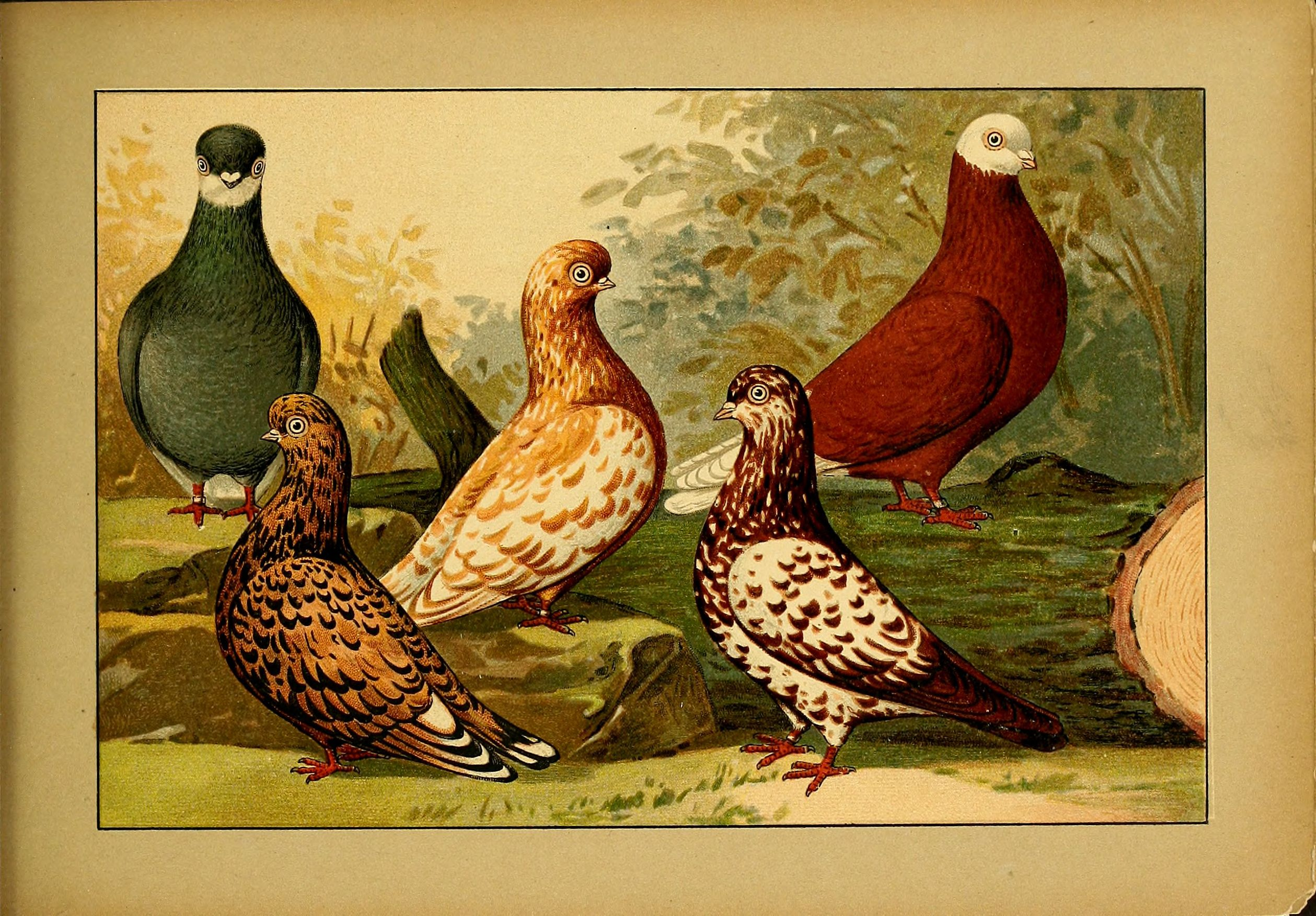
Schachtzabel 1906 Tafel 98

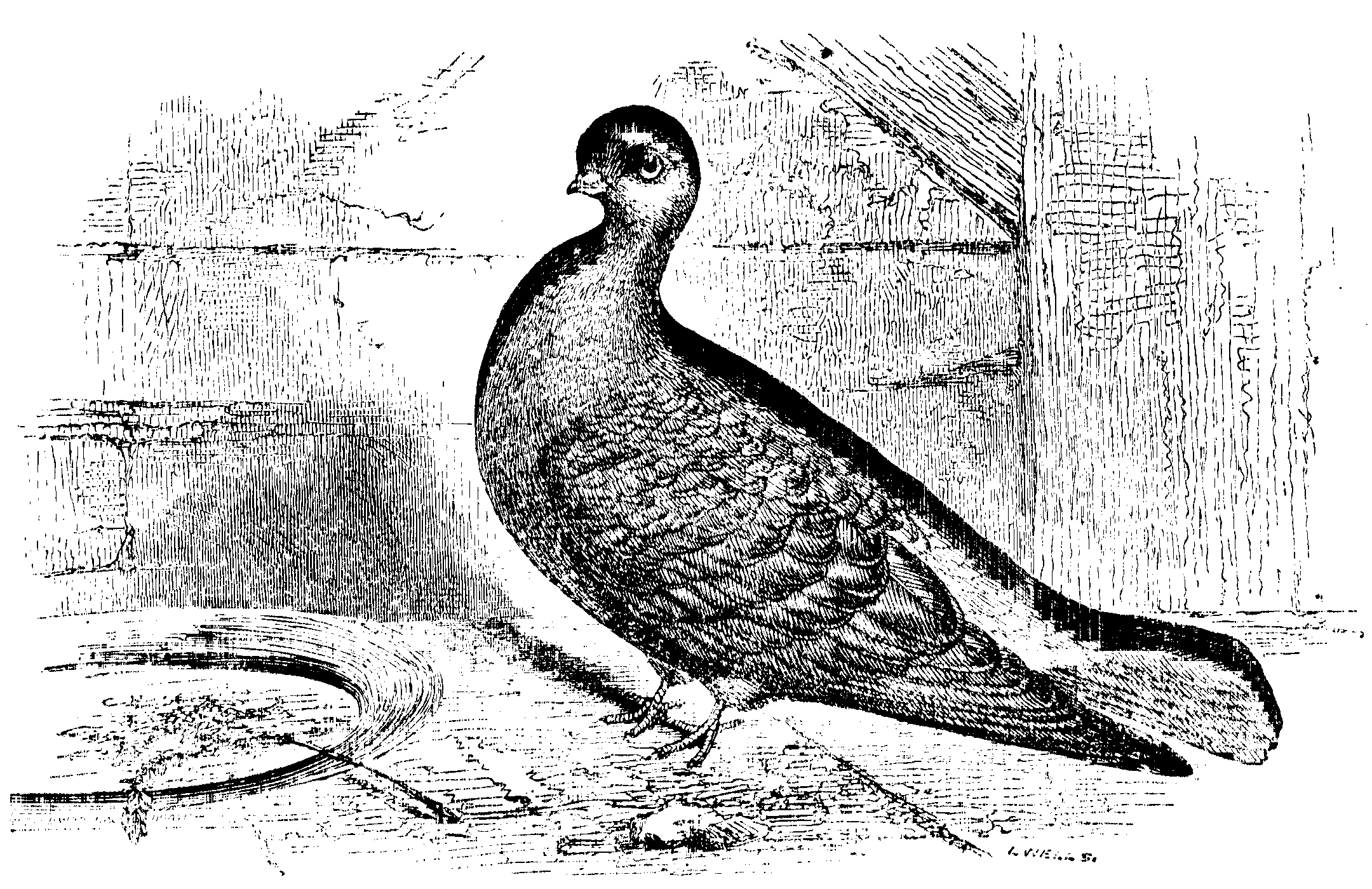
Darwin

== See also ==
- Pigeon Diet
- Pigeon Housing
- List of pigeon breeds
