= Vienna long-faced tumbler =

Breed of pigeon

The Vienna Long-faced Tumbler is one of numerous breeds of tumbler pigeons, reared and exhibited for their ability to spin and tumble down suddenly whilst in flight. Originating in Austria, in and around Vienna, it is an old breed that was known there in the 17th century. It was introduced by the Turks and was crossed with the Barb. It was exhibited in Hamburg in 1867. Dürien (1886) described nine color varieties. In Germany this breed is considered a "medium-faced" one, but in the United States it is considered "long-faced." It mostly occurs in large cities within the United States, since it is usually brought to this country by immigrants.

== Description ==
The Vienna Long-faced Tumbler is a flying breed which is now being exhibited. Its head is long, with low frontal and rather flat top-skull. Its beak is long, thin and straight. Its neck is long and thin; its breast is small and prominent, and its legs are also long and thin. It is small in size, and of average weight (9.5 to 10.5 ounces). It is one of the smallest breeds of pigeons.

Ornaments: It is plain-headed and clean-legged.
