= Armenian Tumbler =

Breed of pigeon

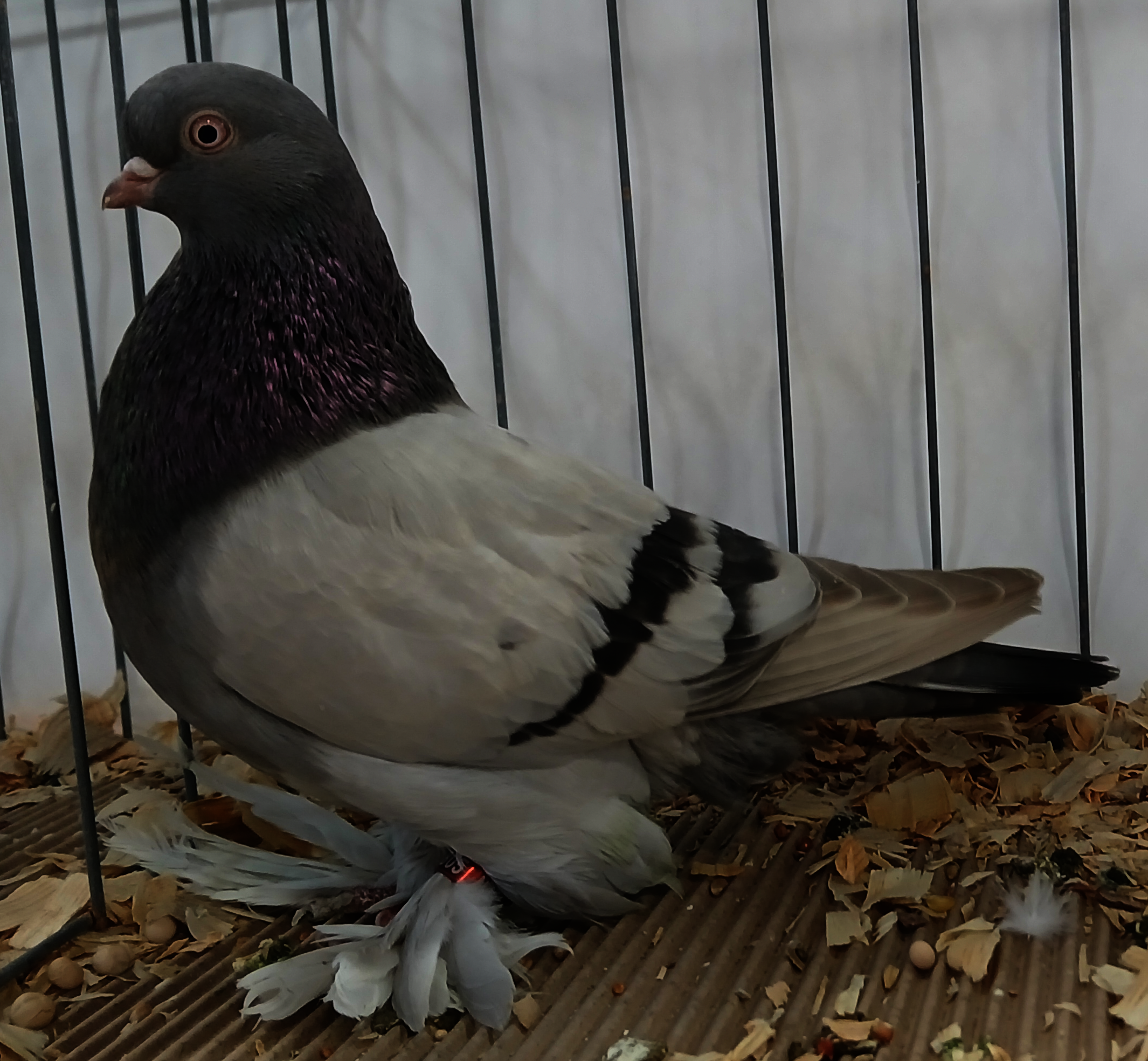
- Blue bar
- Conservation status: Rare
- Country of origin: Armenia

Classification
- Australian Breed Group: Not listed
- US Breed Group: Not listed
- EE Breed Group: Not listed

Notes
- They are not listed in Standards groups

The Armenian Tumbler is a breed of tumblers that originated in Armenia, where they are bred for their color and flight. As the name suggests the Armenian Tumbler is a part of the Tumbler family. The species, like most pigeon species, has the ability to fly.

== Appearance ==
The Armenian Tumbler usually has distinct markings, many having black necks with black tails; others with yellow tails and yellow necks, also known as a bellneck. Their feathers are clear and smooth as well as being strong, they also can have feathers on their feet. The Armenian Tumbler has a round head, which can be fully crested or non-crested. They usually have a medium-sized light pink beak although sometimes have black beaks. Their eye color can be pearl, orange, and yellow and they can also have two eye colors, one for each eye.

== Flight ==
The Armenian Tumbler can fly for about two to three hours. Typical for the tumbler species, they can spin and roll while in flight.

== Gallery ==
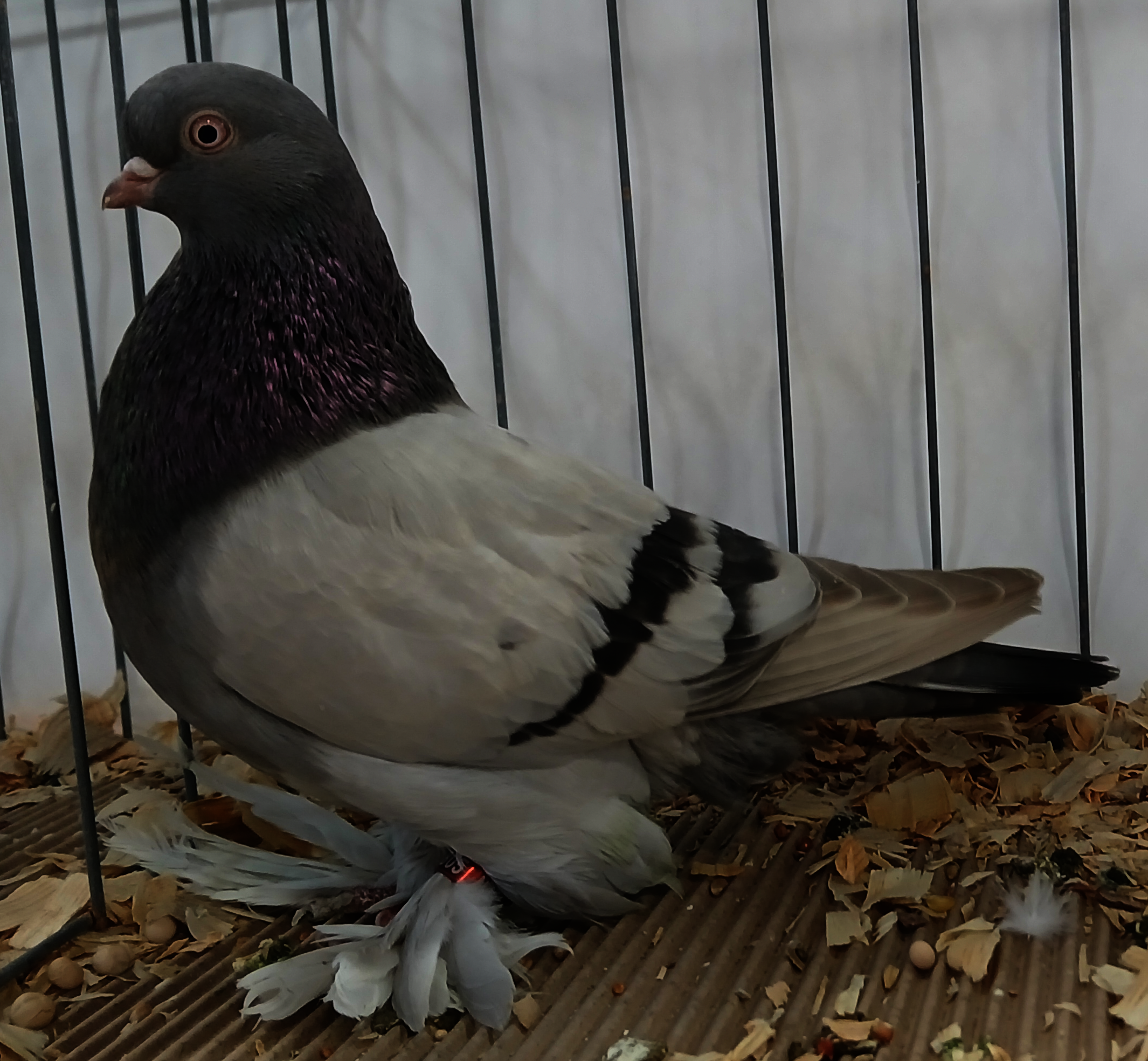
Blue bar

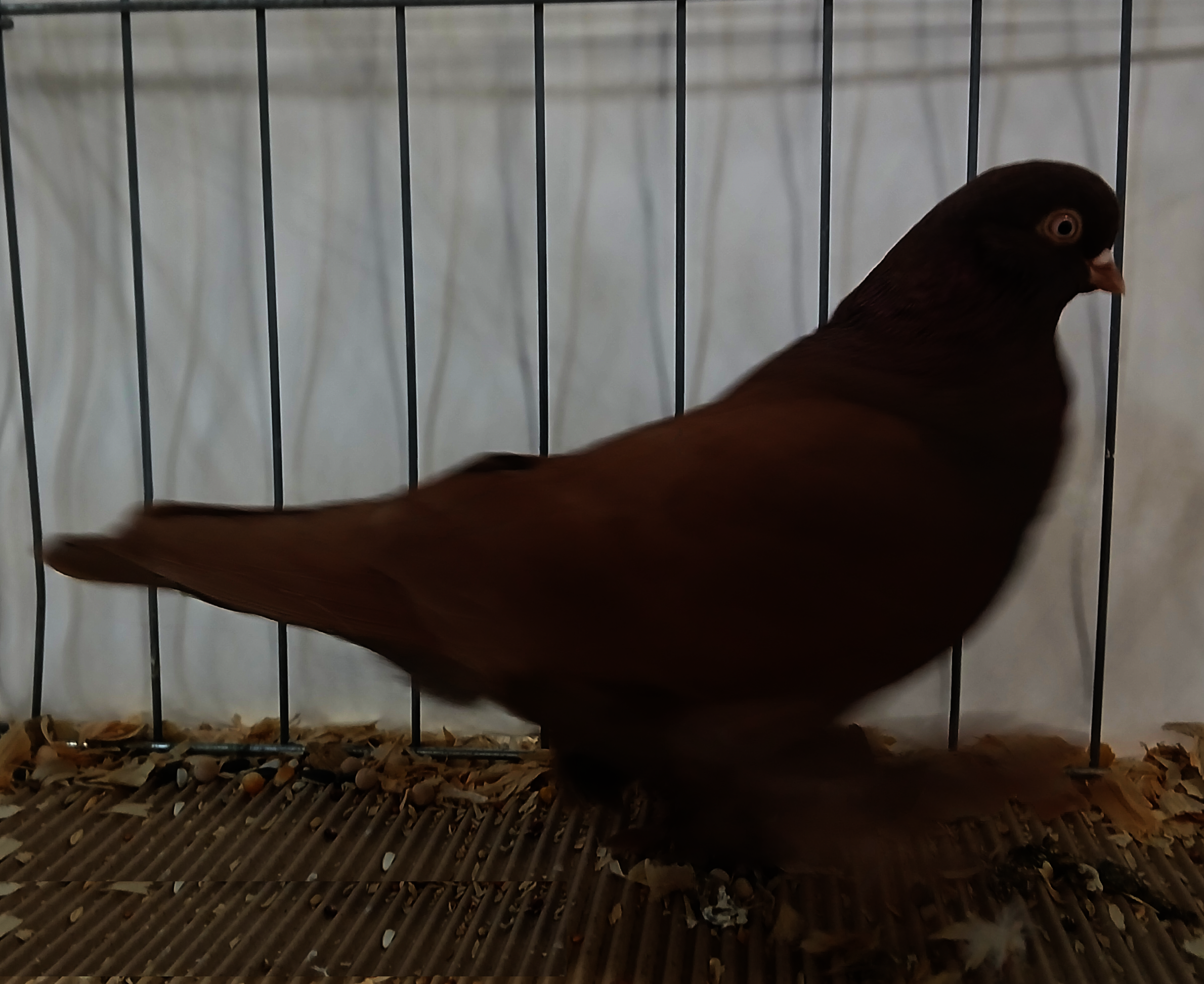
Red

== See also ==
- Pigeon Diet
- Pigeon Housing
- List of pigeon breeds
