= Komorn Tumbler =

Breed of pigeon

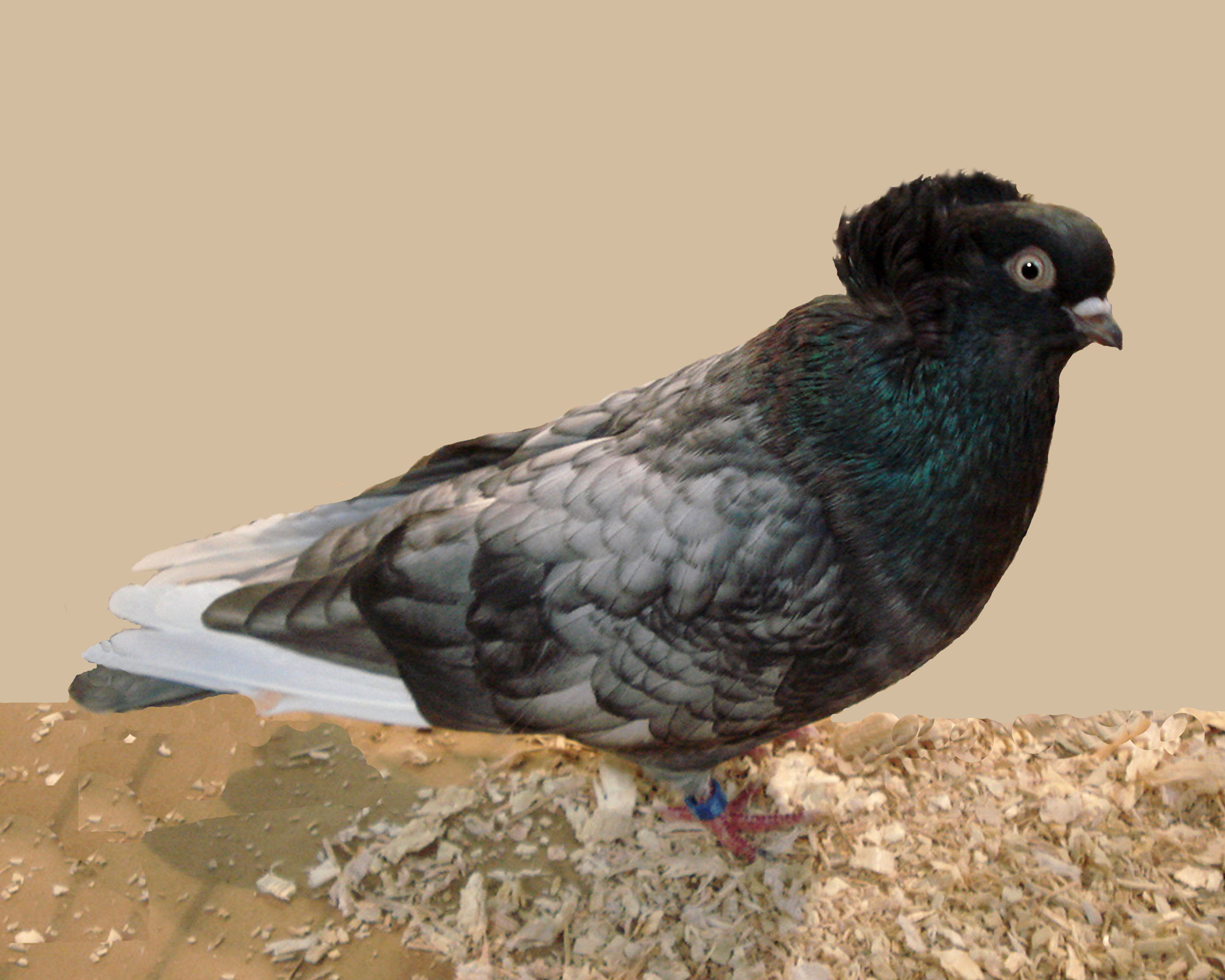
- american Variety Komorner Tumbler
- Conservation status: Common
- Other names: Komárňanský kotrmeliak, Komáromi bukó, Komorner Tümmler
- Country of origin: Slovakia

Classification
- US Breed Group: Fancy
- EE Breed Group: Tumbler Pigeons

Notes
- Very often seen with magpie markings

The Komorn Tumbler (commonly called a Komorner, in Slovak Komárňanský kotrmeliak, in Hungarian Komáromi bukó) is a breed of fancy pigeon developed over many years of selective breeding. The breed has American and European varieties that are recognized as separate breeds at shows with classes catering for American Komorner Tumblers and European Komorner Tumblers. Originally bred for acrobatic flying as a tumbler pigeon, Komorners are seldom free-flown today, and exist only for exhibition in pigeon shows.

== Origin ==
The breed originated in the 18-19th century in the city Komárno in Austrian Empire (on the current Slovak-Hungarian border). Its ancestors were imported by Ottoman Turks from eastern parts of the Ottoman Empire. The breed was imported into the United States by John Astalos and Peter Modola, both of Illinois, in the late 1920s, and has grown in popularity since. The American Komorner Club was organized in 1946.

== Appearance ==
Komorners are small, slim pigeons—much more compact and delicate than the popular Racing Homer. The bird typically sports a magpied pattern with colors in black, blue, red, silver, yellow, and dun. They are also bred in solid colors. The head is adorned with a crest extending from ear to ear, and terminating in rosettes.

== Gallery ==
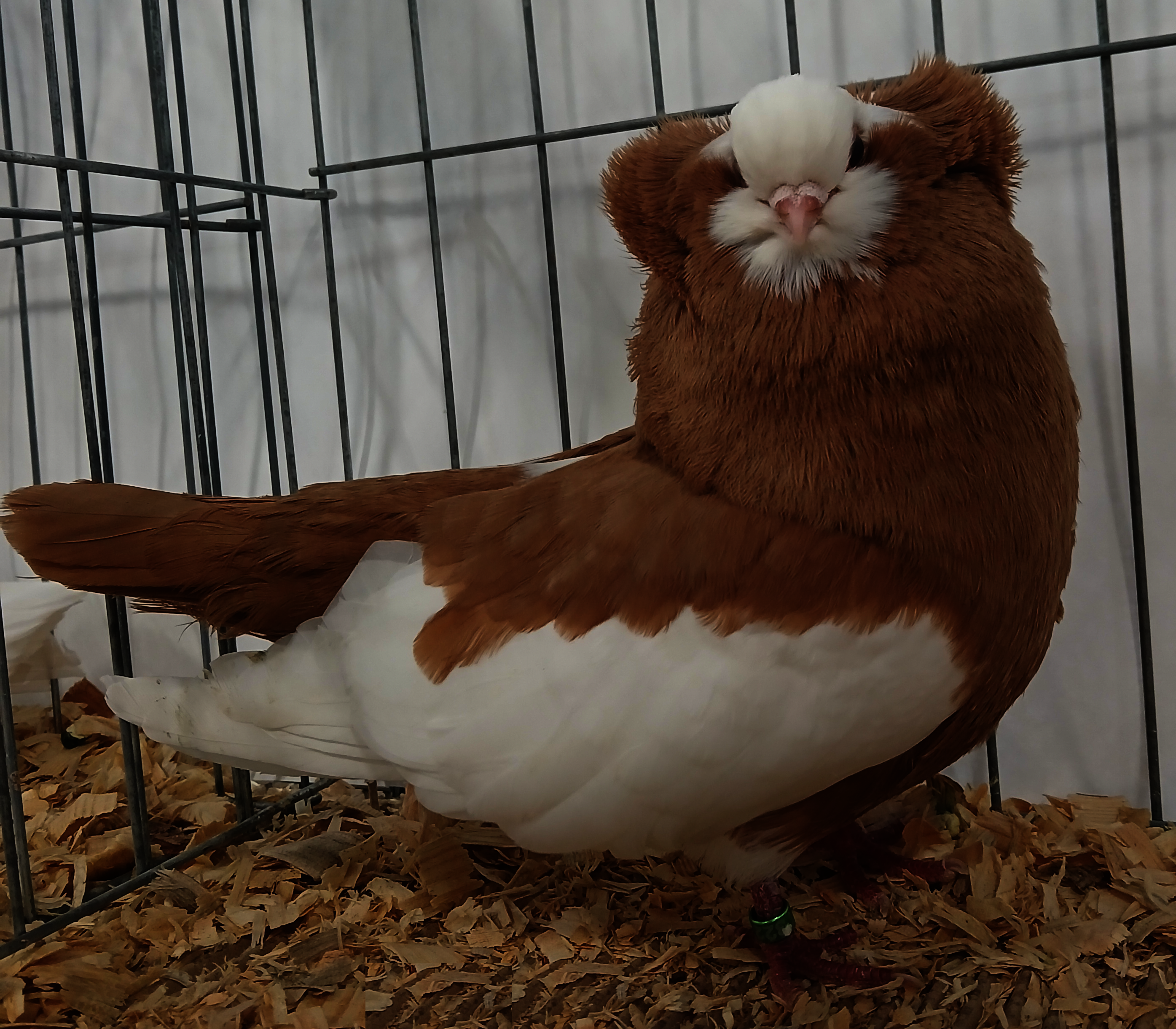
Yellow

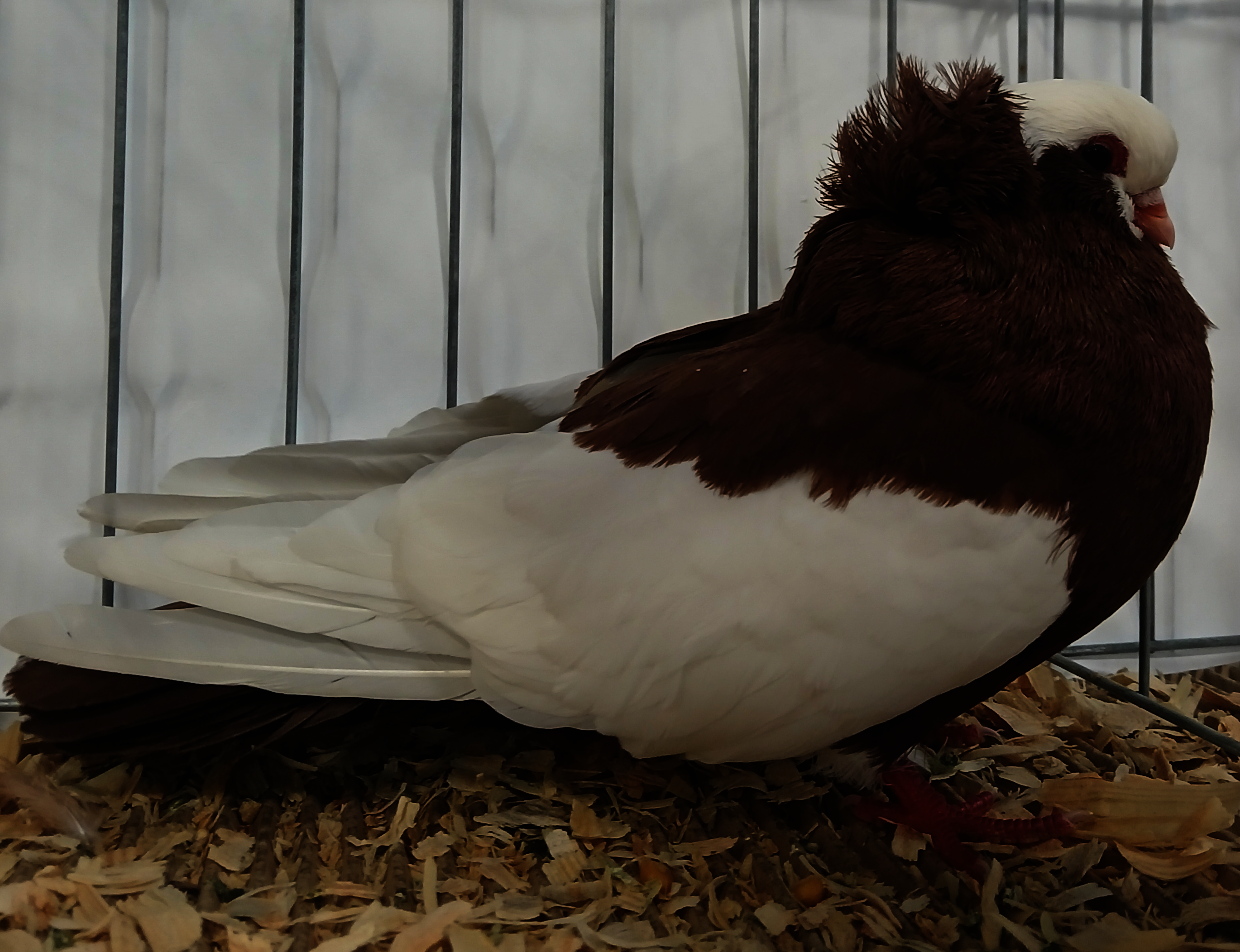
Red

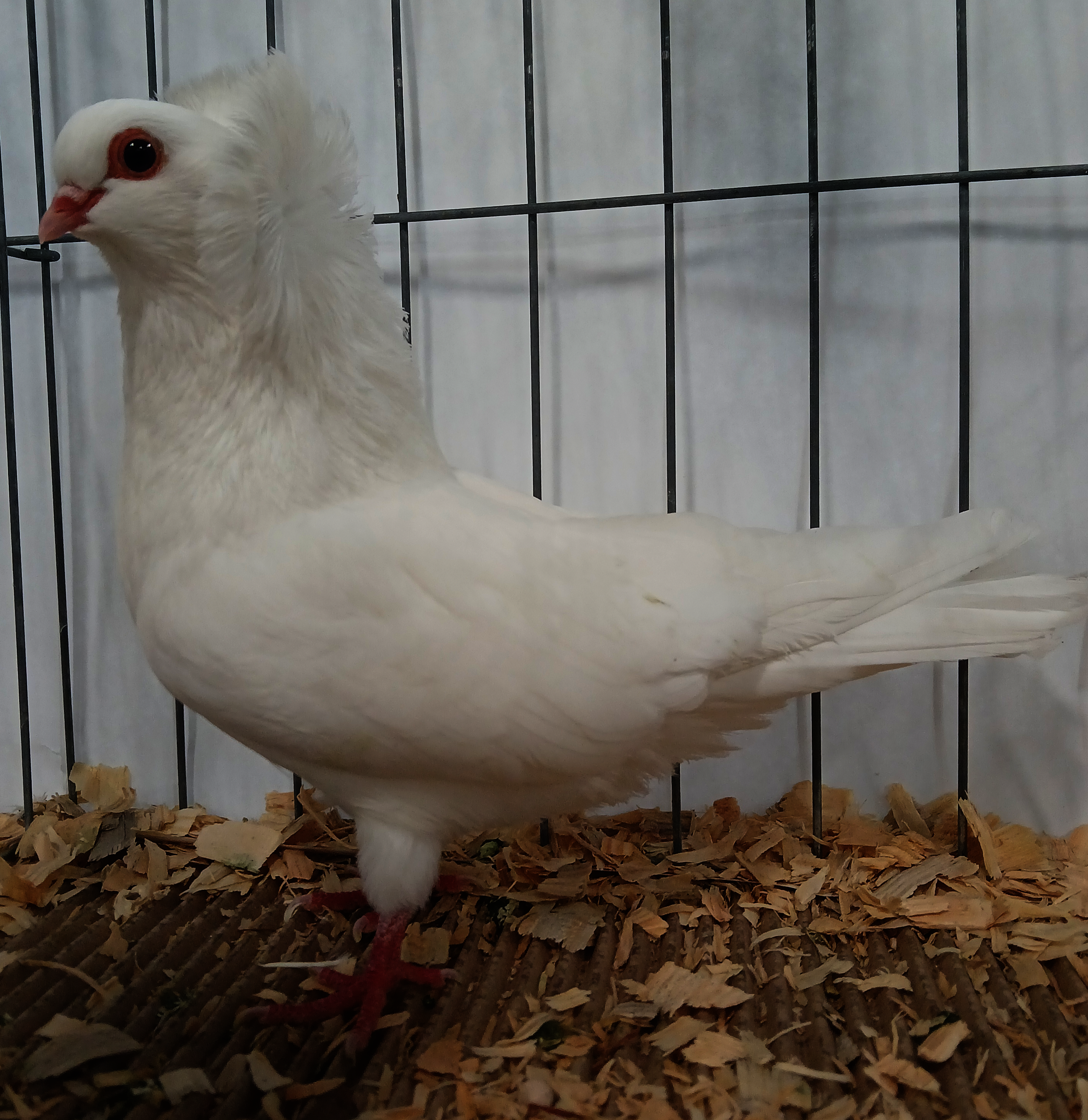
White

== See also ==
- Pigeon Diet
- Pigeon Housing
- Birmingham Roller
- List of pigeon breeds
