= Berlin Short-faced Tumbler =

Breed of pigeon

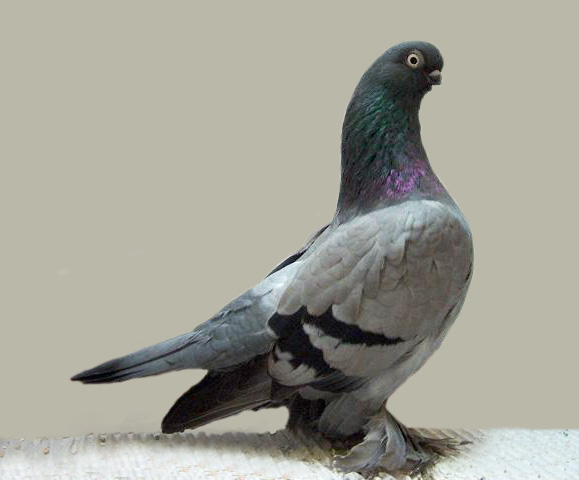
- Conservation status: Common

Traits
- Feather ornamentation: foot feathering

Classification
- Australian Breed Group: Tumblers Group 6
- US Breed Group: Tumbler, roller, flyer
- EE Breed Group: Rare Breeds

Notes
- The "face" in this breed refers to the distance between the center of the eye and the corner of the mouth.

The Berlin Short-faced Tumbler is a breed of fancy pigeon developed over many years of selective breeding. Berlin Short-faced Tumblers, along with other varieties of domesticated pigeons, are all descendants of the rock dove (Columba livia).

== Origin ==
This breed was developed by crossing the Ancient Tumbler, Kazaner Tumbler and other breeds in Berlin and surrounds in the mid 19th Century.

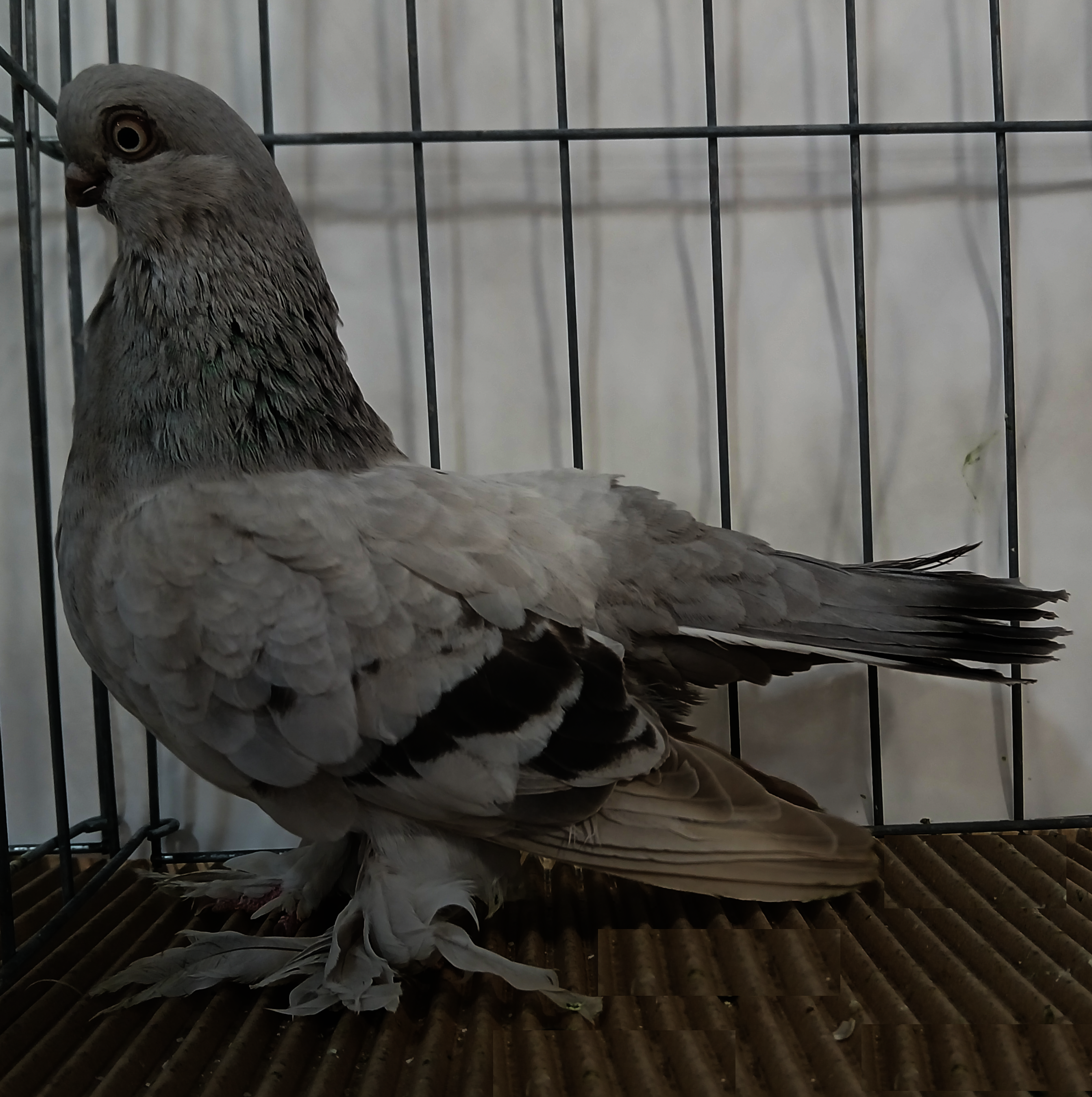
Berlin Short-face Tumbler Blue bar

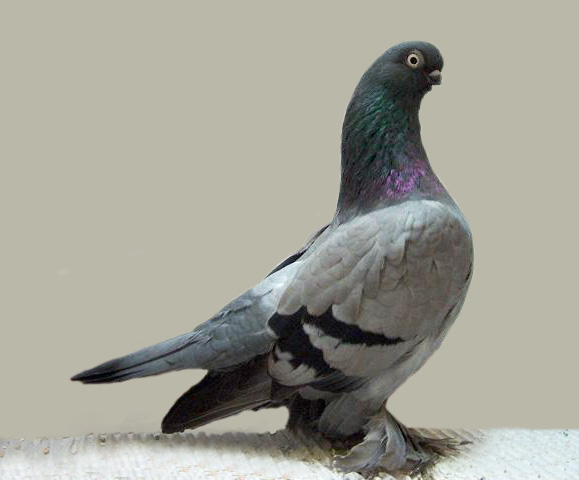
Blue bar

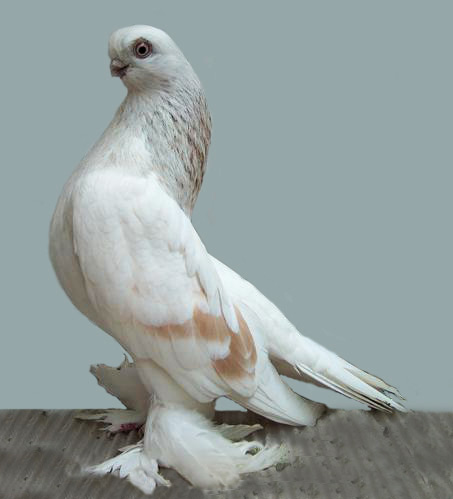
Cream bar

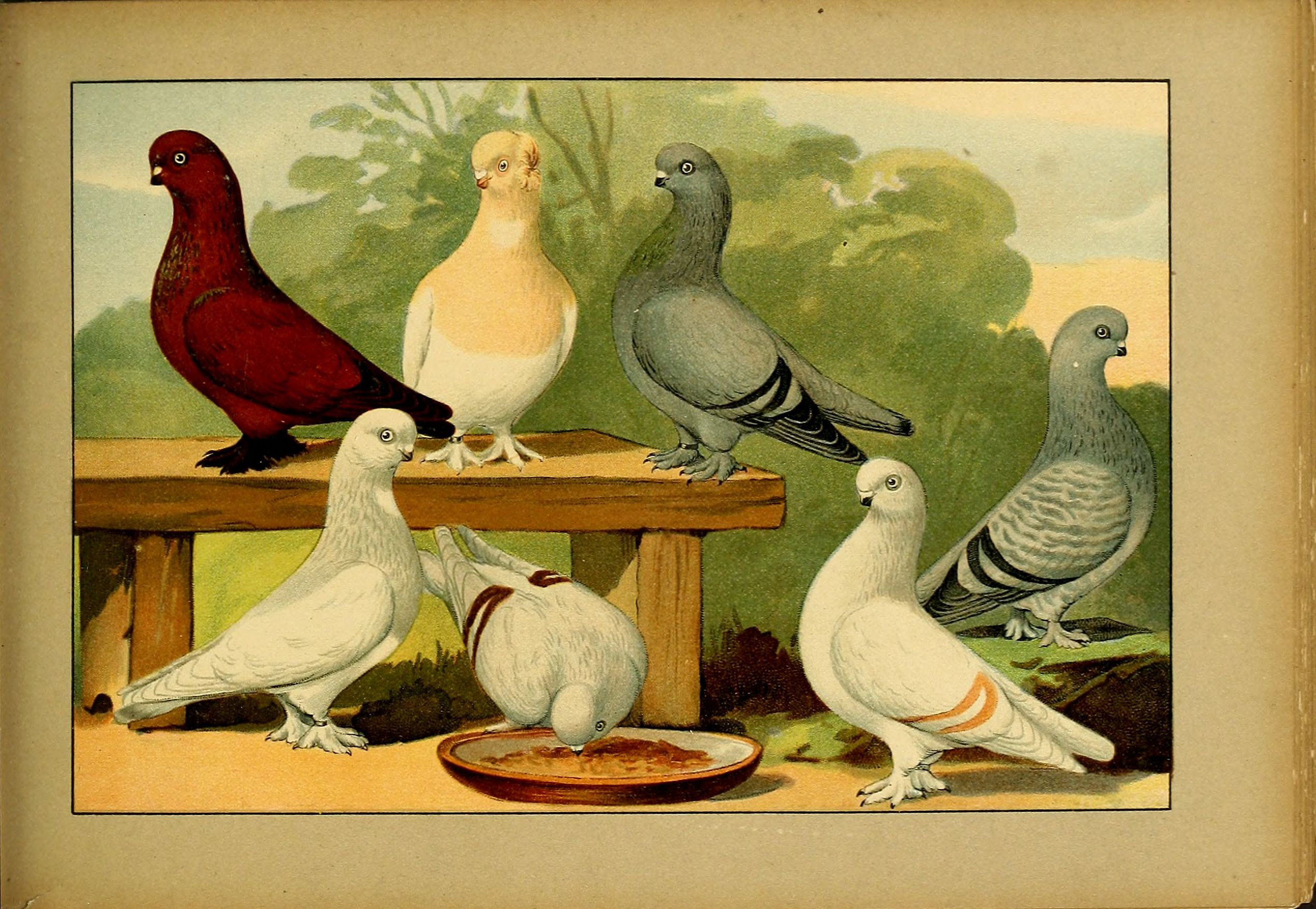
Schachtzabel 1906 Tafel 88

== See also ==
- List of pigeon breeds
- Pigeon keeping
