= Iranian Highflying Tumbler =

Breed of pigeon

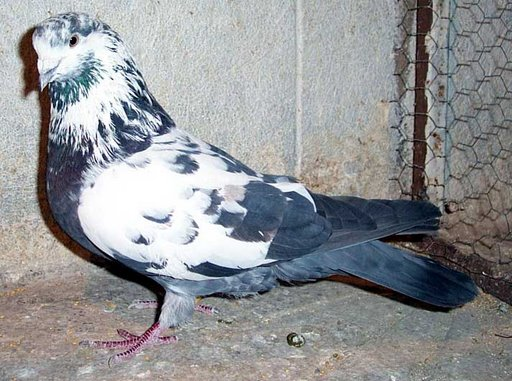
- Iranian Highflyer Cock (Sooski)
- Conservation status: Common
- Country of origin: Iran

Classification
- US Breed Group: Flying

The Iranian Highflying Tumbler pigeon also known as "Persian Highflying Tumbler" in Europe and "Tehrani" in Iran is a breed of domestic pigeon bred in Iran for performance and endurance flying competitions. They fly at a very high altitude and at times out of sight. The tumbling is nothing like a Birmingham Roller, individual flips, occasionally hovering before it does the flip.

The best birds tend to rise above the rest of the kit to show off their talents. The flying characteristic of the Iranian Highflyer is that of a soaring/hovering bird (as opposed to the raking flying style of for instance the Tippler), with a slower wing beat than most flying breeds of pigeons. They are endurance flyers gaining altitude quickly, and have been reported to fly as long as 8 to 12 hours.

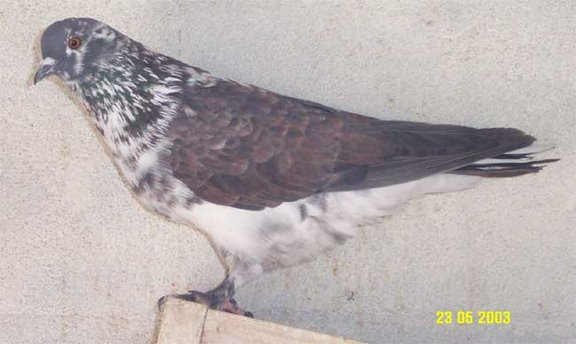
An Iranian Highflyer hen (ghareh)

The Persian Highflying Tumbler comes in various patterns and colors both in plain headed or crested.

They come from three major cities: Tehran, Kashan and Qom. The highflyer type can be found in other parts of Iran.

== See also ==
- Tippler
- Birmingham Roller
- List of pigeon breeds
