= Budapest Short-faced Tumbler =

Breed of pigeon

Budapest Short Face Tumbler
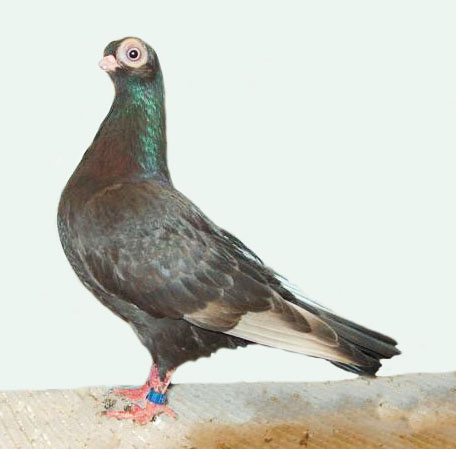
- Budapest Short Face Tumbler
- Conservation status: Common
- Other names: Budapest Shortbeak (EE)
- Country of origin: Hungary

Classification
- US Breed Group: Fancy
- EE Breed Group: Tumbler and Highflyer

Budapest Short-faced Tumblers are a breed of fancy pigeon developed over many years of selective breeding. The breed was created in Budapest, Hungary. The date of origin is uncertain, but mentioned by Prutz in 1884. Budapest Short-faced Tumblers, along with other varieties of domesticated pigeons, are all descendants of the rock dove (Columba livia).

== Description ==
While originally a flying tumbler breed it is now bred for exhibition. It is rather small and slender weighing just 10 ounces. It has a short stout beak and a rather cube shaped head with a depression on top making the eyes bulge out a bit like a frog. The base color is white with the wing tips and tail showing blue/black coloration.

== Gallery ==
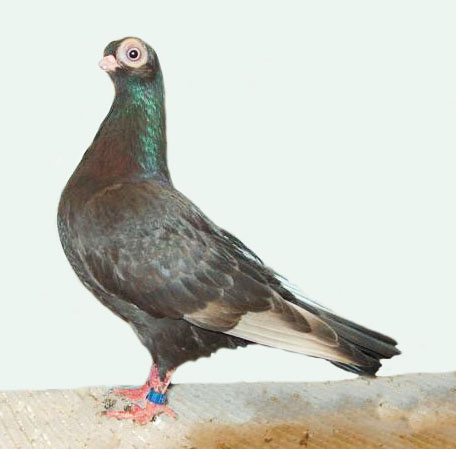
Budapest Short Faced Tumbler

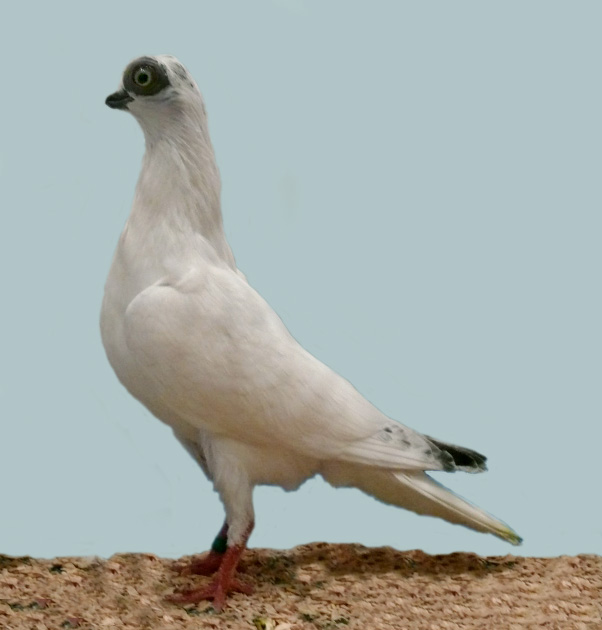
Budapest Short Faced Tumbler

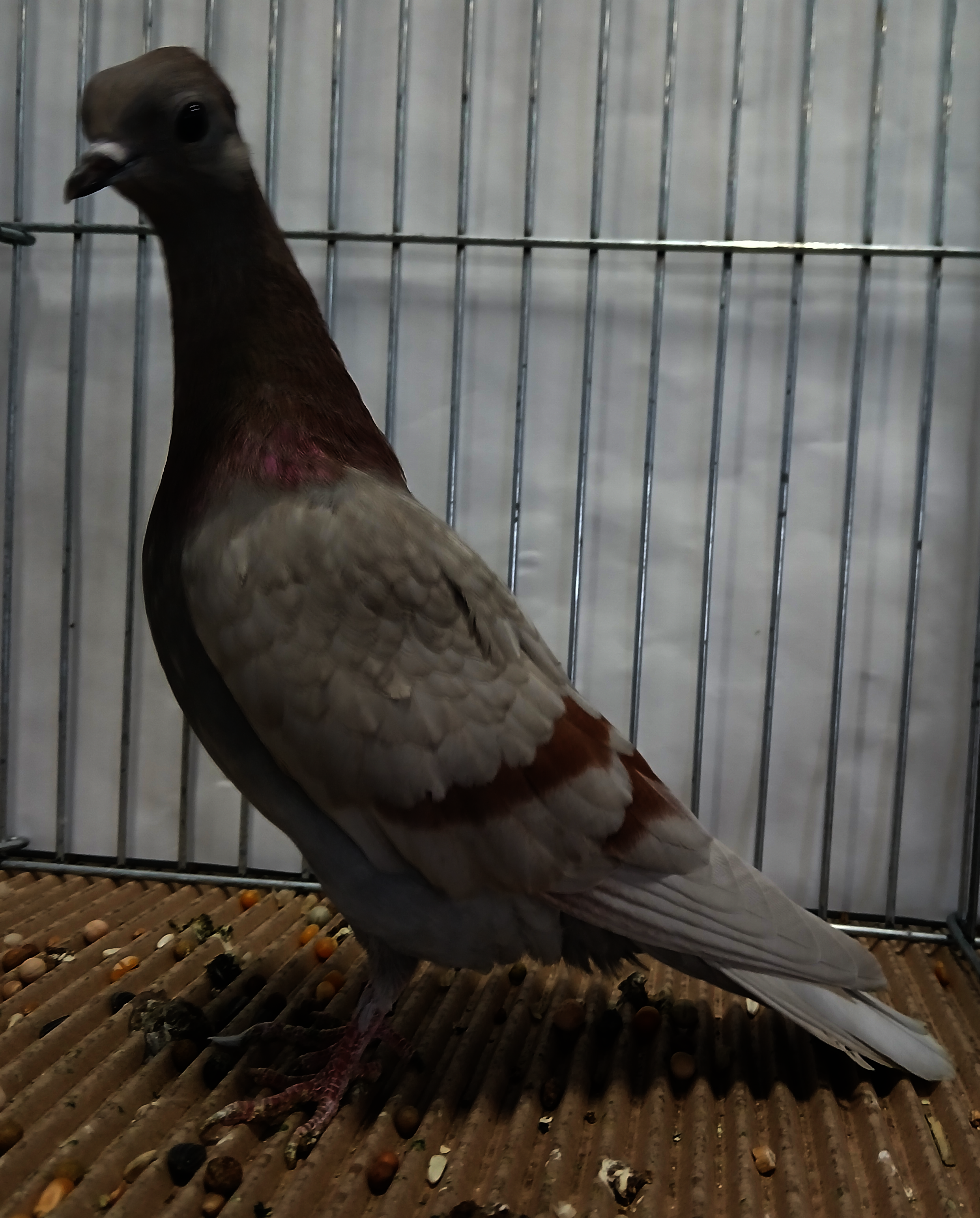
Red bar

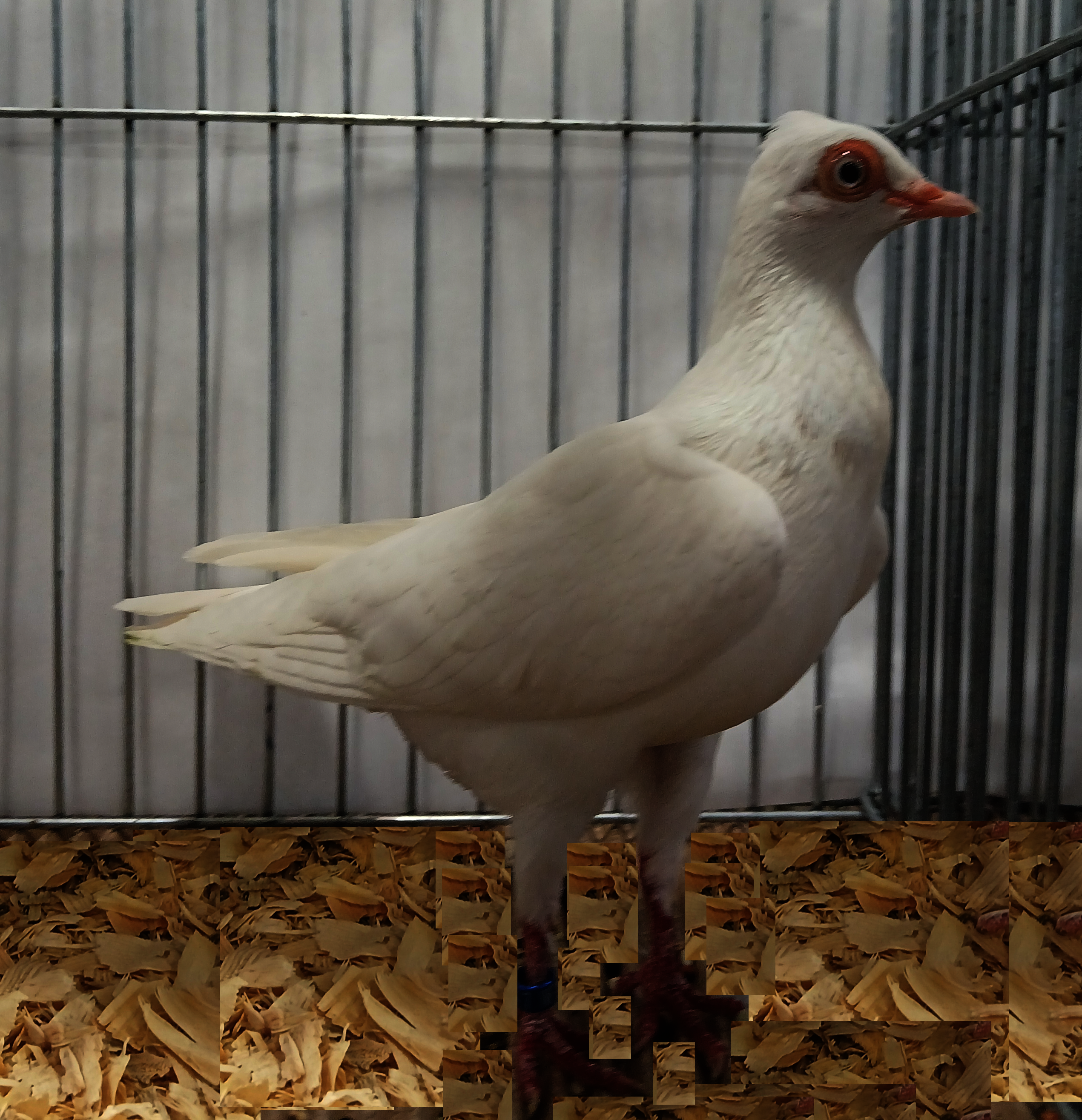
White

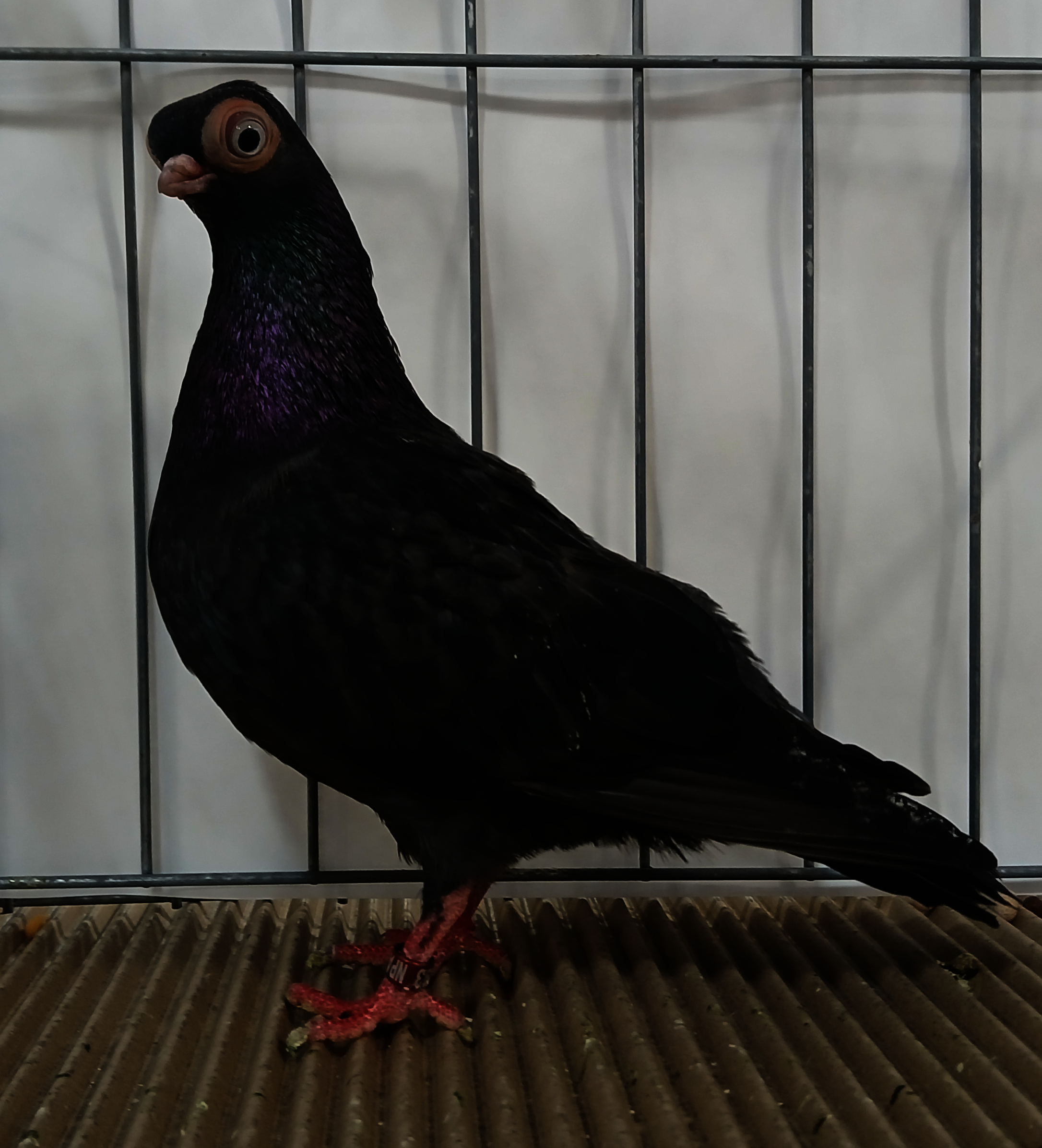
Black

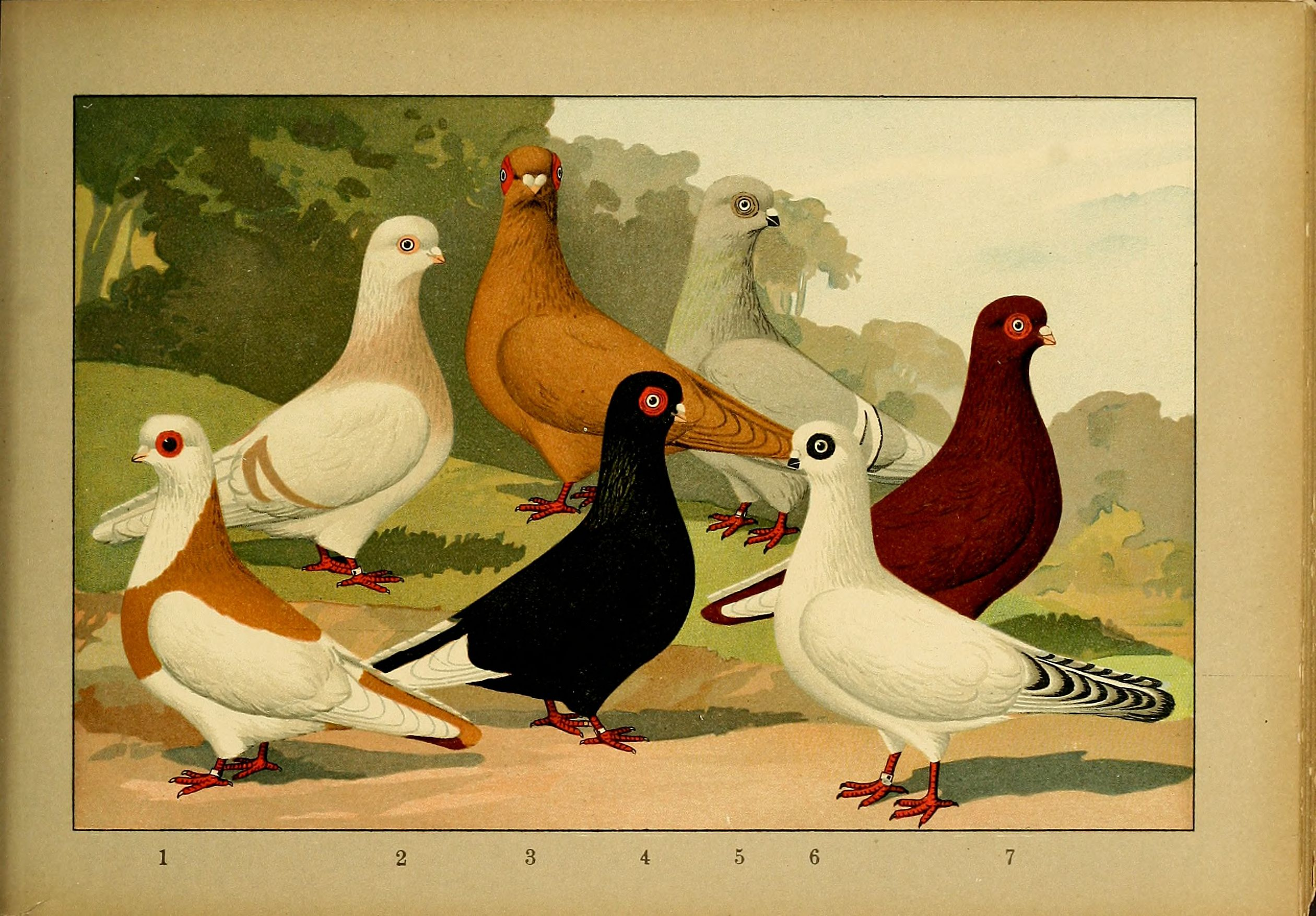
Schachtzabel 1906 Tafel 93

== See also ==
- Pigeon Diet
- Pigeon Housing
- List of pigeon breeds
