= Berlin Long-faced Tumbler =

Breed of pigeon

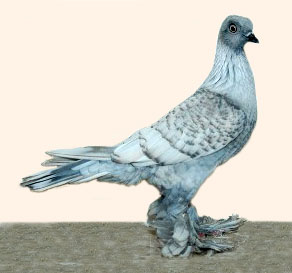
- Reduced Berlin Long-faced Tumbler
- Conservation status: Common

Classification
- US Breed Group: Tumbler, roller, flyer
- EE Breed Group: Tumbler and highflyer

Notes
- The "face" in this breed refers to the distance from the center of the eye to the corner of the mouth.

The Berlin Long-faced Tumbler is a breed of fancy pigeon. Berlin Long-faced Tumblers, along with other varieties of domesticated pigeons, are all descendants of the rock dove (Columba livia).

== See also ==
- List of pigeon breeds
