= Felégyhaza Tumbler =

Breed of pigeon

Félegyháza Tumbler
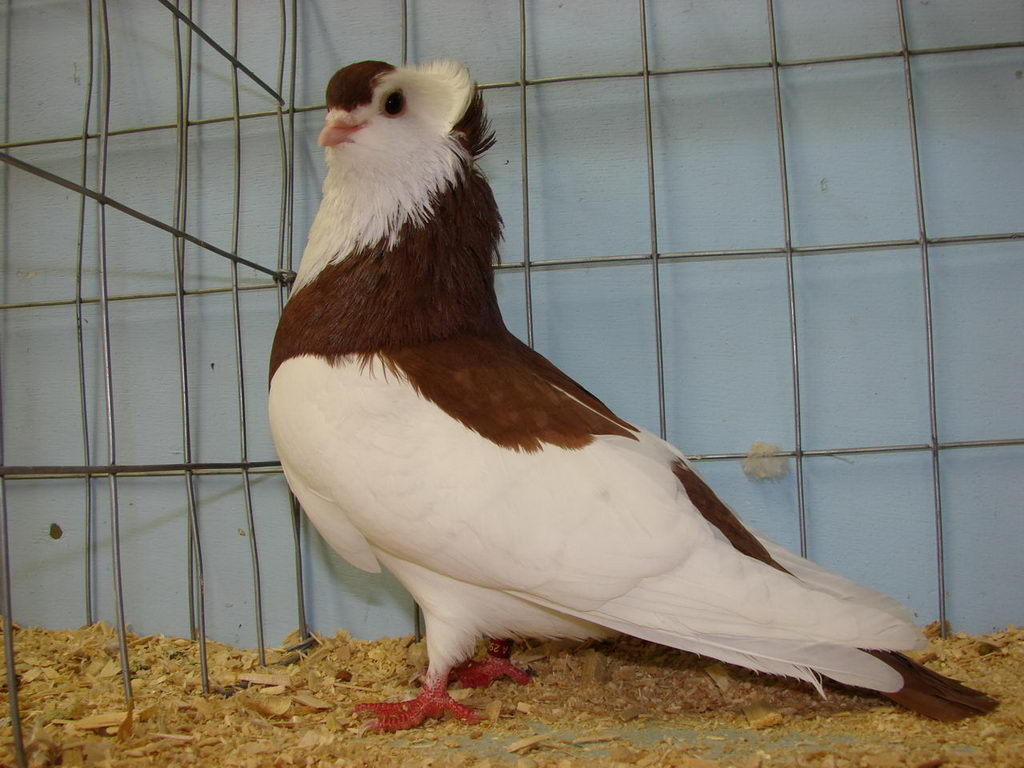
- Félegyháza Tumbler
- Conservation status: Common
- Other names: Kiskunfélegyházi keringő
- Country of origin: Hungary

Classification
- US Breed Group: Fancy
- EE Breed Group: Tumbler and Highflyer

Notes
- A very distinctively marked breed.

The Félegyhaza Tumbler is a breed of fancy pigeon developed over many years of selective breeding. Felegyhazer Tumblers, along with other varieties of domesticated pigeons, are all descendants of the rock dove (Columba livia). The name is short for Kiskunfélegyháza, a town in the Hungarian lowlands.

== See also ==
- List of pigeon breeds
