= English Long-faced Tumbler =

Breed of pigeon

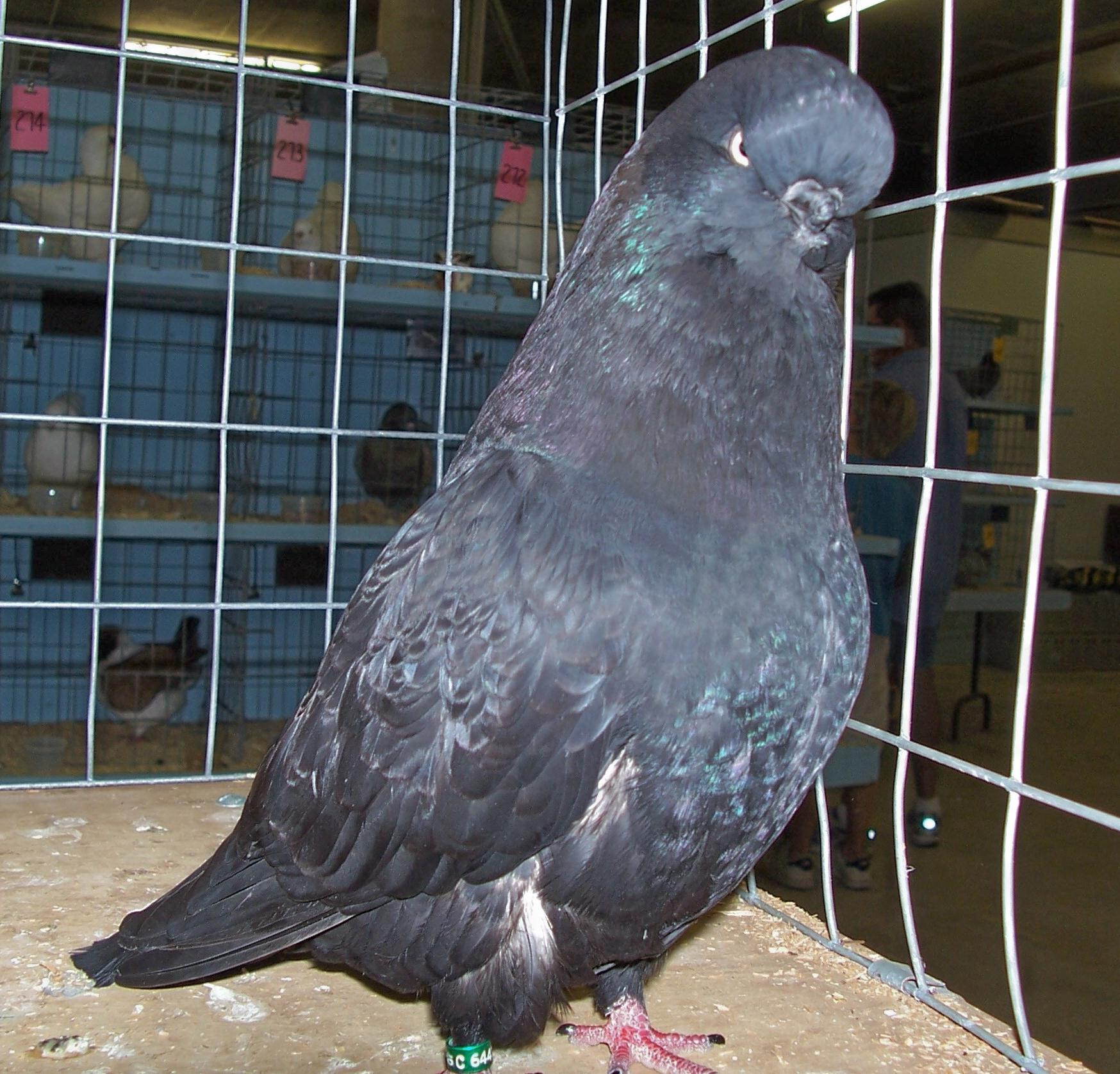
- English Long-faced Tumbler, clean-legged
- Conservation status: Common
- Other names: Variants: English Long-faced Tumbler, clean-legged (or English Long-face Clean-leg Tumbler); English Long-faced Tumbler, muffed (or English Long-face Muff Tumbler)
- Country of origin: England

Classification
- US Breed Group: Tumblers, rollers and high flyers
- EE Breed Group: Tumbler and highflyer

Notes
- "Face" refers to the distance between the center of the eye and the corner of the mouth. The face of this bird is long only in comparison with other English show tumblers.

The English Long-faced Tumbler is a breed of fancy pigeon developed over many years of selective breeding. English Long-faced Tumblers, along with other varieties of domesticated pigeons, are all descendants of the rock dove (Columba livia).

This breed is available in both clean legged and muffed (feathered legs) varieties. Due to its short beak it requires foster parents (homing pigeons, etc.) to raise its young. The breed is popular around the world and has continued development particularly in the United States.

== See also ==
- List of pigeon breeds
