= Sivas Kumru Güvercin =

Breed of pigeon

The Sivas Kumru Güvercin or Sivas Dove Pigeon is a rather petite pigeon originated from Turkey. It belongs to the voice pigeons family and is mostly kept in the Sivas region of the country. One of its main characteristics is the unique and distinctive high-pitched sound it makes. It is one of the smallest breeds of pigeons in the world today, with adults weighing less than 250 grams (7 ounces).

There are many other breeds of pigeons with its own unique singing style. To name a few there are the English Trumpeter, the Arabian Trumpeter, Bokhara Trumpeter, Dresden Trumpeter, Altenburger Trumpeter, Franconian Trumpeter and so on. Each of these breeds have its own unique singing style with a common 'trumpeting' ability that varies in pitch degrees. Over the years of perfecting these breeds for Show purpose, color variations and looks, some of these pigeons within the voice pigeon breeds has lost this unique ability.

The quality of their voice or singing style is considered to be the most important features of this breed followed closely by their size. They need to be as small as possible, hence the name kumru (dove). High pitched fine sound are considered more valuable ones.

== See also ==
- List of pigeon breeds
