= Trumpeter (pigeon) =

Breed of pigeon

The Trumpeter breeds of fancy pigeon are so named because of their unique vocalizations which sound vaguely like low laughter. Wendell Levi describes this trumpeting vocalization in his book The Pigeon. There are several domesticated varieties that possess this "trumpeting" ability to various degrees. Some of the more popular are:

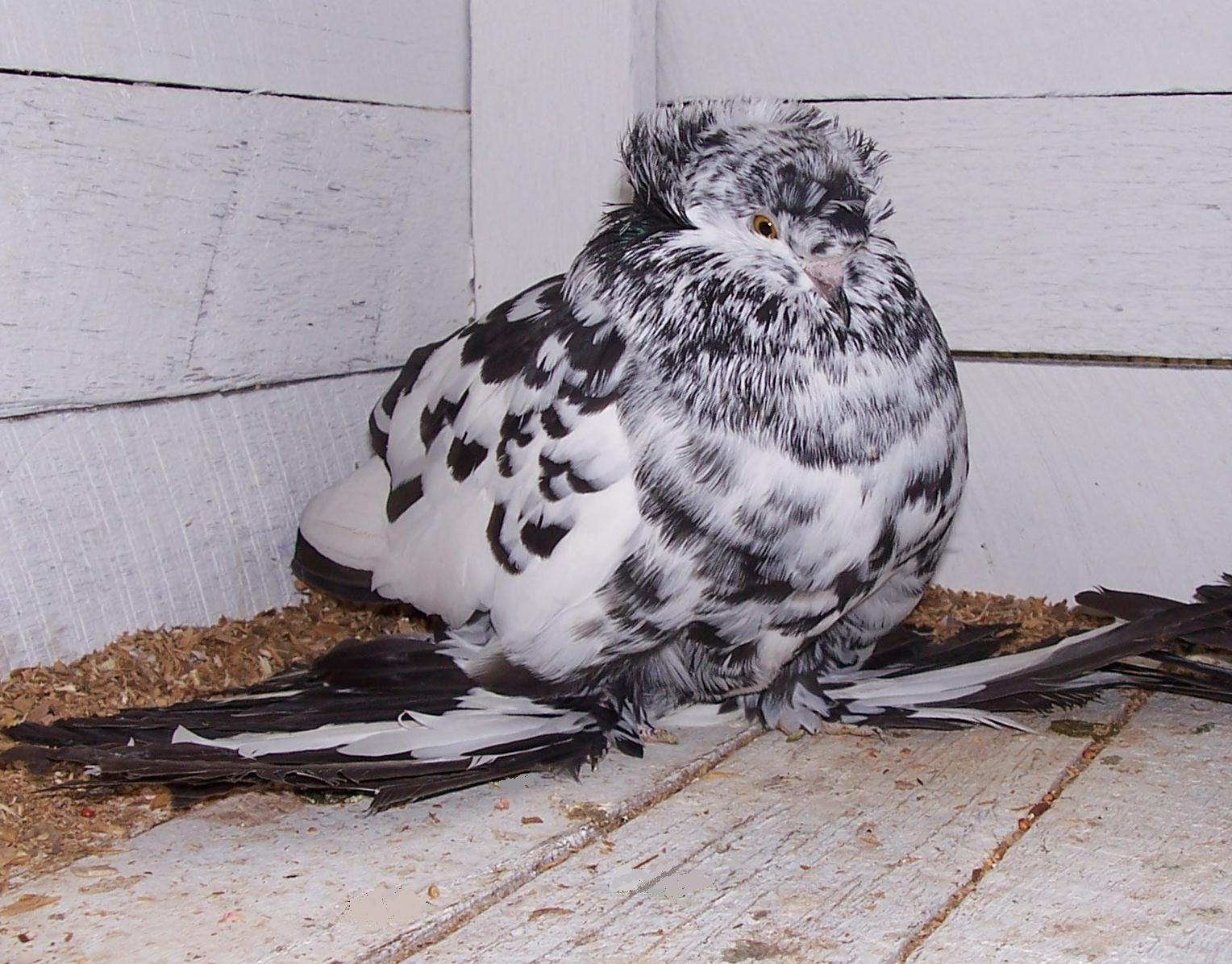
English Trumpeter

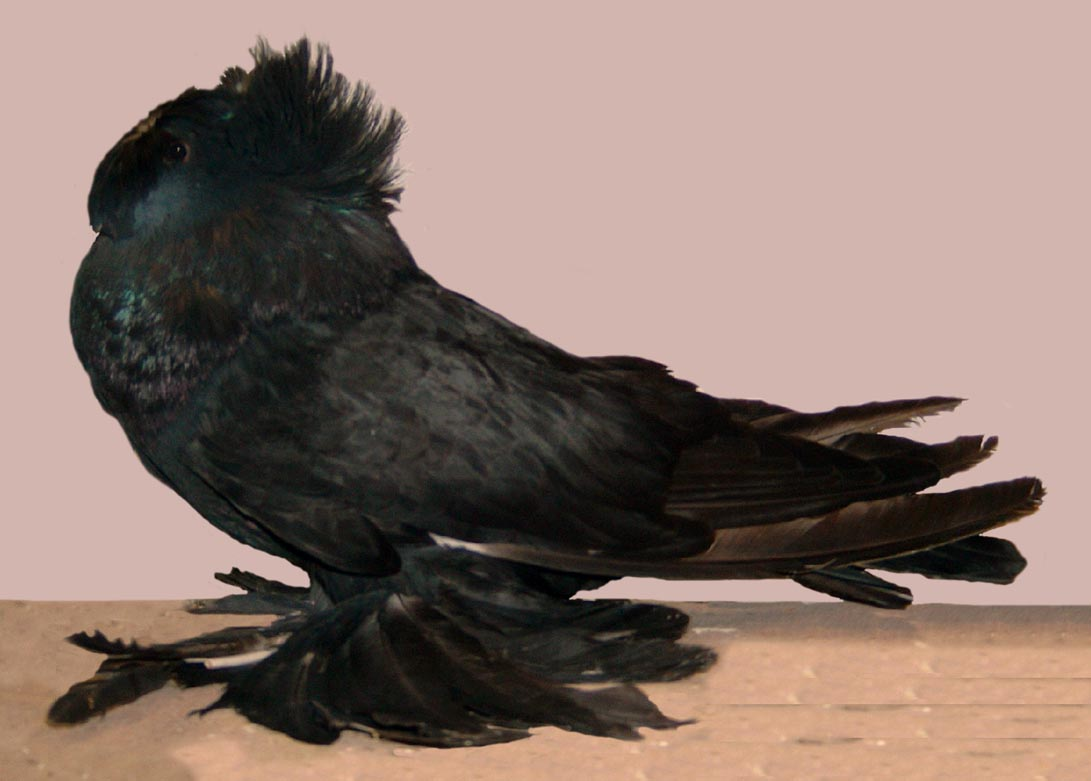
Bokhara Trumpeter

- Arabian Trumpeter
- Bokhara Trumpeter
- Dresden Trumpeter
- Altenburger Trumpeter
- English Trumpeter
- Franconian Trumpeter
- Bangladeshi Trumpeter

== See also ==
- List of pigeon breeds
