= Sivas (disambiguation) =

Sivas is a city in Turkey.

Sivas may also refer to:

- Sivas (electoral district), Grand National Assembly of Turkey
- Sivas Province, Turkey
- Sivas Airport, Sivas, Turkey
- Sivas Congress, 1919 assembly of the Turkish National Movement
- Sivas Vilayet, Ottoman Empire
- Sivas massacre, events of July 2, 1993 against Turkish Alevi intellectuals
- Sivas (film), a 2014 Turkish film
- Sivas (rapper), a Danish rapper

== See also ==
- Sivas Kumru Güvercin, or Sivas Dove Pigeon, quite petite pigeon originated from Turkey
- Sivas (rapper), stylized as S!vas (real name Sivas Torbati), Danish rapper of Iranian origin
- Siva (disambiguation)
