= Altenburg Trumpeter =

Breed of pigeon

Altenburger Trumpeter
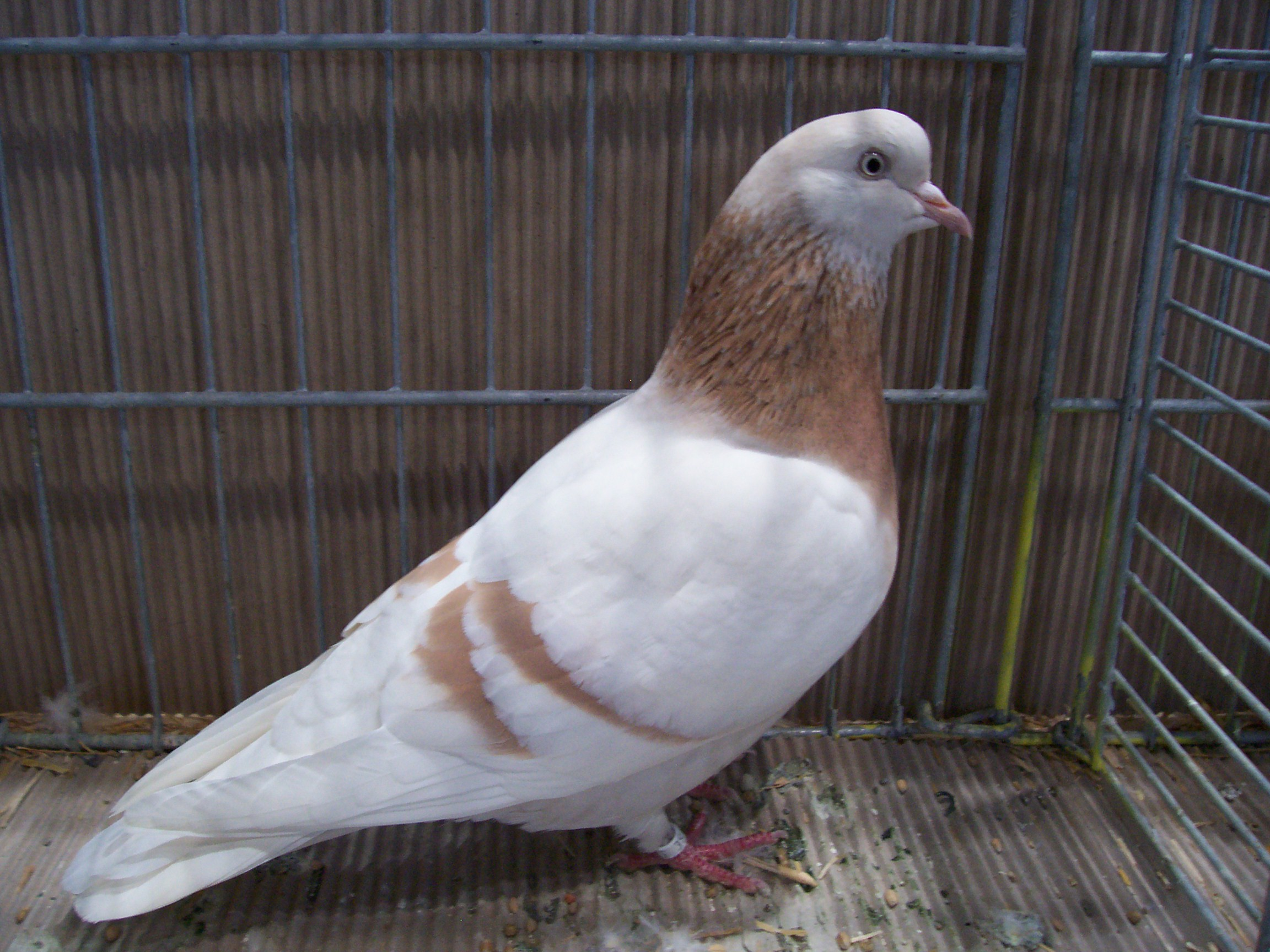
- Cream Bar
- Conservation status: Common

Classification
- Australian Breed Group: Asian feather and voice pigeons
- US Breed Group: Fancy pigeons
- EE Breed Group: Trumpeter pigeons

Notes
- Known for special vocalization that the pigeon makes

The Altenburger Trumpeter is a breed of fancy pigeon developed over many years of selective breeding. Altenburger Trumpeters along with other breeds of domesticated pigeons are all descendants from the rock pigeon (Columba livia). There are several breeds of trumpeter pigeons which are known for their vocal cooing which sounds similar to laughter or trumpeting. The breeds with this ability are collectively known as "voice" pigeons.

== Basic Needs ==
- Pigeon Diet
- Pigeon Housing
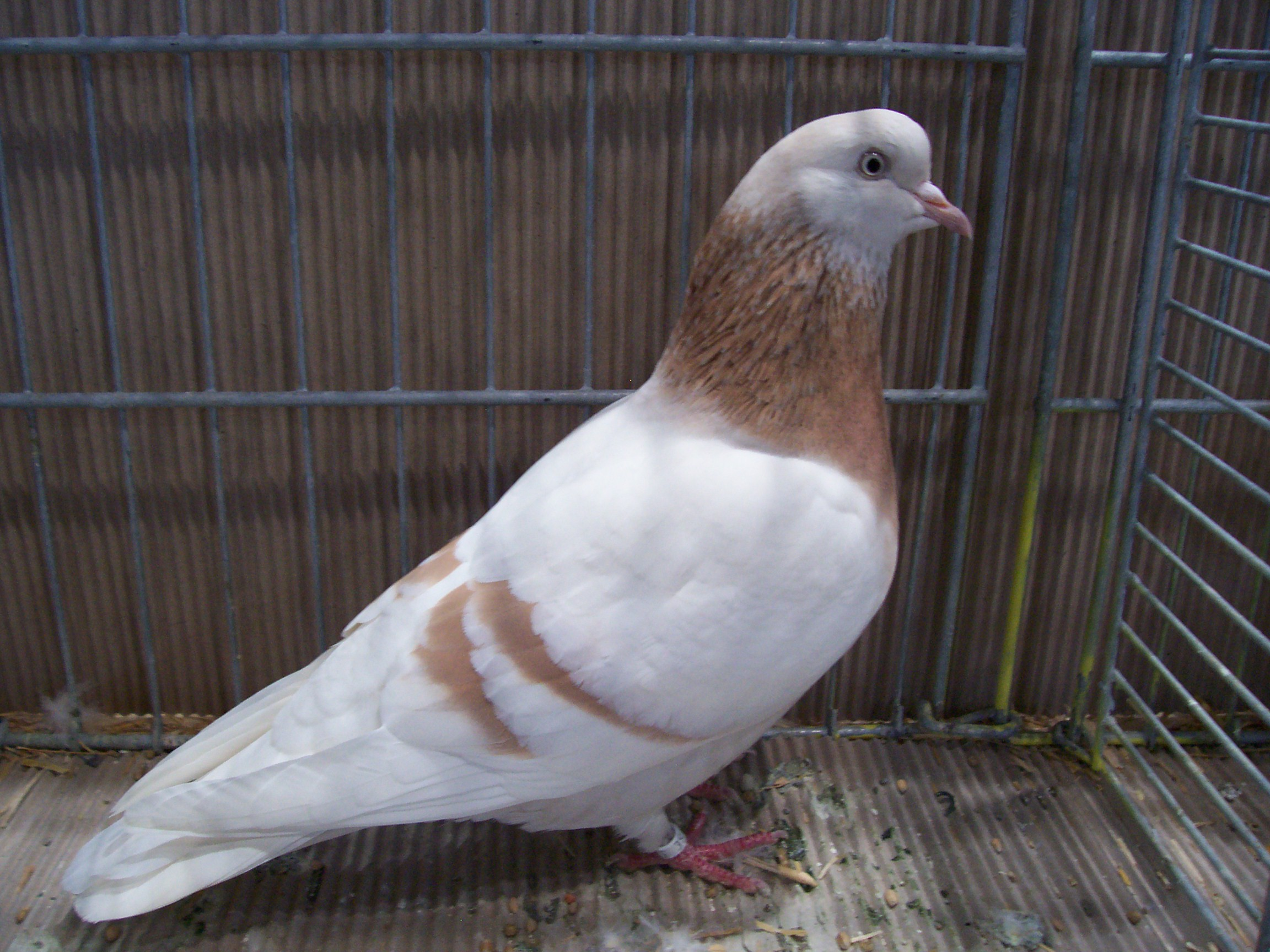
Yellow Bar Altenburg Trumpeter

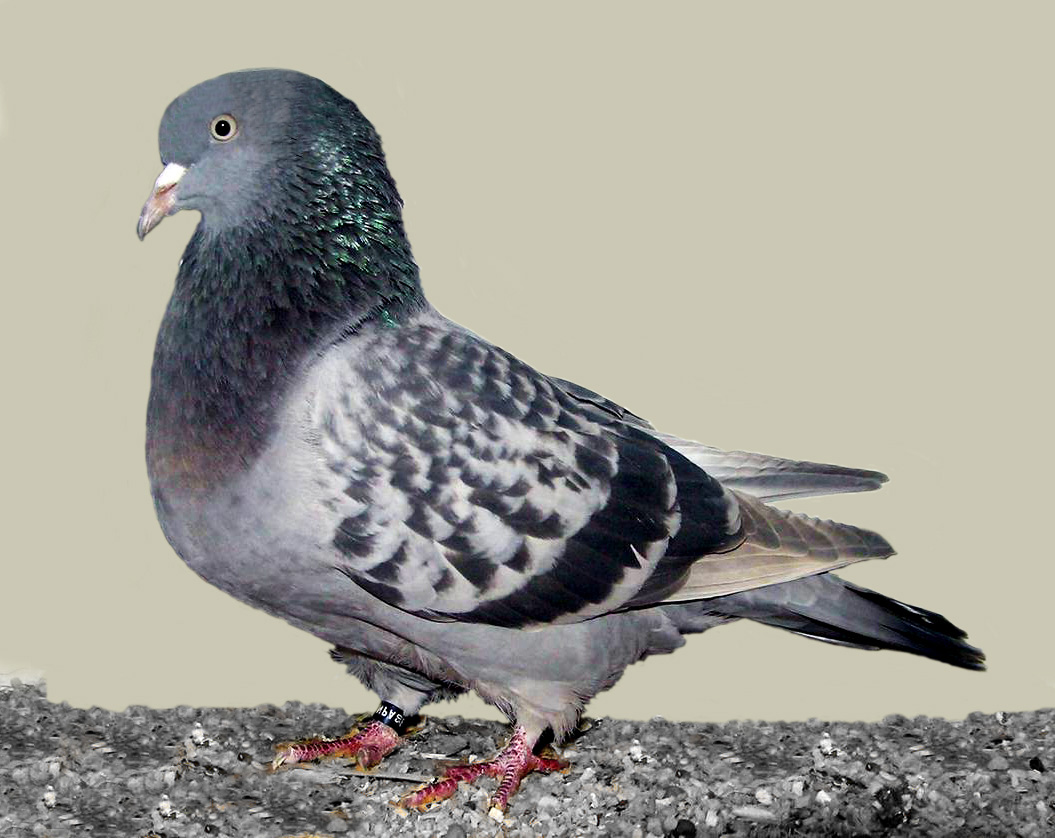
Blue Check Altenburg_Trumpeter

== See also ==
- List of pigeon breeds
- Bokhara Trumpeter
