= Arabian Trumpeter =

Breed of pigeon

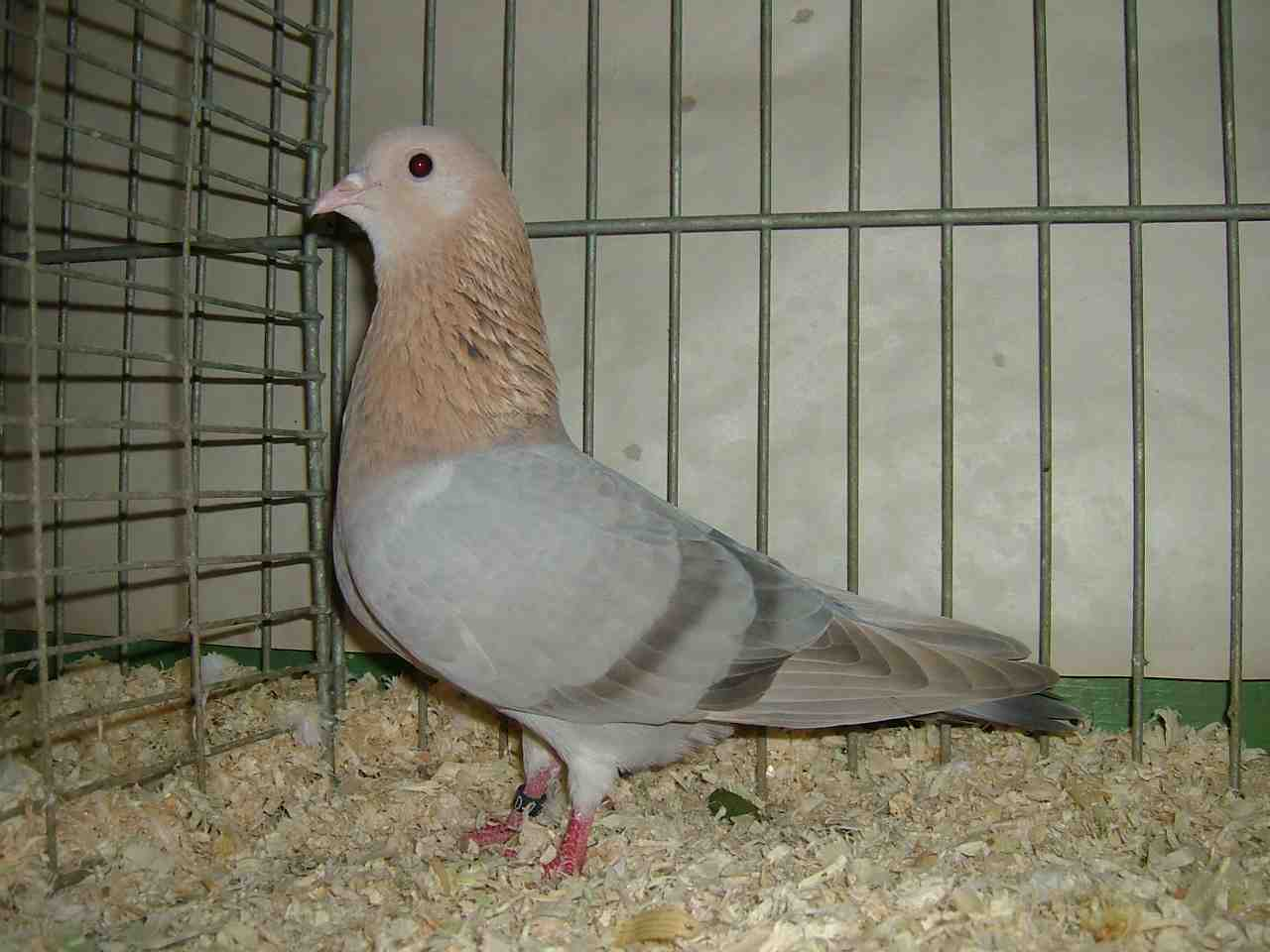
- Arabian Trumpeter
- Conservation status: Common
- Country of origin: Bangladesh

Classification
- Australian Breed Group: Asian feather and voice pigeons
- US Breed Group: Fancy pigeons
- EE Breed Group: Trumpeter pigeons

Notes
- These birds are bred for their unique vocalizations

The Arabian Trumpeter is a breed of fancy pigeon developed over many years of selective breeding. Arabian Trumpeters, along with other varieties of domesticated pigeons, are all descendants from the rock pigeon (Columba livia). There are several breeds of trumpeter pigeons which are known for their vocal cooing which sounds similar to laughter or trumpeting. The breeds with this ability are collectively known as "voice" pigeons.

== Gallery ==
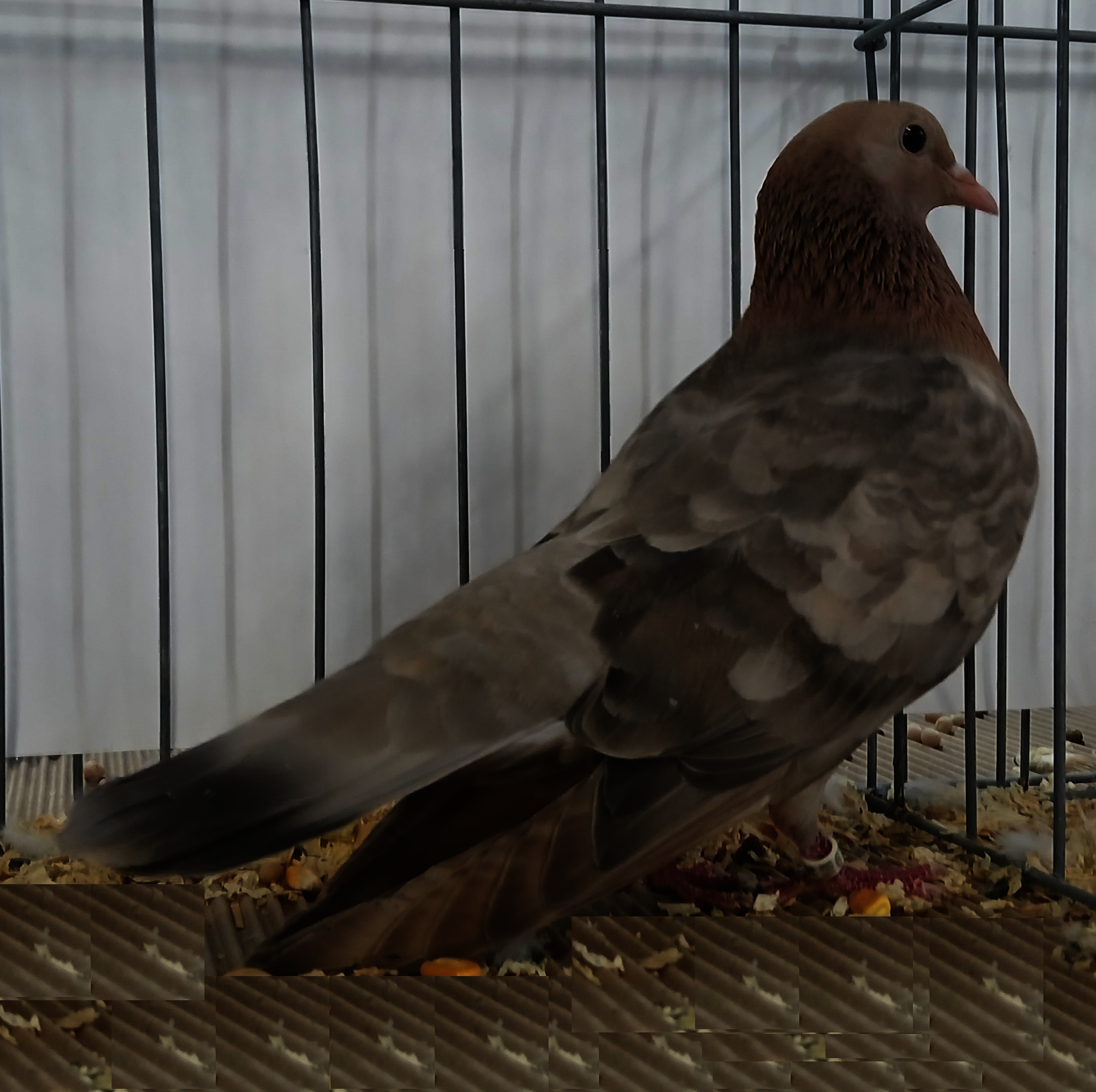
Brown Check

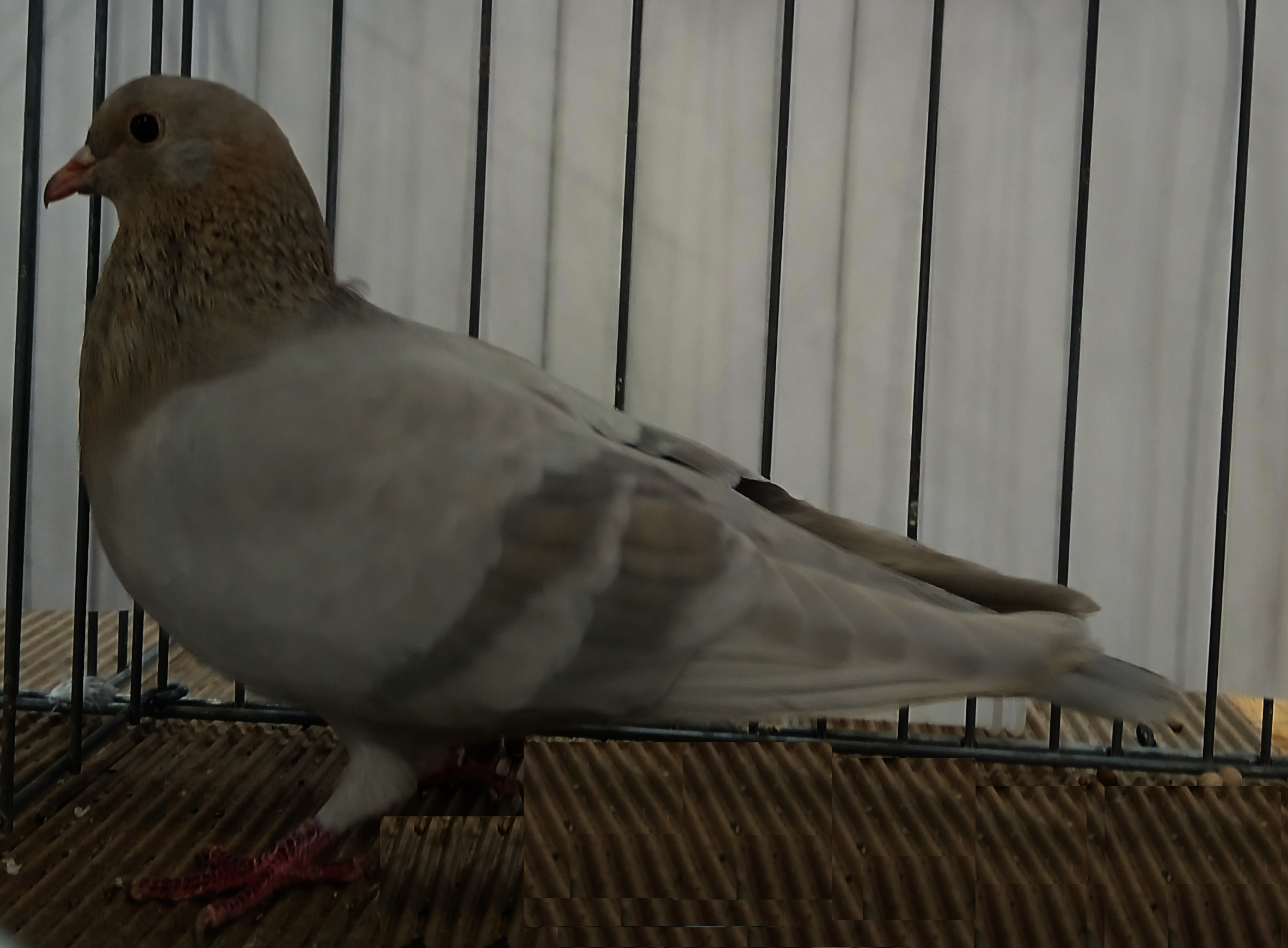
Dilute bar

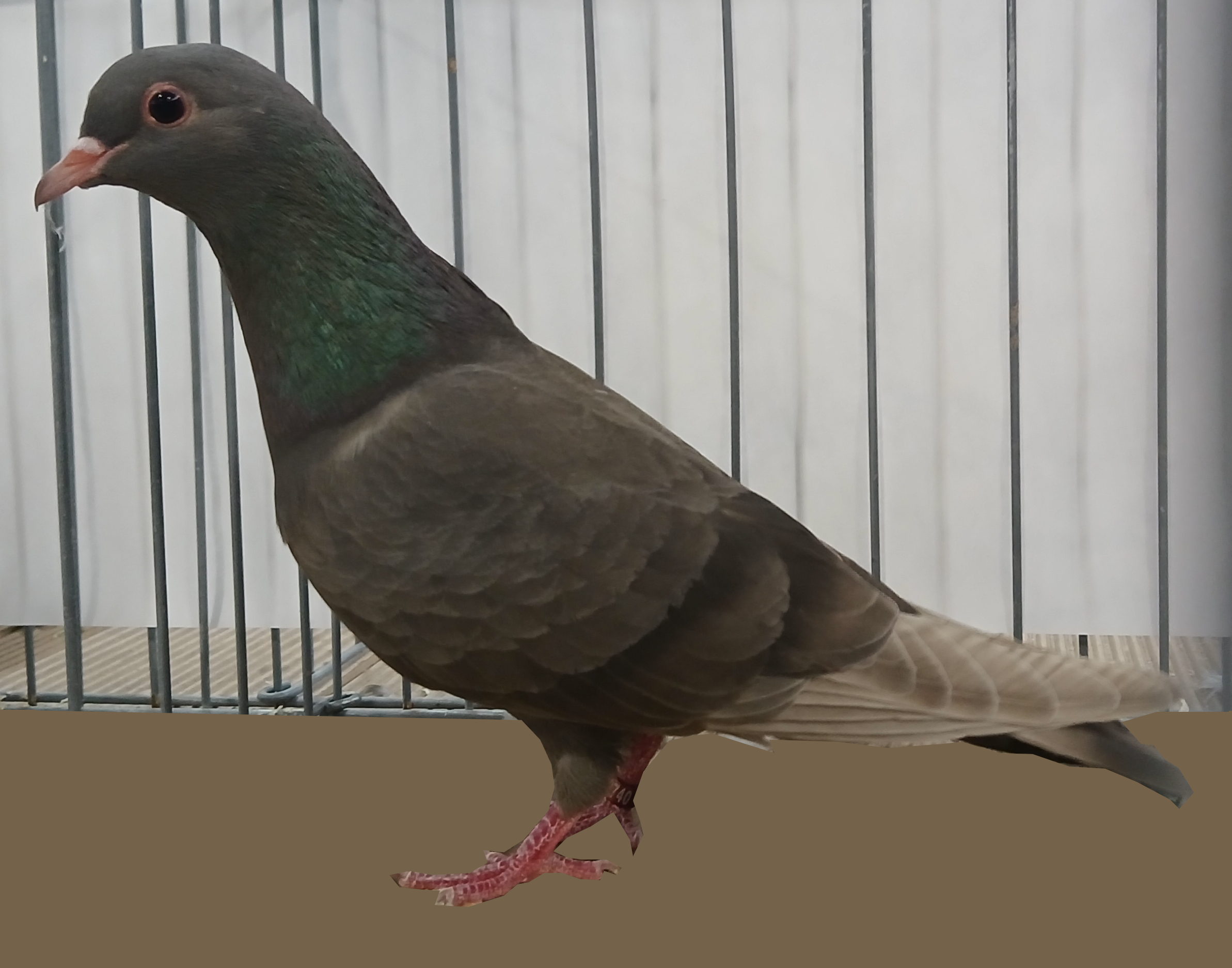
Brown

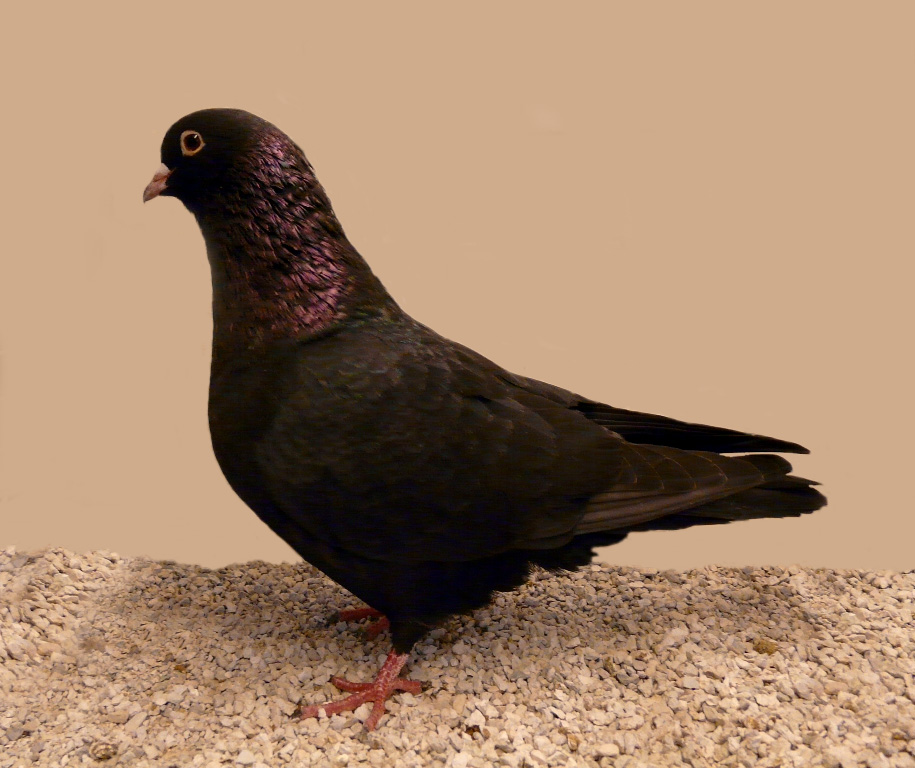
Black

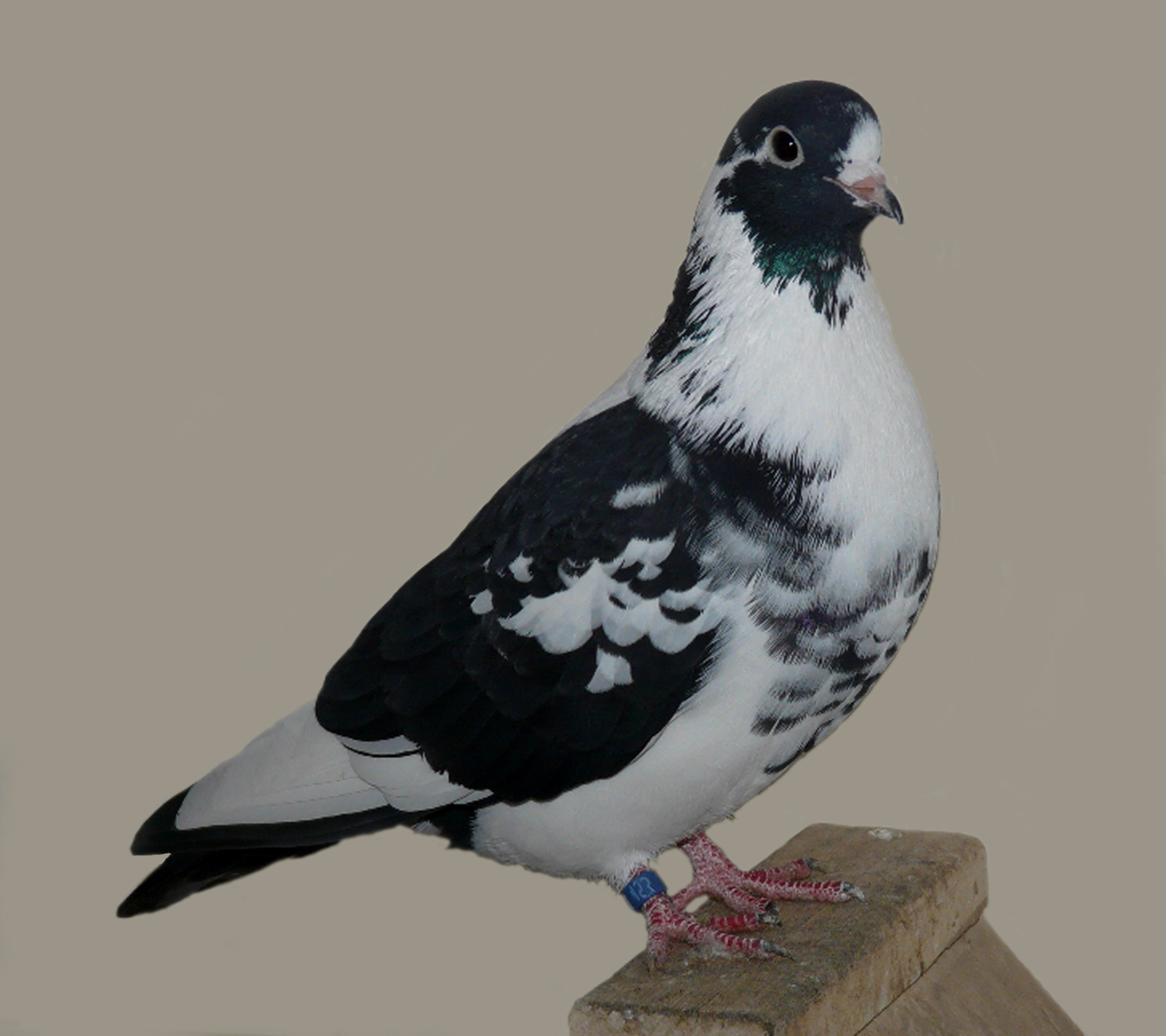
Black spangle

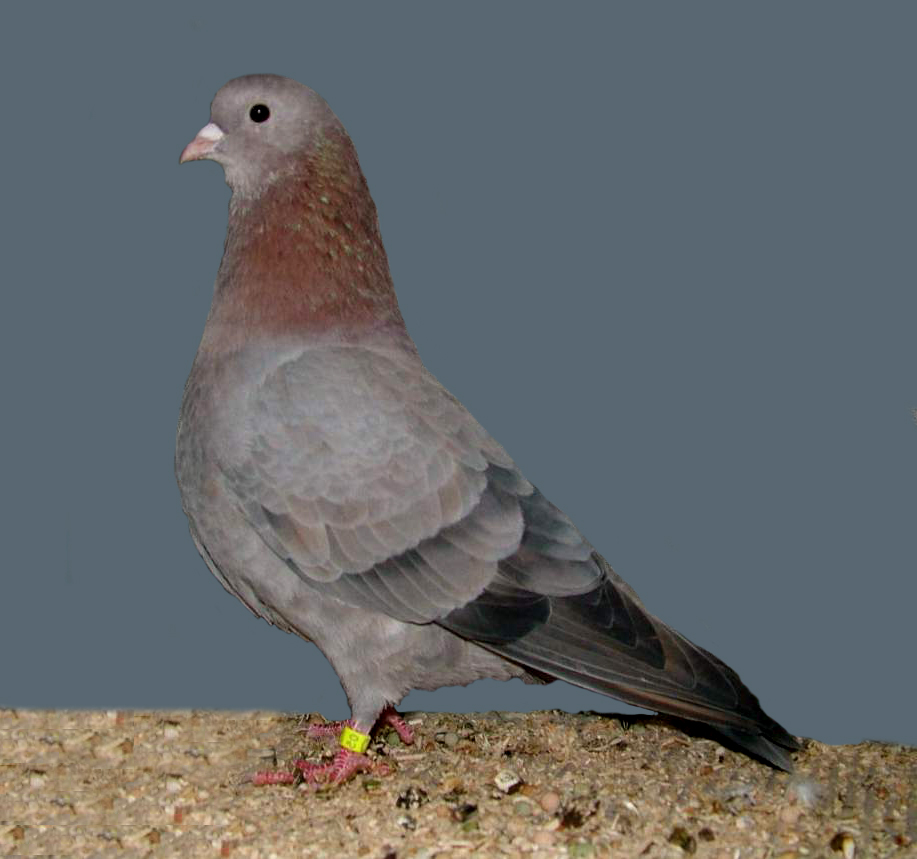
Red atlas

== See also ==
- Pigeon Diet
- Pigeon Housing
- List of pigeon breeds
- Bokhara Trumpeter
