= Dresden Trumpeter =

Breed of pigeon

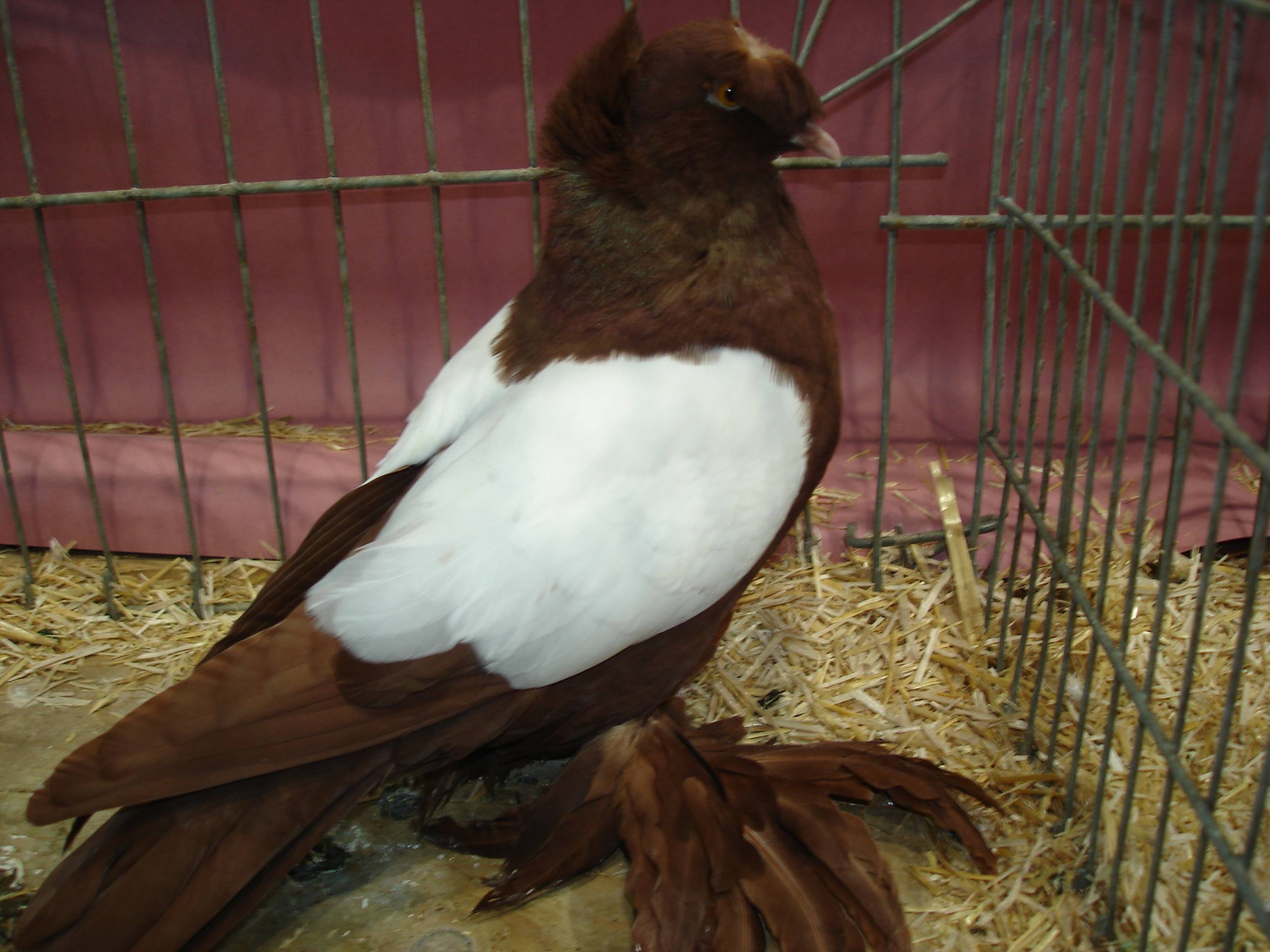
- Dresden Trumpeter
- Conservation status: Common
- Country of origin: Germany

Classification
- Australian Breed Group: Asian feather and voice pigeons
- US Breed Group: Fancy pigeons
- EE Breed Group: Trumpeter pigeons

Notes
- A pigeon bred for both voice and exhibition.

The Dresden Trumpeter is a breed of fancy pigeon developed over many years of selective breeding.

== Origin ==
Saxony, in the region of Dresden.

=== Overall Impression ===
Only slightly sturdier than the Field Pigeon, low carriage, a rather long than short effect required. White wing shield. Double-crested.

- Head: Not quite so powerful as the double-crested Trumpeter. The shell crest should be broad and unbroken. The beak crest should be somewhat oval in shape, as unbroken as possible all round; the larger, forward part covering the beak wattles and requiring some foundation to avoid unsightly hanging.
- Eyes: Dark orange iris, somewhat lighter iris allowed in reds and yellows. Cere fine, flesh-coloured.
- Beak: Dark in blacks, flesh-coloured in reds and yellows; in reds a somewhat darker tinge is permitted.
- Neck: Short, fairly rounded, throat full, rounded.
- Breast: Broad as possible, full and pressed well forward.
- Back: Fairly broad at the shoulder, slightly sloping.
- Wings: Fairly broad, with long primaries reaching almost to the end of the tail.
- Tail: Long.
- Legs: Thighs well feathered. Feet thick and full-muffed. However, muff feathers should not be excessively long. Muffs must spread to the side rather than to the front.

=== Colours ===
Red and yellow, very occasionally black.

=== Markings ===
White wing shields. All other feathers coloured.

=== Defects ===
Thin or weak body, upright stance; too much of a blue tinge in the colouring, white feathers in the primaries, muffs, tail, thighs and head; distorted beak crest; narrow, distorted or incomplete shell crest; muffs which are too short or full of gaps. Order of Evaluation: Overall Impression - body size - carriage - markings - head adornment.

== See also ==
- List of pigeon breeds
