= Bokhara Trumpeter =

Breed of pigeon

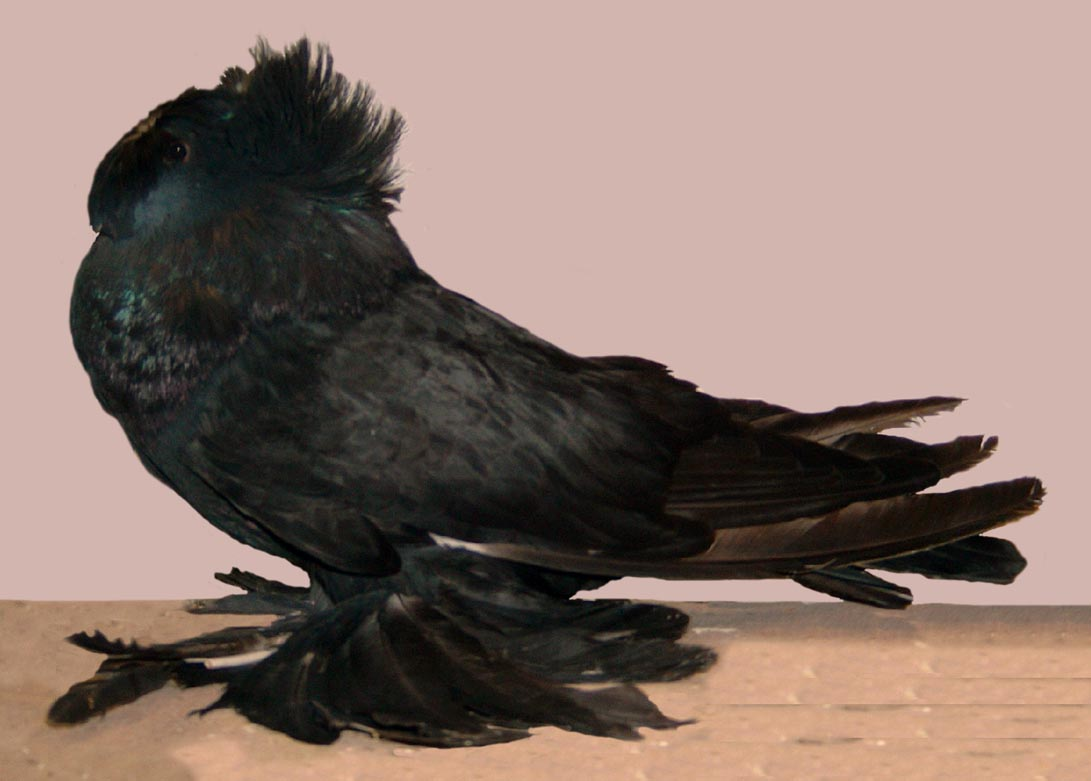
- Black Self Bokhara Trumpeter
- Conservation status: Common
- Other names: Russian trumpeter
- Nicknames: Boks
- Country of origin: England

Classification
- Australian Breed Group: Asian feather and voice pigeons
- US Breed Group: Fancy pigeons
- EE Breed Group: Trumpeter pigeons

Notes
- Originally cultivated for voice but now cultivated for feather ornaments

The Bokhara Trumpeter is a breed of fancy pigeon developed over many years of selective breeding. Bokhara Trumpeters, along with other varieties of domesticated pigeons, are all descendants of the rock dove (Columba livia). The breed is known for its long muffed (feathered) feet and double crest.

One of the most popular breeds of Trumpeter in the U.S.. The American Pigeon Journal focused on the breed with a special in May 1976. The Bokhara Trumpeter is most noticeably characterized by its lengthy full muffs (feathers on the feet) and double crest which completely obscures the bird's eyes and gives it a look reminiscent of the Old English Sheepdog. The trumpeting breeds of pigeon are so named because of their unique vocalizations which sound vaguely like low laughter.

Wendell Levi describes this trumpeting vocalization in his book The Pigeon.

== Gallery ==
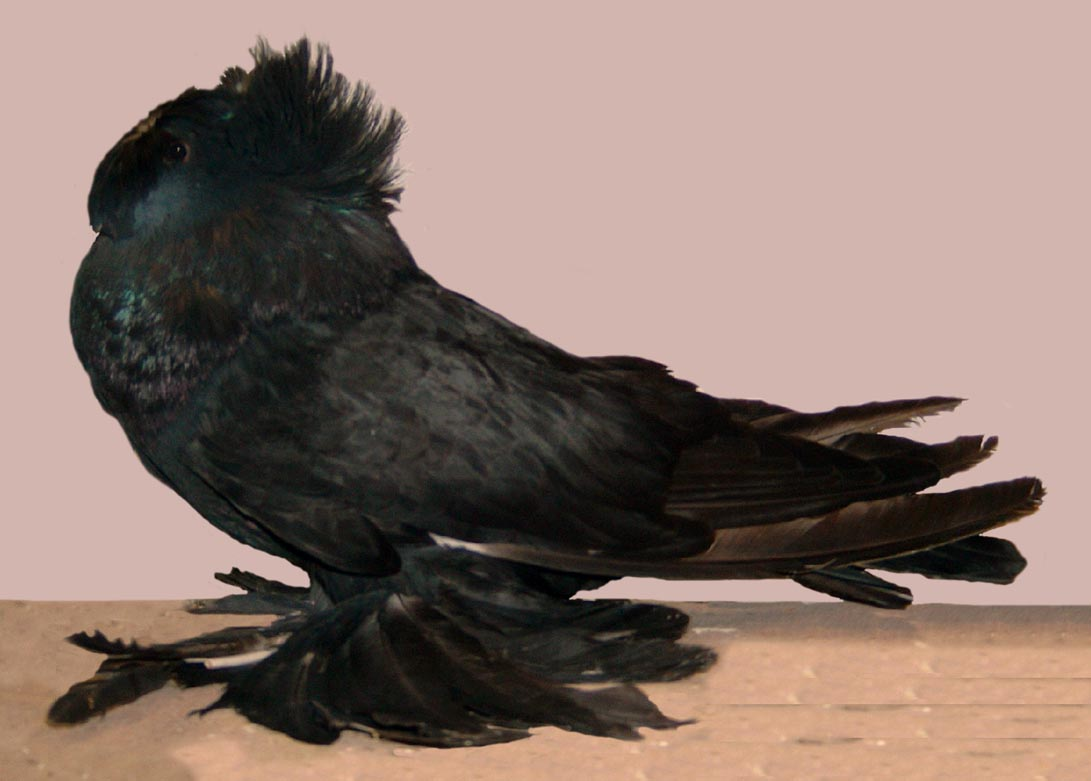
Black

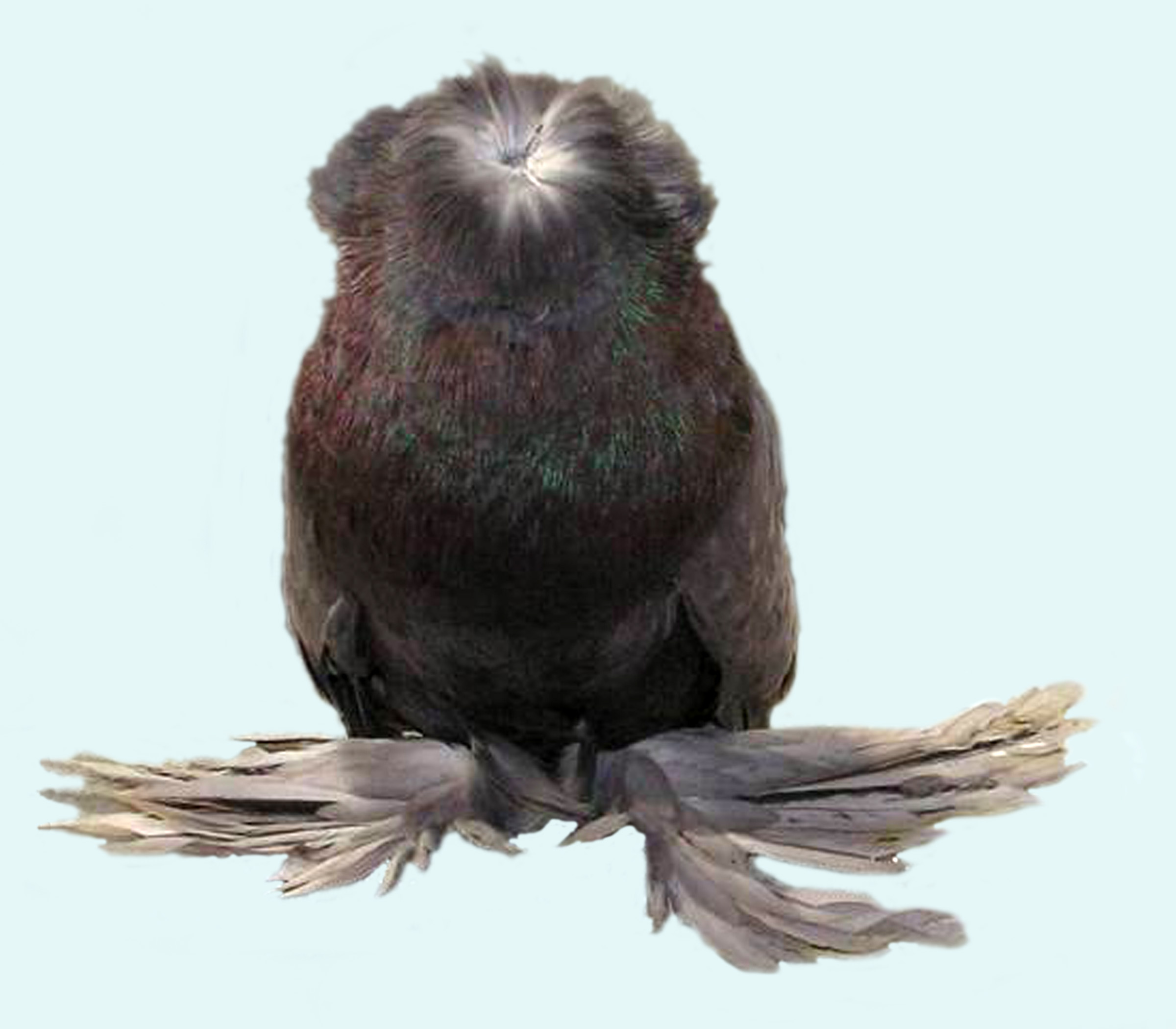
Red

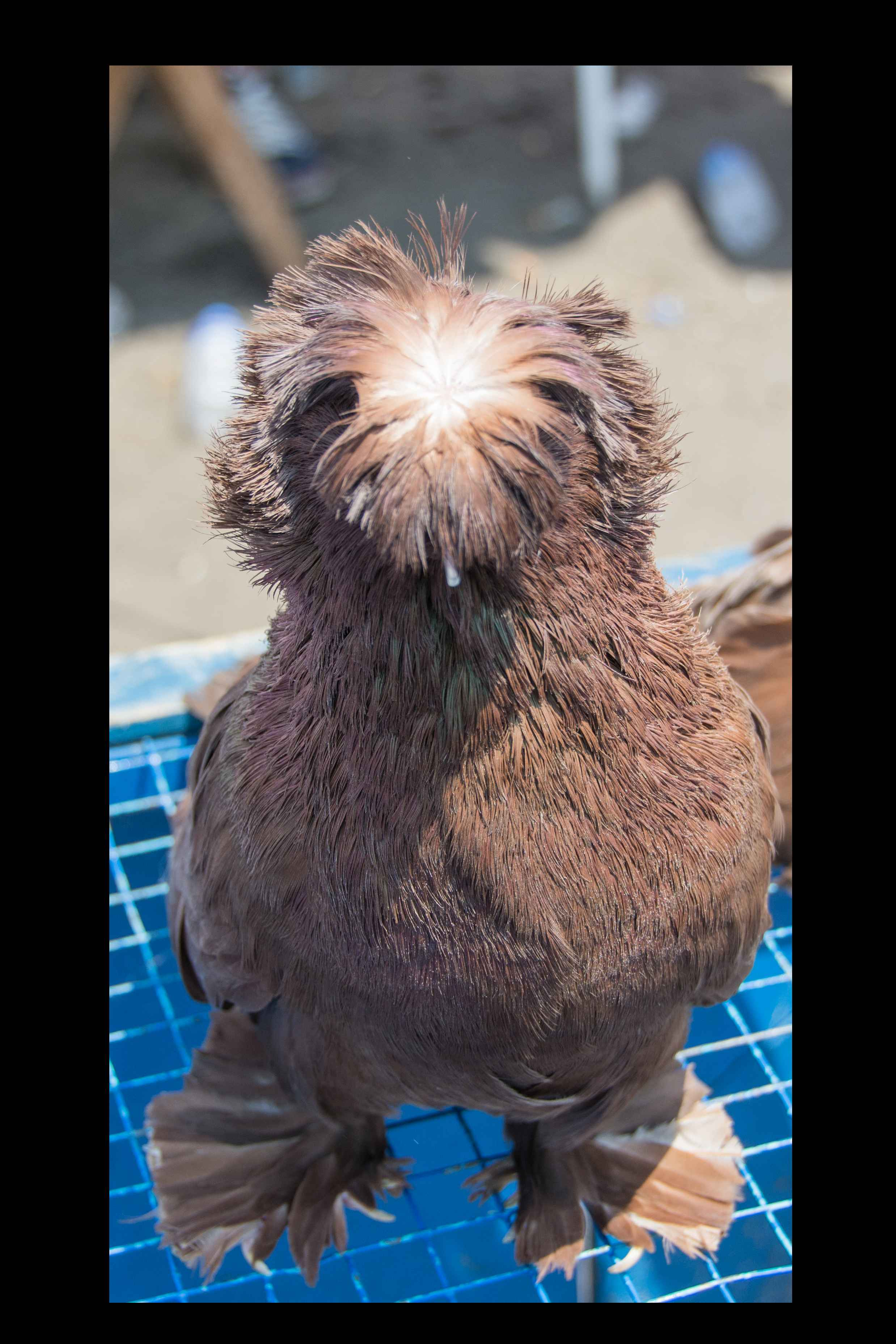
Front View

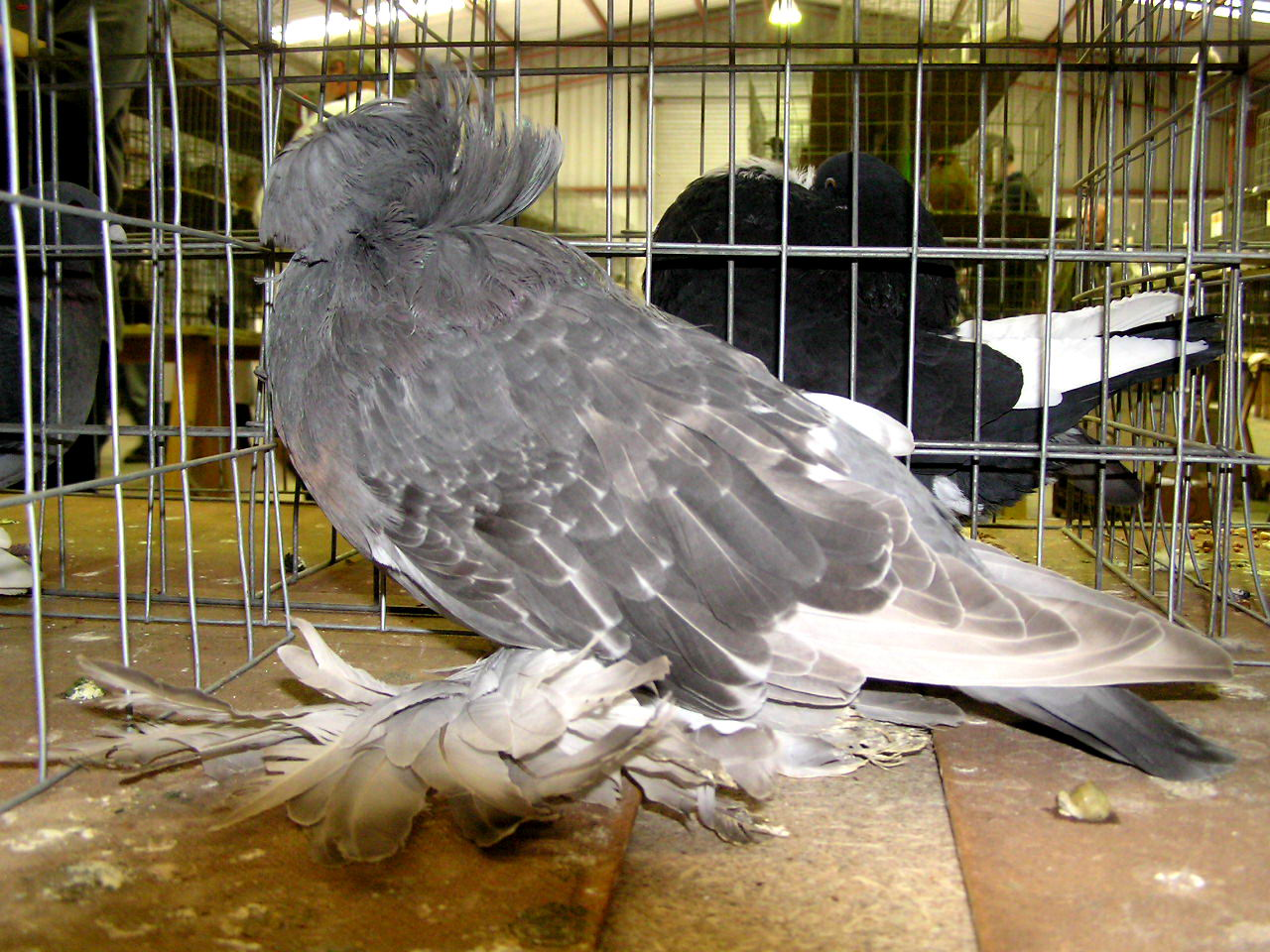
Check

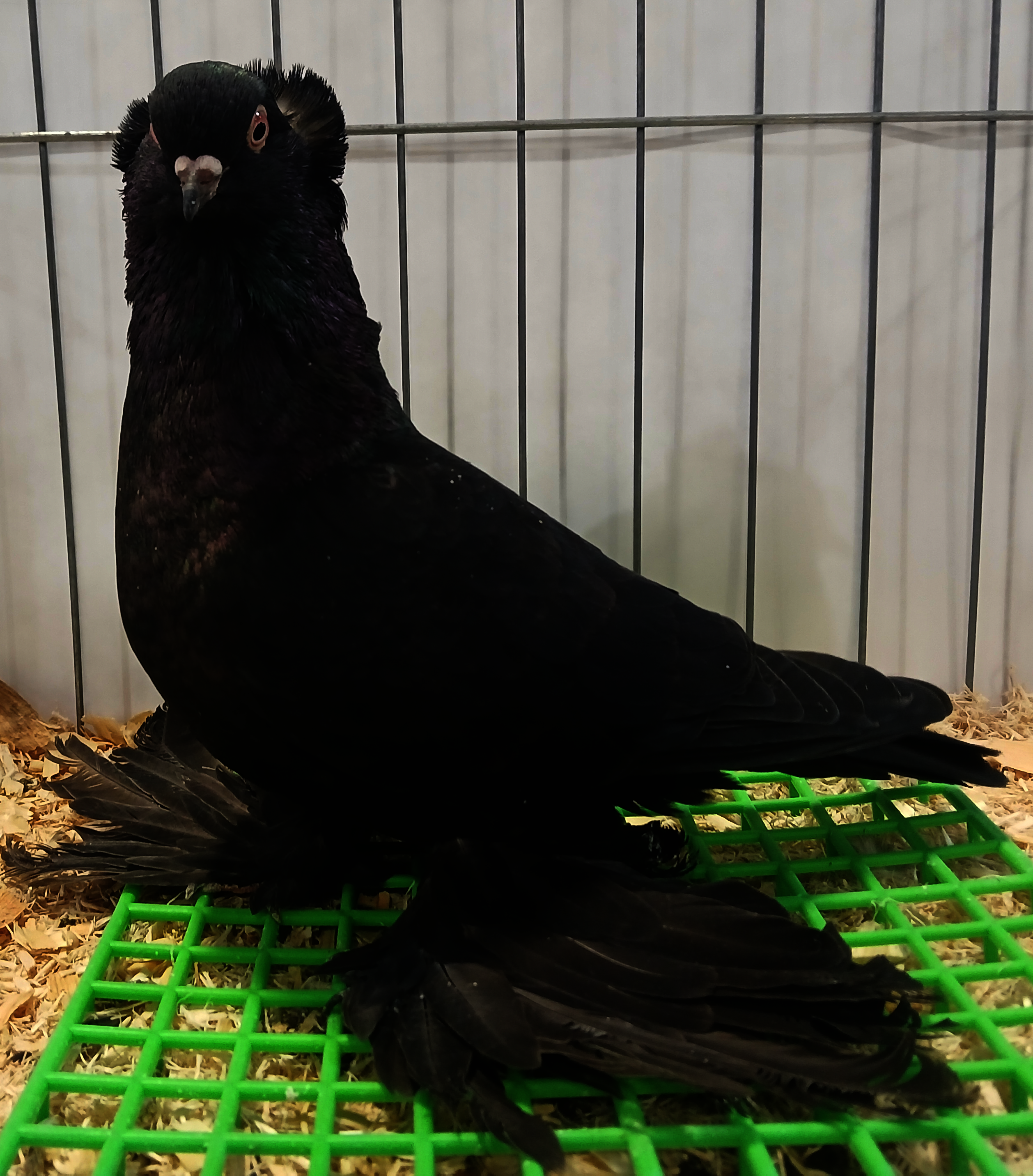
Black NPA show 2026

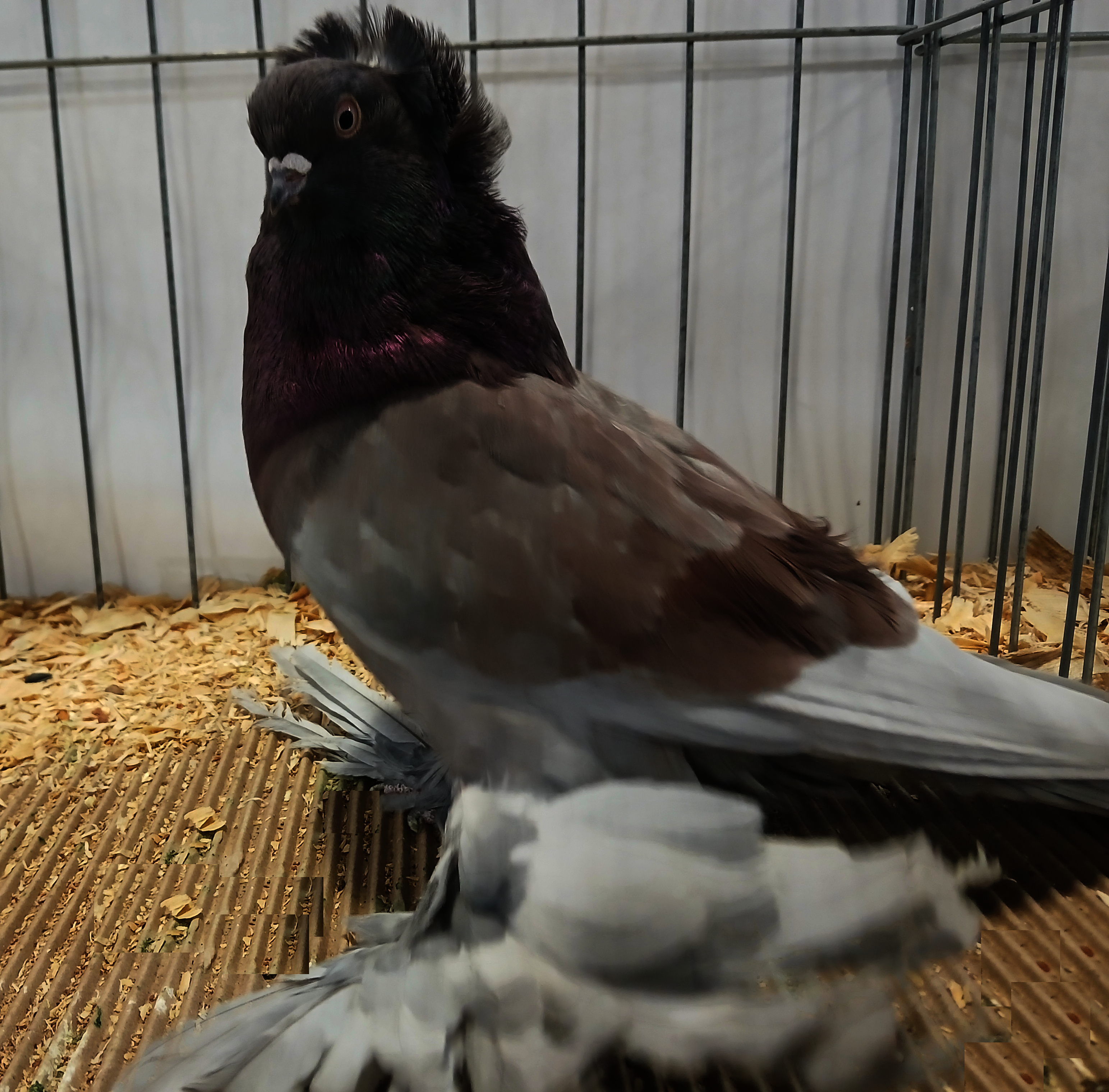
Red check NPA show 2026

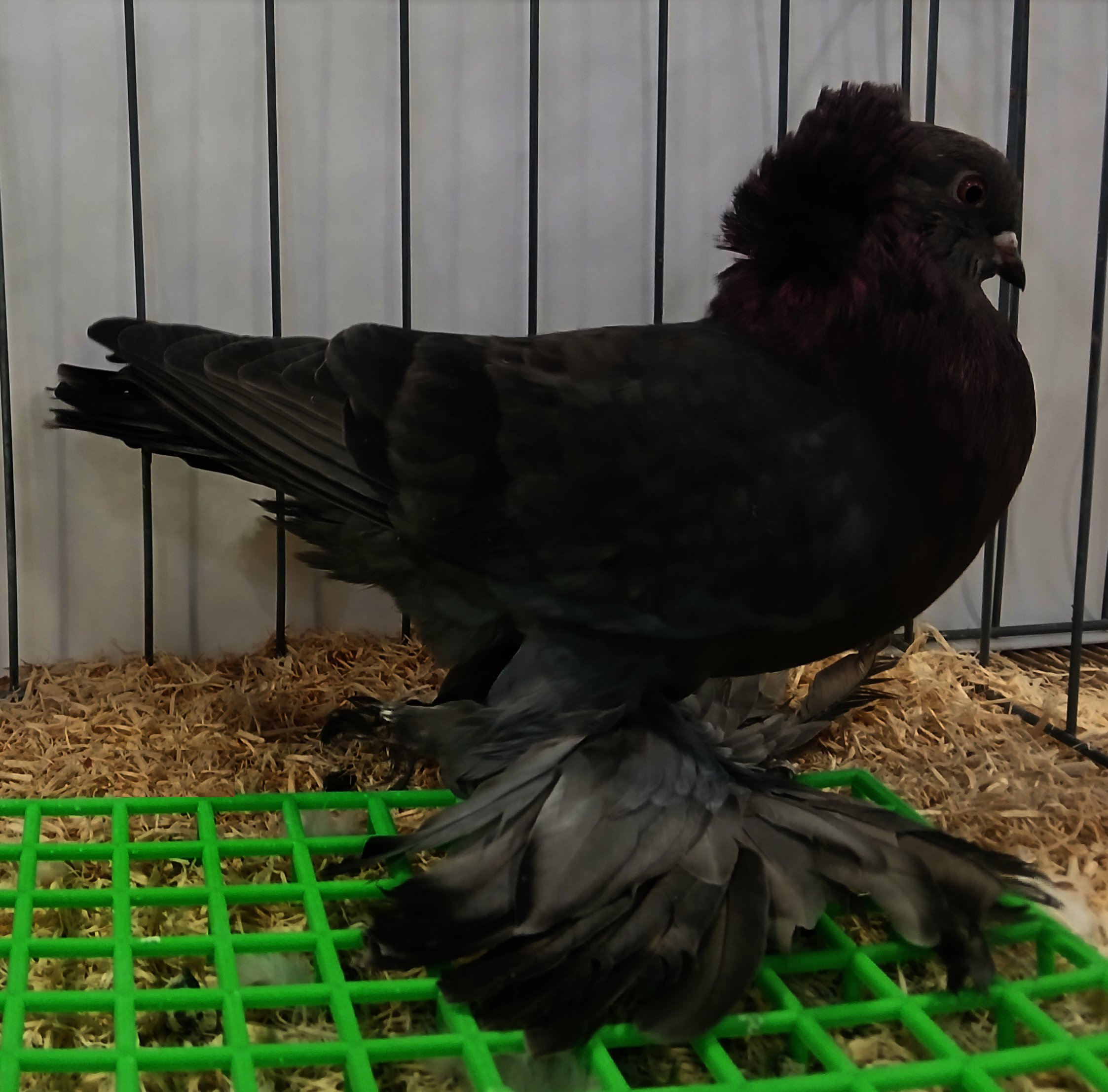
Brown NPA show 2026

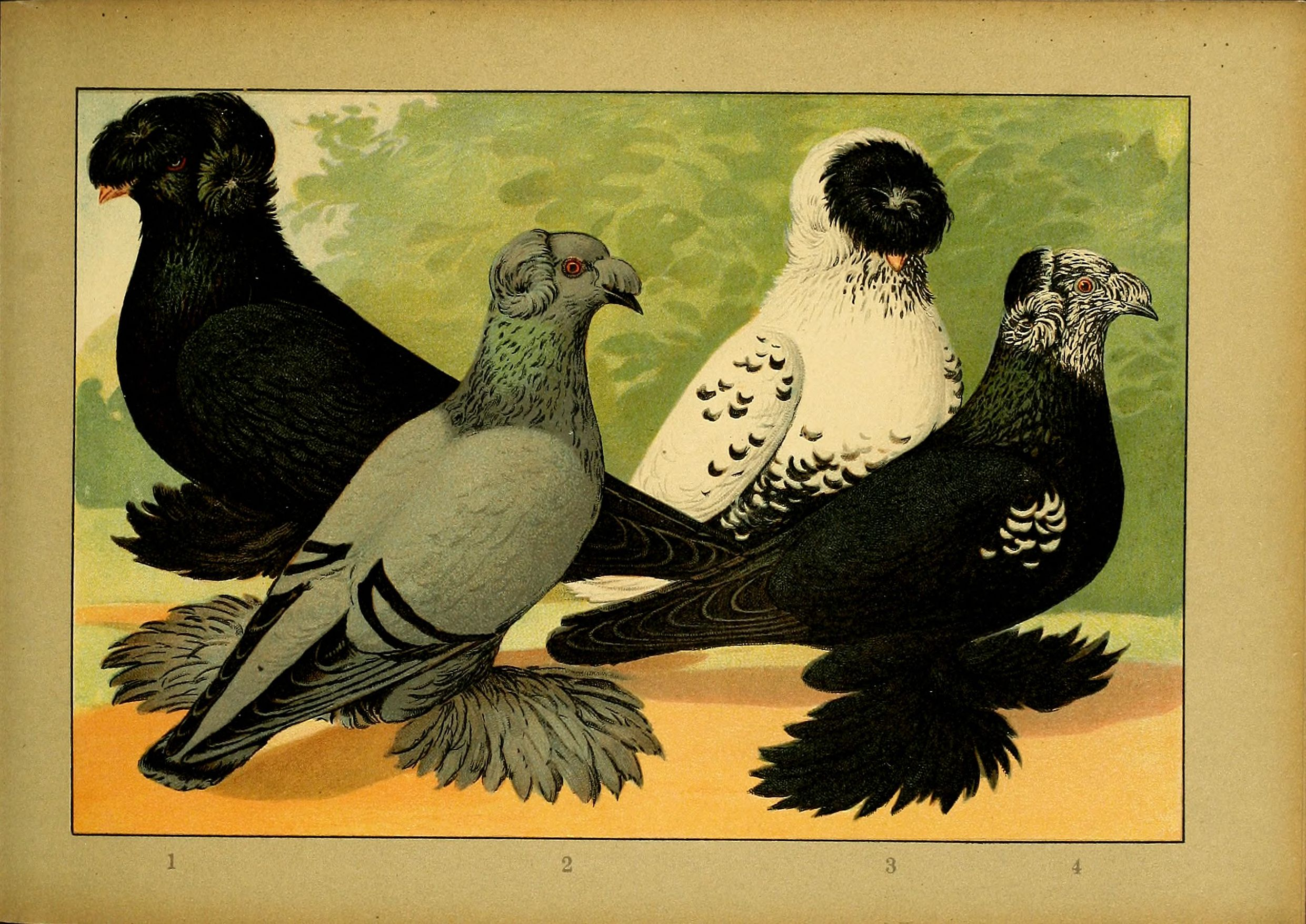
Schachtzabel 1906 Tafel 45

== See also ==
- Pigeon Diet
- Pigeon Housing
- Arabian Trumpeter
- List of pigeon breeds
