= English Trumpeter =

Breed of pigeon

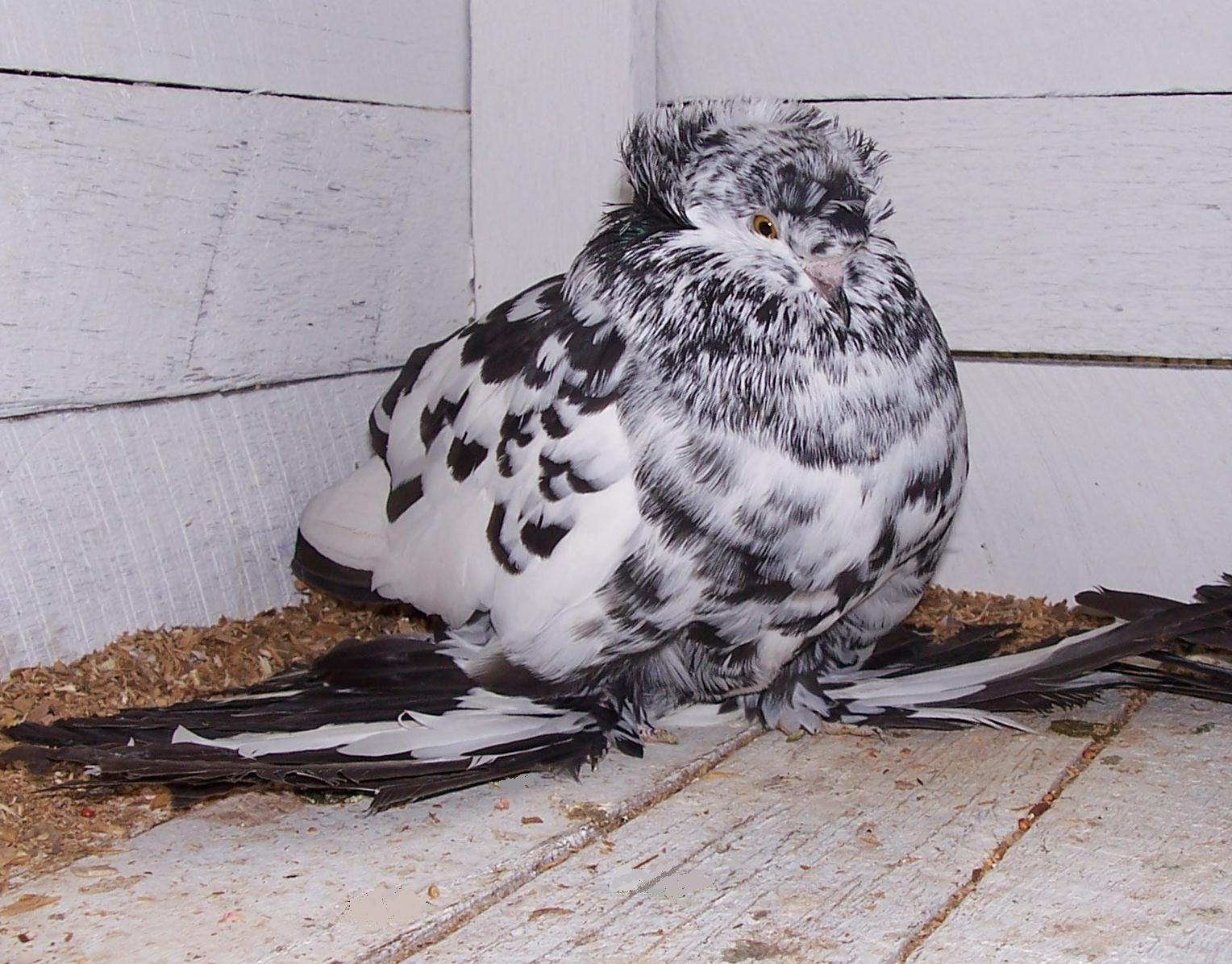
- English Trumpeter
- Conservation status: Common
- Country of origin: England

Classification
- Australian Breed Group: Asian feather and voice pigeons
- US Breed Group: Fancy pigeons
- EE Breed Group: Trumpeter pigeons

Notes
- While this breed originated in England it has been much altered by fanciers in the US.

The English Trumpeter is a breed of fancy pigeon developed over many years of selective breeding. English Trumpeters, along with other varieties of domesticated pigeons, are all descendants from the rock pigeon (Columba livia). This is one of the most popular breeds in the USA. The English Trumpeter is regarded as one of the most ornamental breeds of fancy pigeon. The most distinguishing feature of this breed are the very large muffs on its feet, which often grow to sizes close to its flight-feathers. Combining a tuft, crest and large muffs on their feet, they are challenging to breed. They are bred in a number of colours which are listed under self, splash and baldhead.

== Origin ==
The name is misleading, as this breed as known today as an American creation.

== Gallery ==
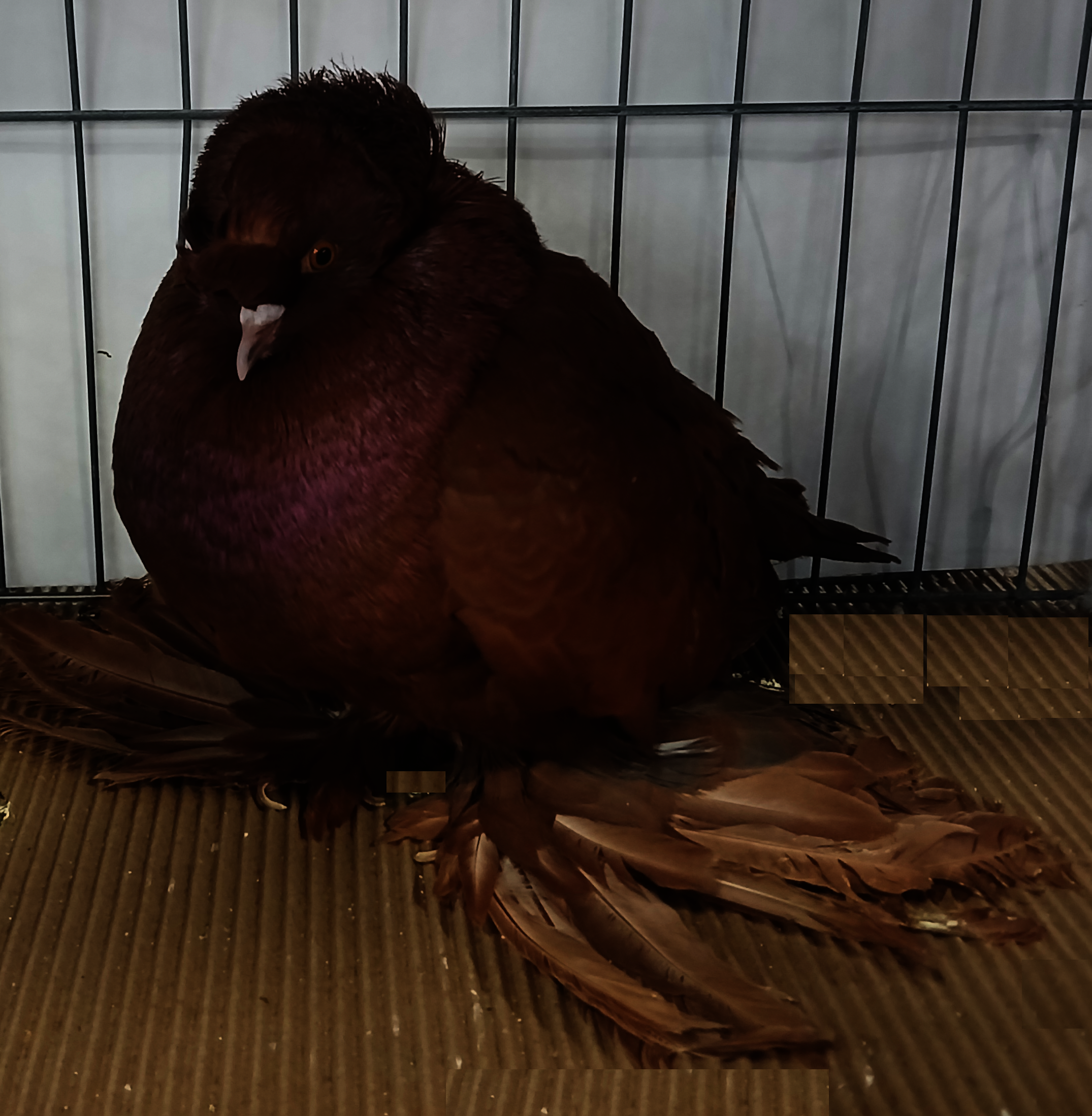
Red

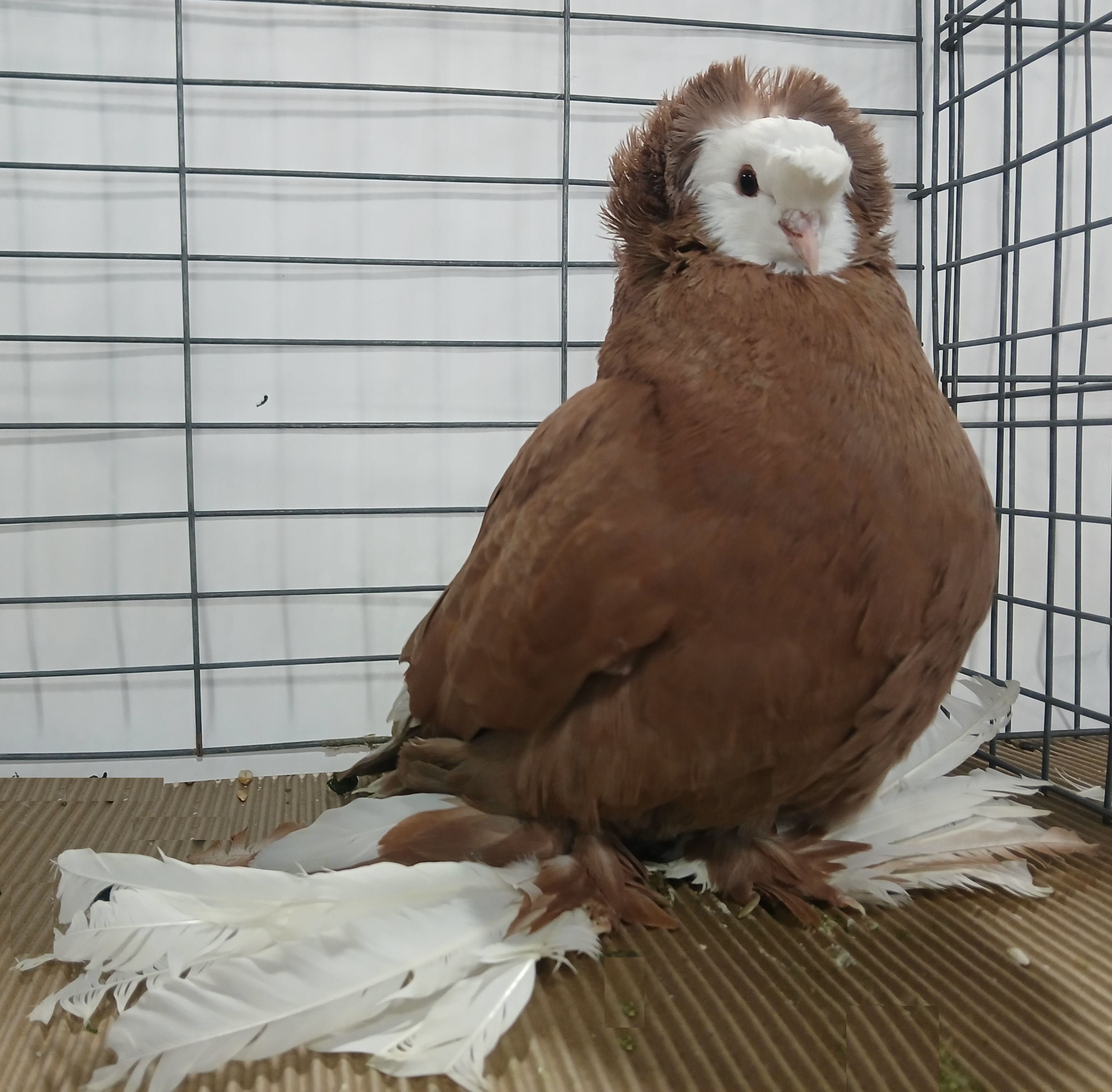
Red baldhead

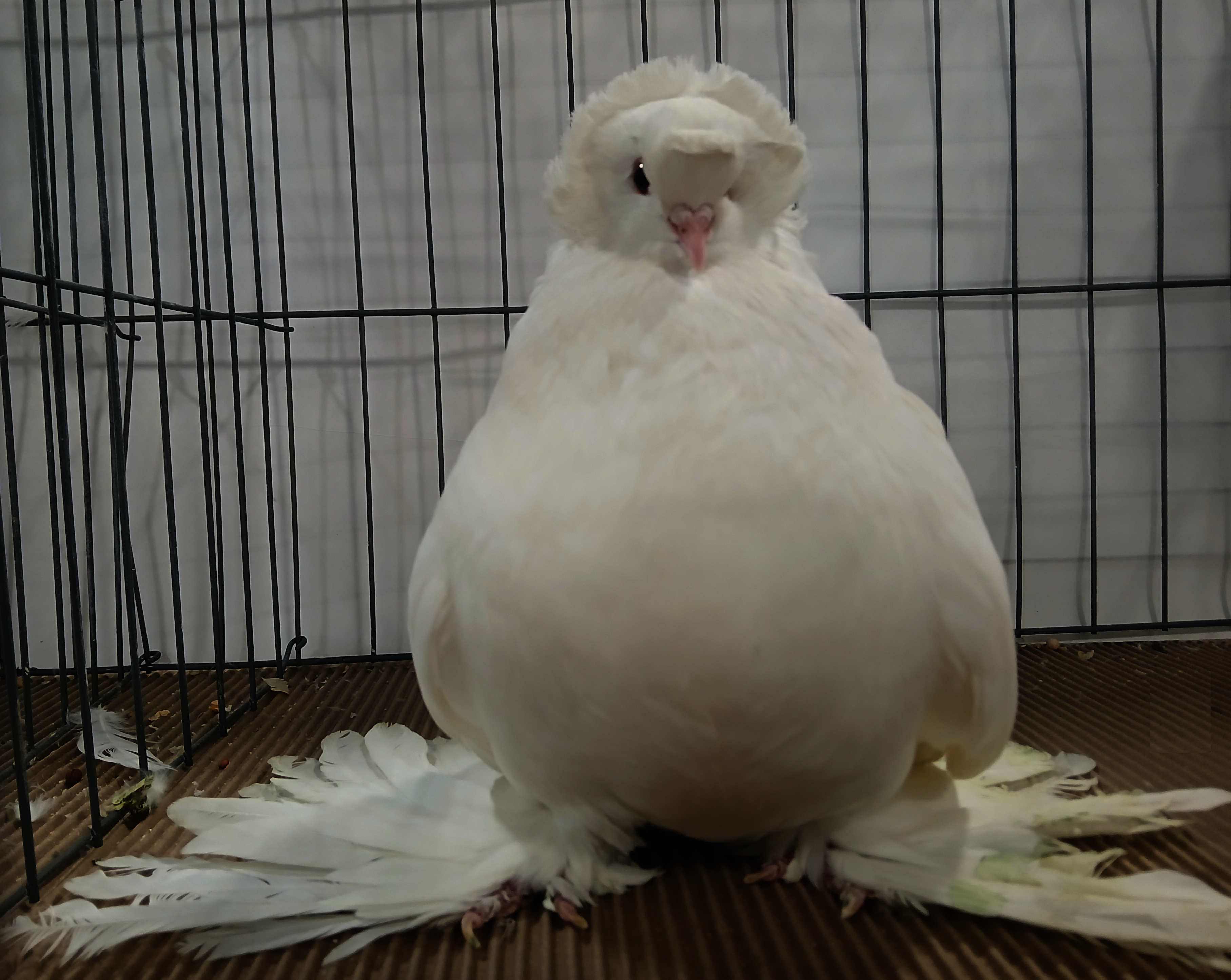
White

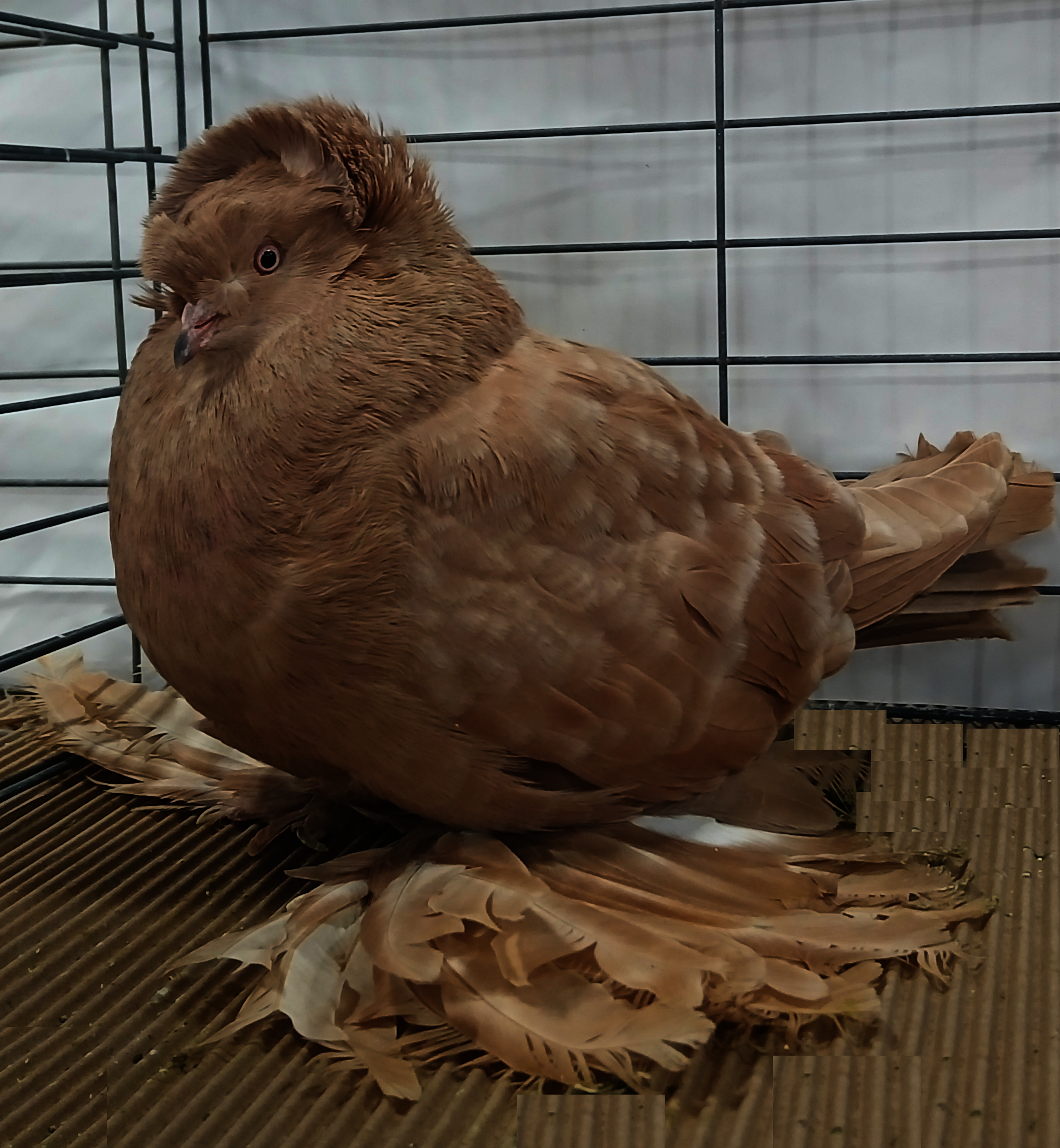
Yellow

== See also ==
- Pigeon Diet
- Pigeon Housing
- List of pigeon breeds
