= Parisian pouter =

Extinct breed of pigeon

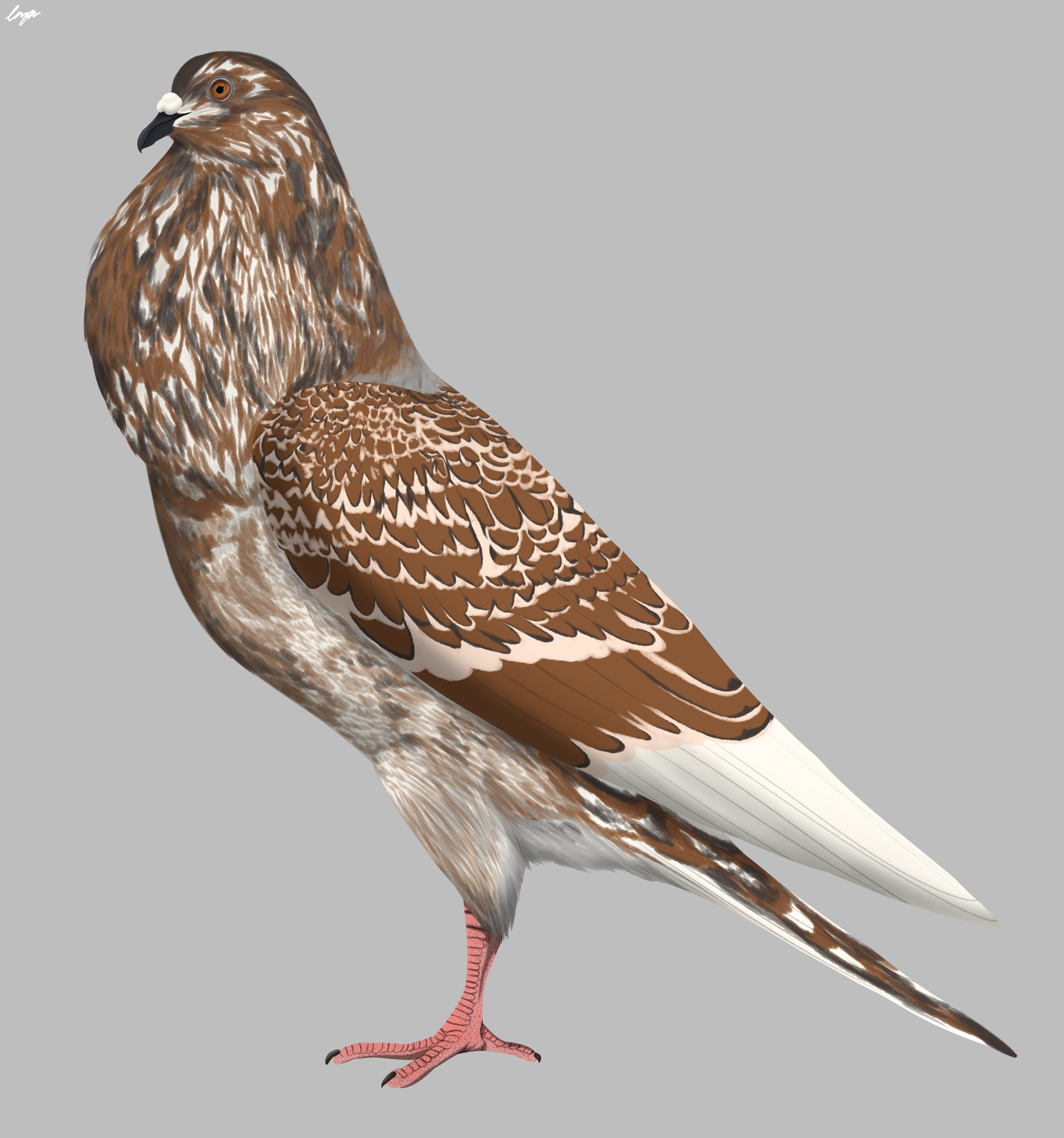
- A digitally illustrated reconstruction of the Parisian pouter based on historic accounts.
- Conservation status: Extinct
- Other names: Parisian cropper, Parisian powter, Parazence pouter
- Country of origin: France

Classification

The Parisian pouter, interchangeably referred to as the Parisian cropper, historically spelled as the Parisian powter, and informally referred to as the Parazence pouter, was a domestic breed of fancy pigeon descended from the rock dove (Columba livia) created through generations of selective breeding. It is considered to now be extinct. The Parisian pouter is described throughout historic accounts as having a long crop, being short in stature with proportionately short legs, a wide or "thick" body, and a general stockiness. These traits differed significantly from modern and even historic phenotypical characteristics of pouters, and were widely considered to be undesirable as a result of their estrangement from published breed standards regarding the rest of the group. The perceived inferiority of the breed likely contributed to its extinction, as it was discouraged to breed it with breeds that were considered to be morphologically superior. American fancier John Matthew Eaton considered the traits of the Parisian pouter to be far less desirable than that of the English pouter, which he noted as being "infinitely superior for elegance and style" in his 1858 breed guide; A treatise on the art of breeding and managing tame, domesticated, foreign, and fancy pigeons.

== Morphology ==
The Parisian pouter is unanimously described across historic breed standards as being a small, thick, short-bodied, short-legged breed possessing a long crop. Some sources describe it as being "relatively large" or low-set, though these descriptors likely relate more to its heft and girth rather than height.

The breed was wholly unique among pouters for its striking chequered plumage, noted across historic accounts as being similar in appearance to that of "Irish stitch". The chequered appearance was once regarded to have encompassed the whole body of the Parisian pouter, however, fancier James C. Lyell, author of the 1881 breed guide Fancy Pigeons corrects this description and clarifies that the chequering was likely exclusive to the wing shields (coverts) and occasionally the tail. He notes that the similarities in pattern may signify that the Parisian pouter is genetically similar to hyacinth pigeons and their consanguineous varieties. The Irish stitch has been compared to the patterns of the Cauchois pigeon, and fancier Dr. Hans Schingen of the French pouter specialty club notes this patterning to be a direct result of crossbreeding between the two breeds. The chequering was said to be more valuable to breeders proportionately to the amount of red colouration within the feathers, suggesting that an idyllic Parisian pouter likely sported entirely red chequered plumage. Mottled spread patterning as described in the Parisian pouter is present within modern breeds, though it is more commonly referred to by contemporary authors such as American fancier Wendell M. Levi as "tigering" or "grizzling" rather than "chequering".

The breed also possessed characteristically white flights, though Lyell notes they and the tail feathers could also exhibit spangling in a similar manner to the chequered patterns of the body.

Modern pouter breeds such as the Dutch cropper or English pouter are bred chiefly for their tall stature, lightweight, long, thin legs, erect posture, and their disproportionately inflated crop. Levi addresses the English varieties of pouter as possessing a "stately appearance" and "royal presence" close to being "perfect". The Parisian pouter, with its generally distinct and unique traits among pouters, was seemingly highly unpopular with breeders and fanciers.

== History and extinction ==
Pouters and croppers are mentioned as a breed group as early as 1678 in ornithologist Francis Willughby's compendium; Ornithology.

The first instance of the Parisian pouter's differentiation and identification comes from fancier John Moore's 1735 breed standard; Columbarium, where he offers the first notable description of the breed. His description was quickly parroted to a near identical extent by his successors, Lyell, Eaton, and William Bernhard Tegetmeier. Moore also initially noted that the breed was bred in Paris, after which it was circulated in Brussels, before arriving in Britain sometime after. He neglects to include specific years of its inception or emigration from France.

Historic descriptions of the Parisian pouter
Author & date published	Breed standard/guide	Description
John Moore (1735)	Columbarium	"This pigeon was originally bred at Paris, and from thence brought to Brussels, whence it was transmitted to us. It has all the nature of a Pouter, but is generally long-cropped, and not very large; it is short-bodied, short-legged, and thick in the girt. What is chiefly admired in this bird is its feather, which is indeed very beautiful, and peculiar only to itself, resembling a fine piece of Irish stitch, being checkered with various colors in every feather, except the flight which is white; the more red it has mixed with the other colors, the more valuable it is. Some are gravel-eyed, and some bull-eyed, but it is equally indifferent which eye it has."
John M. Eaton (1858)	A treatise on the art of breeding and managing tame, domesticated, foreign, and fancy pigeons	"-This Pigeon was originally bred at Paris (*) and from thence brought to Brussels, whence it was transmitted to us ; it has all the nature of a Powter, but is generally long cropped and not very large, it is short bodied, short legged, and thick in the girt ; what is chiefly admired in this bird, is its feather, which is indeed very beautiful, and peculiar only to itself, resembling a fine piece of Irish stitch, being chequered with various colours in every feather, except the flight which is white; the more red it has mixed with the other colours, the more valuable it is: Some are gravel-eyed, and some bull-eyed, but it is equally indifferent which eye it has."
William B. Tegetmeier (1868)	Pigeons: their structure, varieties, habits, and management	"This pigeon was originally bred at Paris, and from thence brought to Binissels, whence it was transmitted to us ; it has all the nature of a Pouter, but is generally long-cropped and not very large ; it is short-bodied, short-legged, and thick in the girt. What is chiefly admired in this bird is its feather, which is indeed very beautiful, and peculiar only to itself, resembling a fine piece of Irish stitch, being chequered with various colours in every feather, except the flight, which is white ; the more red it has mixed with the other colours, the more valuable it is : some are gravel-eyed, and some bull-eyed, but it is equally indifferent which eye it has."
James C. Lyell (1881)	Fancy pigeons	"This pigeon was originally bred at Paris and from thence brought to Brussels, whence it was transmitted to us ; it has all the Nature of a Powter, but is generally long crop'd and not very large, it is short bodied, short leg'd, and thick in the girt ; what is chiefly admir'd in this Bird is its Feather, which is indeed very beautiful and peculiar only to it self, resembling a fine piece of Irish stitch, being chequer'd with various Colours in every Feather, except the flight which is white ; the more red it has intermix'd with the other Colours the more valuable it is. Some are Gravel ey'd, and some bull ey'd, but it is equally indifferent which eye it has." If for " every feather" we read the wing coverts-which are the only feathers, except the flights and tail, that can possibly be spangled in pigeons in the above way— Moore's description of the Parisian Pouter, the Parazence Pouter of the treatise of 1765, agrees with that of the sub-varieties of the Pigeon Maillé Jacinthe, or Hyacinth."

Dr. Schingen notes that the Parisian pouter did not undergo much phenotypical or morphological alteration if any in the hundred years proceeding Moore's initial description of the breed. This would suggest the breed becoming reproductively isolated due to not being bred with more pure-bred pouters such as the Dutch cropper, however, Tegetmeier contradicts this claim by noting that the English pouter was likely crossbred with the Parisian pouter, alongside the uploper and pouting horseman. The Parisian pouter is considered by Schingen to be the sole member of a "side group" in pouter lineage rather than the direct ancestor to modern breeds such as the French or English pouter, the former of which he rules out entirely as being a direct descendant of the Parisian simply due to its chequered colouration, which the French pouter lacks entirely. Tegetmeier proposes that modern pouters may have been created through crossbreeding Parisian pouters with more idyllic longer-limbed birds.

Dr. Schingen notes that "the trail of the Parisian pouter disappears around 1850.", a vague claim that likely refers to a loss of phenotypic definition rather than a total extinction yet. The breed likely became lost around the late 19th century as a result of dilution from crossbreeding with other more viable pouters.

== See also ==
- Pouter
- List of fancy pigeon breeds
