= Hyacinth pigeon =

Breed of pigeon

Hyacinth Pigeon
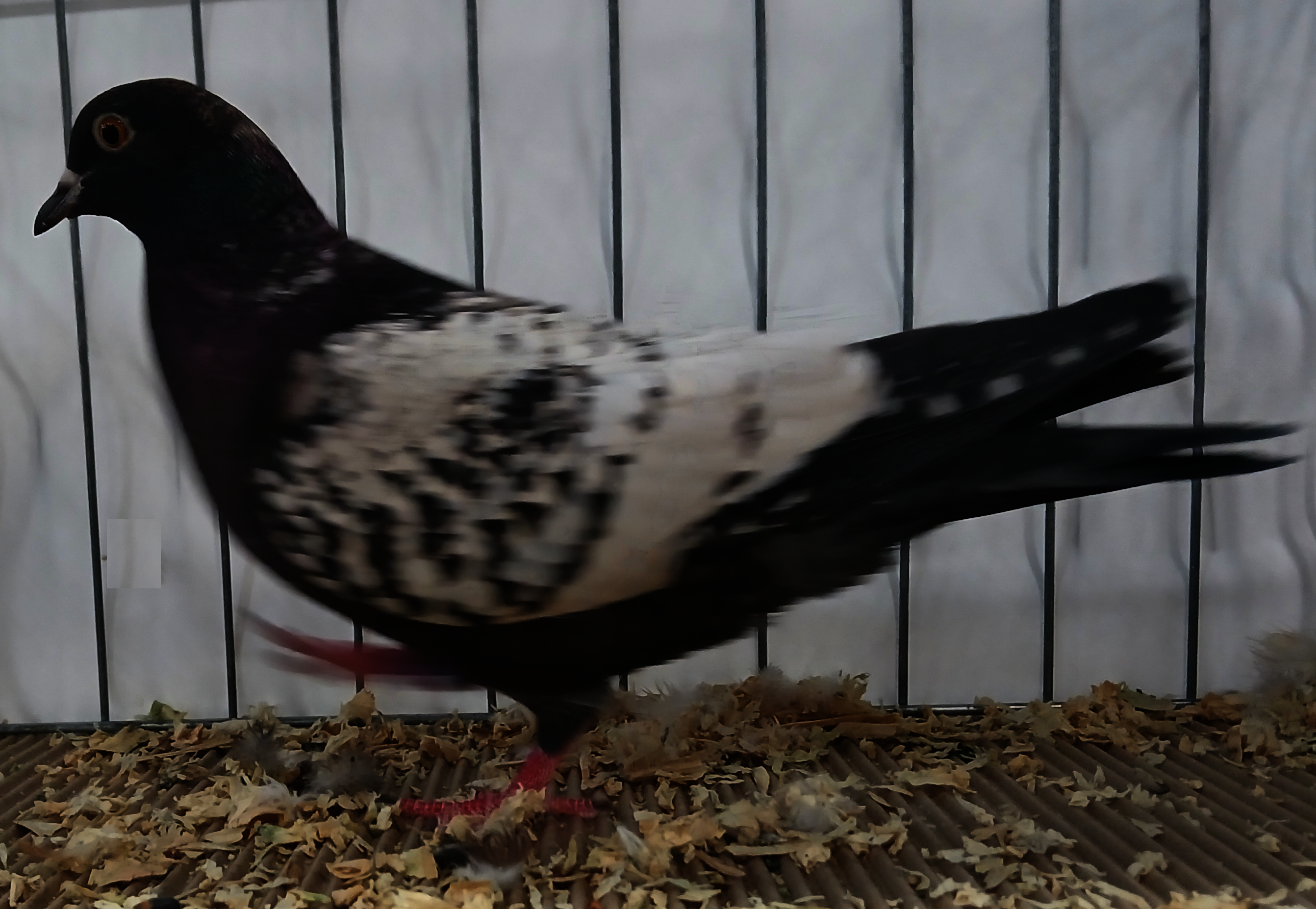
- A standard Hyacinth pigeon.
- Conservation status: Not Evaluated
- Other names: Speckled Hyacinth pigeon, Victoria pigeon, Porcelain pigeon
- Country of origin: Unknown, likely France

Traits
- Crest type: Plain-headed
- Feather ornamentation: Speckled and laced

Classification
- US Breed Group: Color
- EE Breed Group: Colour Pigeons

The Hyacinth pigeon also referred to as the speckled hyacinth, is a breed of fancy pigeon originating most likely from France. It is recognised as a member of the Colour Pigeons breed group (EE0400 or individually as NL/0408) by the European Standard Committee for Pigeons. It is recognised under the Color breed group by the US National Pigeon Association. Hyacinths are defined by a deep blue-black plumage that encompasses the entirety of their head, neck, breast, undercarriage, and tail feathers, while the wing shield and secondaries are a stark white or ivory. The primaries are marked by small white specks, and the shields are ledged and speckled with interlacing black feathers. The deep blue-black of the body is iridescent and is a far deeper shade than any Andalusian pigeon. The beak is proportional to the head and dark, while the cere is white and small. Hyacinths are clean-legged with no cuffs. The Hyacinth is an important agricultural breed in the Netherlands, listed on the UN Food and Agriculture Organisation (FAO) World Watch List for Domestic Animal Diversity.

== History ==
As with all fancy pigeon breeds, the Hyacinth is descended from the rock dove, domesticated around 5,000 years ago in the Middle East and Mediterranean and one of earth's most phenotypically diverse bird species. The Hyacinth belongs to the colour pigeons breed group, a breed group of pigeons which are bred for their impressive or striking plumage. This breed group is phylogenetically most similar to structure pigeons, a breed group of pigeons bred for distinctive structural features such as body shape, crests, cuffs, or general feather structure.

=== Confusion surrounding origin ===
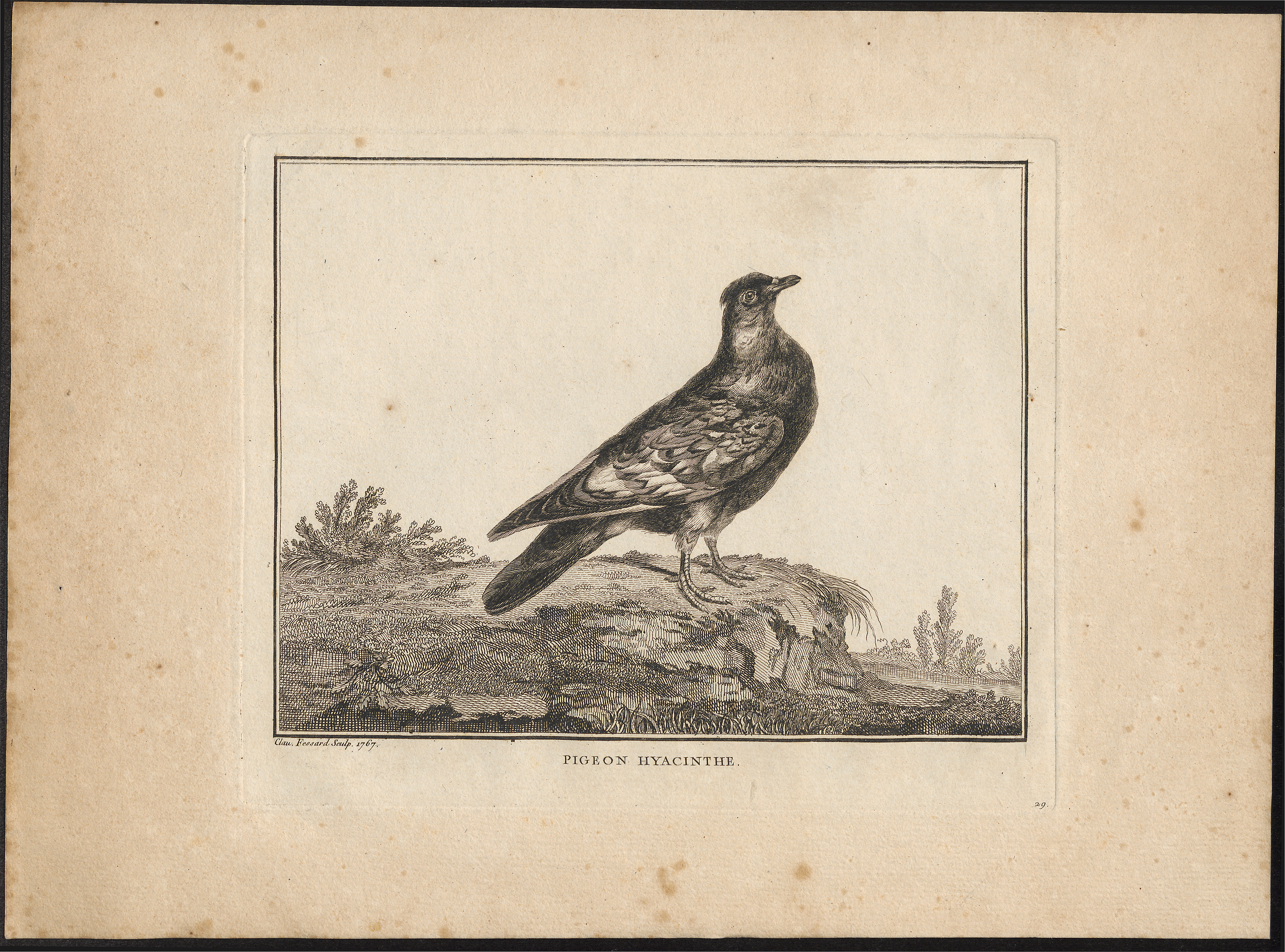
A 1767 portrait of the Hyacinth pigeon by C. F. Sculpt, collected by the University of Amsterdam.

Wendell M. Levi, experienced American pigeon breeder and author of The Pigeon, notes that the exact origin of the Hyacinth as a breed is unknown. Prior to Levi's assessment, the Hyacinth was included in Dutch breeder C.A.M. Spruijt's 1927 book, Toy pigeons and other continental races : a full description of all breeds with detailed standards, where he included it in his chapter on German toys, noting that he was similarly unsure of its origin. Spruijt states that he believes it to be closely related to the starling pigeons, due to morphological similarities between the Hyacinth and German laced starling, as well as morphologically standard Hyacinth squabs being born as a result of crossbreeding them with starlings. The Hyacinth has also previously been incorrectly classed as a breed of Swiss (Lucerne) pigeon. Interestingly, English breeder, James C. Lyell states in his 1887 work, Fancy Pigeons, that the Hyacinth is a French breed that is genetically very similar to the pouters, positing that the Parisian pouter and porcelain pigeon are sub-varieties of the Hyacinth. Lyell classes the Hyacinth under the category of French Maillé, a contemporary French breed group of mailed, armoured, or speckled pigeons, with the term Maillé referring to plumage. Levi believes Lyell's assignment of the pigeon as originating in France as a "good historical conception" in regards to the context of the pigeon's origins as a breed. English breeder, Robert Fulton notes in his 1876 book The illustrated book of pigeons, with standards for judging that the Hyacinth is of German origin. Levi disregards this statement as a likely mistake. Overall, the origin of the breed is unknown, but Lyell's recounting is likely the most reliable in a historical context according to Levi.

=== Consanguineous breeds ===
The Victoria is a similarly sized pigeon breed, nearly identical in appearance aside from a marginally larger frame when compared to the Hyacinth. The Victoria may also appear slightly different in plumage, being a lighter shade across the body, and having an off-white or pale sulphur yellow in place of the Hyacinth's stark or cream white. The Hyacinth and Victoria were regarded as the same breed by German breeder, Gustav Prütz. Similarly, Fulton found the breeds nearly indistinguishable from one another. The porcelain is another incredibly similar breed to the Hyacinth, the chief difference being its darker overall plumage and slightly lighter more consistent whites. Most sources on fancy pigeons class the Hyacinth, the Victoria, and the porcelain as consanguineous breeds.

== Morphological Standard ==
In order to be considered show worthy, the Hyacinth must comply to a morphological standard. Common points of anatomical scrutiny are the beak, build, and plumage.

Hyacinths should be large, bold, strong, and hardy in build, and an ideal pigeon should carry itself more erect and commanding than other fancy pigeon varieties. They can sometimes rival middle-sized runts in size. The neck is slender and erect, the legs should be long. The Hyacinth lacks a crest, the head should be plain and smooth in conjunction to the breast, which is also absent from any ornate feather structures (i.e. the jabot in owl and frill breeds), the legs should be clean without pronounced feathering or cuffs. The beak is straighter and stronger than some other varieties and the eyes should be a bold orange.

=== Hyacinth Plumage and Variations ===
The Hyacinth exhibits a striking blue-black or blue-purple iridescent plumage on the head, neck, breast, undercarriage, tail, thighs, vent, and rump, in a similar manner to some varieties of starling pigeon. The primaries should be a similar dark colour with a small white mark or speck at the ends. There should be a black terminal bar towards the end of the tail feathers. The saddle or wing shields are an ivory or cream white with a delicate edging and lacing of spangled or speckled black.

Lyell records additional varieties of Hyacinth under the term Pigeon Maillé Jacinthe, stating that the variety has ten white primaries rather than the modern black. The passage likely describes a variation of the standard Hyacinth, which Lyell denotes as the "white-flighted" Hyacinth. He notes four additional variants, Pigeon Maillé Jacinthe Plein, Pigeon Maillé Jacinthe Coleur de Feu, Pigeon Maillé Jacinthe Noyer, and Pigeon Maillé Jacinthe Pécher. The first is identical to the white-flighted Hyacinth aside from a smaller stature and dark flights, the second possesses a red colouration in place of the characteristic white, the third possesses a deep walnut (dun) colouration with yellow in place of the whites, and the fourth possesses peach colouration in place of the whites. Lyell states that the Noyer is the cross of the de Feu and the white-flighted Hyacinth, and the Pécher is similarly a cross of the Noyer and white-flighted Hyacinth.

== Behaviour ==
The behaviour of the Hyacinth is not well-documented, with the majority of sources focusing more on the morphology of the breed and its striking plumage. Fulton notes that the Hyacinth is wild and uneasy in nature, suggesting a less trusting temperament, though this could be dependent on the individual. Hyacinths can inflate their crop to a degree, likely as a manner of display when vocalising, an incredibly common natural behaviour amongst fancy pigeons that is also present in rock doves. Lyell notes that while the Hyacinth can and does inflate its crop, the crop does not swell to the same extent as a pouter.

== Gallery ==
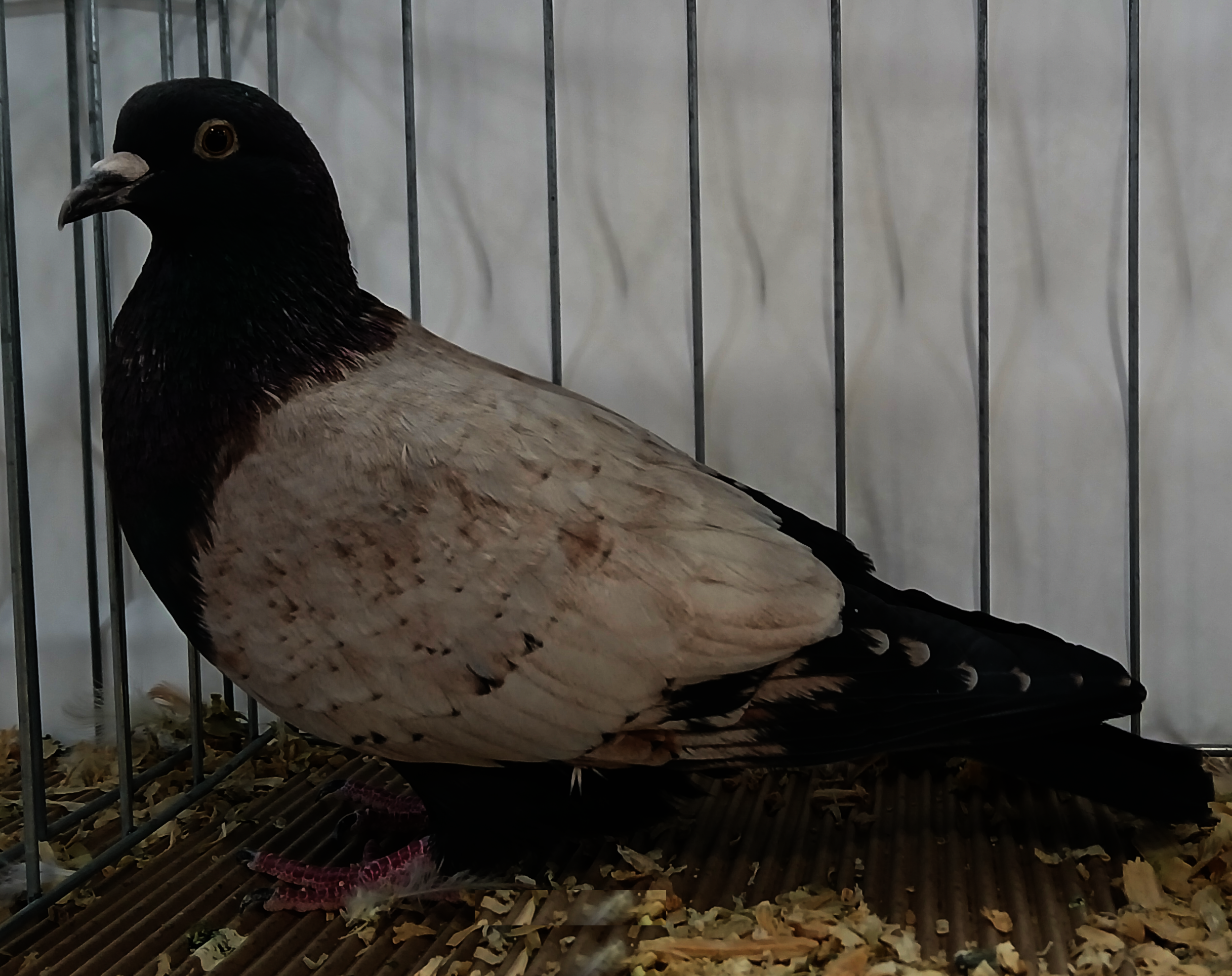

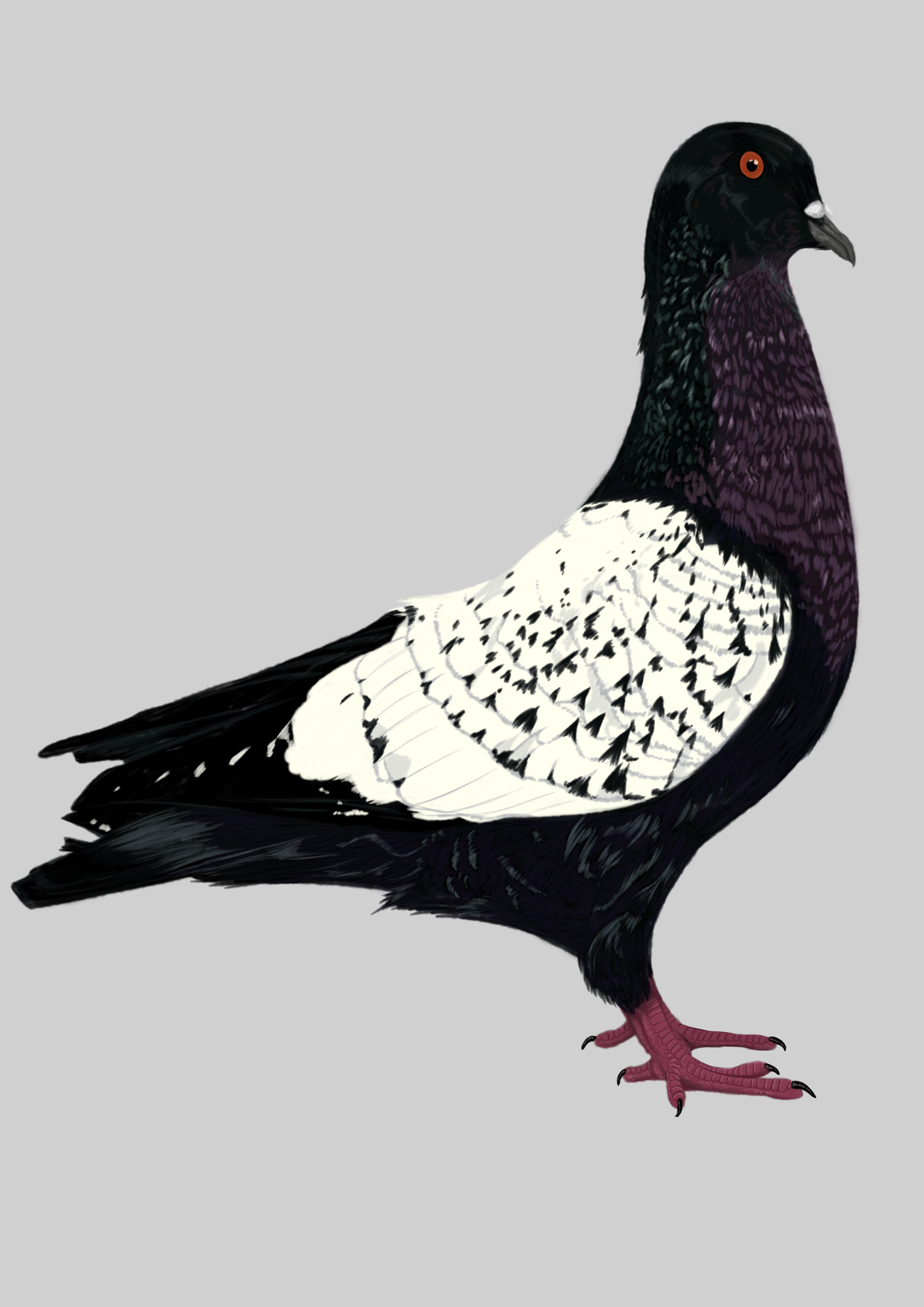

== See also ==
- Pigeon Diet
- Pigeon Housing
- List of Pigeon Breeds
- EE List of Fancy Pigeon Breeds
- US List of Fancy Pigeon Breeds
