= American Giant Rumbler =

Breed of pigeon

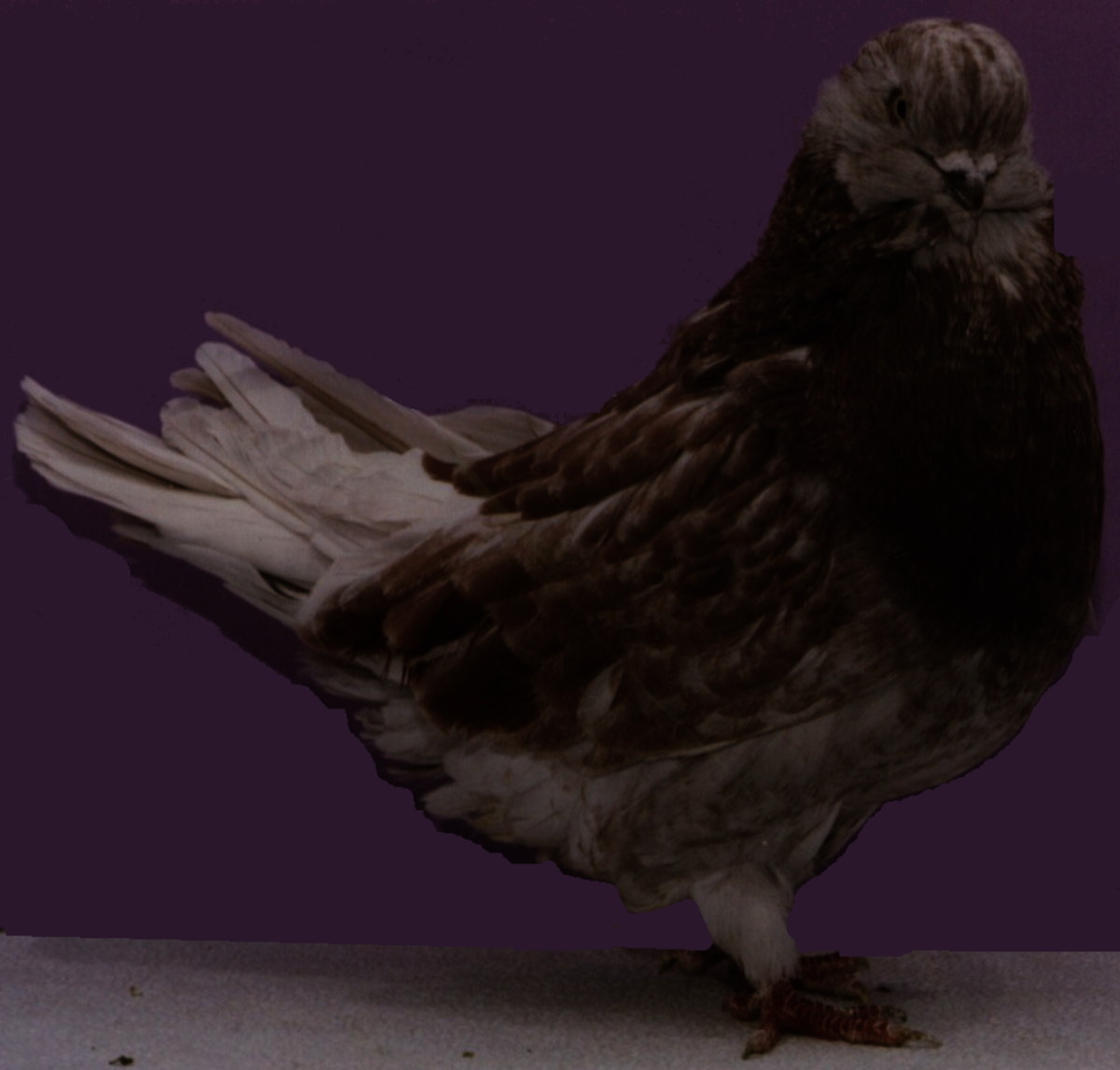
- Red Check
- Conservation status: Rare
- Other names: Giant Rumbler
- Nicknames: Rumbler
- Country of origin: United States

Classification
- Australian Breed Group: Utility Pigeons Group 8
- US Breed Group: Form
- EE Breed Group: None

The American Giant Rumbler is a breed of pigeon developed by crossing the English Long-faced Tumbler and the Giant Runt. It was created by H. Eric Buri, and Wesley Conover, of the United States, in the early 1950s and 60s.

== Description ==
This breed of pigeon was developed in the United States with selective breeding drawing from the English Long-faced Tumbler and the Giant Runt. It is primarily considered a Utility or Form breed. The Rumbler along with other varieties of domesticated pigeons are all descendants from the rock dove (Columba livia).

=== Characteristics ===
This is a two handed bird! It is very broad at the shoulders, wide throughout, and tapering toward the tail. The head is large, even massive, fitting the body. The head is oval shaped rather than round. The wings are up off the floor, held close to the body and do not protrude over the chest, appearing as a single line from neck to tail. Both the tail and wing feathers are held up, not dragging on the ground. The legs are short and thick, just as needed to hold up the two handed body. While large, the breed is gentle, even docile. They use the largest size bands made by the National Pigeon Association.

==== Colors ====
Red, Yellow, Black, Dun, Blue, Silver, ash Reds, Ash Yellows (Creams), Rares, Whites, and AOC.

=== Status ===
Rare

== History ==
The American Giant Rumbler was created by H. Eric Buri, and Wesley Conover, of the United States, in the early 1950s and 60s. It was developed by crossing the English Long-faced Tumbler and the Giant Runt, The object being to develop a pigeon as large as the Runt, but with a larger more powerful head, and the short beak of the Tumbler. The Rumbler's odd name came from the breeds used in its creation, combining the names of Runt and Tumbler. It took 2 ½ years for the American Giant Rumbler Club to complete the original Standard of Perfection. Diane Jacky did a superb job on the ideal drawing of the Male and Female Rumblers, and the adopted text was written by the membership of the American Giant Rumbler Club and the Canadian Giant Rumbler Club. Although the standard stipulates that the Rumbler is a very large pigeon, other characteristics are more important than size. Some of the breeders who helped develop the standard include Mark E. Ferguson, Harris E. Ferguson, Jose Salema, Manual Sousa, Charles and Marie Clegg, Charles A. Neuman, Scott Hamilton, John Medeiros, Tony Cabral and Wesley L. Conover.

== See also ==
- List of pigeon breeds
- Pigeon keeping
  - Pigeon Diet
  - Pigeon Housing

== External Gallery ==
Light red Rumbler on Pigeoncote.com
