= English Pouter =

Breed of pigeon

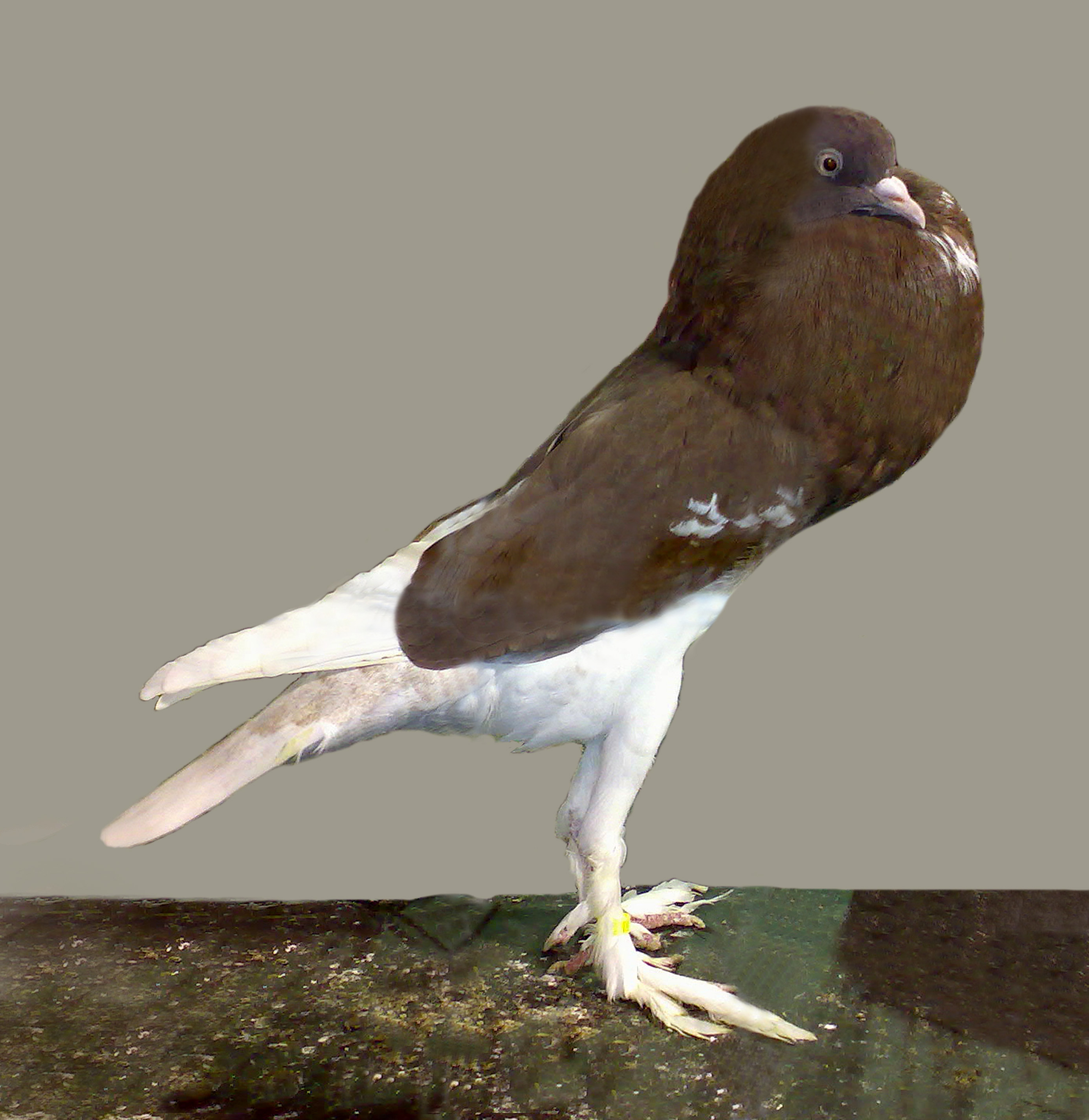
- Brown English Pouter
- Conservation status: Common
- Country of origin: England

Classification
- US Breed Group: Fancy
- EE Breed Group: Pouter and Cropper

The English Pouter is a breed of fancy pigeon developed over many years of selective breeding. English Pouters, along with other varieties of domesticated pigeons, are all descendants from the rock pigeon. A breed with an enlarged crop, their distinctiveness was described by Charles Darwin in The Variation of Animals and Plants Under Domestication (1868).

== History ==
William Bernhardt Tegetmeier proposed that the English Pouter originated from cross breeding the old pigeon breeds the Dutch Cropper, Uploper and the Parisian pouter. Each of these breeds is described in works dating from the 17th century. However, in an earlier account, John Moore suggested that the breed was the result of cross breeding between a type of cropper and horseman (both 18th century pigeon types). Historically, the English Pouter was also called the Pouting Horseman, due to the links with the Horseman breed. The modern breeds of croppers, such as the Norwich Cropper, originate from the English Pouter.

Charles Darwin described the English Pouter in his 1868 work The Variation of Animals and Plants Under Domestication, saying that the breed was "perhaps the most distinct of all domesticated pigeons".

== Description ==
As with all breeds of domesticated pigeons, the English Pouter is descended from the rock pigeon (Columba livia), and has been developed over years through selective breeding of individuals with specific characteristics. It is a breed of fancy pigeon, that being a type of pigeon kept by pigeon fanciers as part of the fancy pigeon group as opposed to Flying/Sporting Pigeons or Utility pigeons. The Pouter is long limbed with an enlarged crop, and overall a large body.

== See also ==
- Pigeon keeping
  - Pigeon Diet
  - Pigeon Housing
- List of pigeon breeds
