= Starling pigeon =

Breed of pigeon

Starling
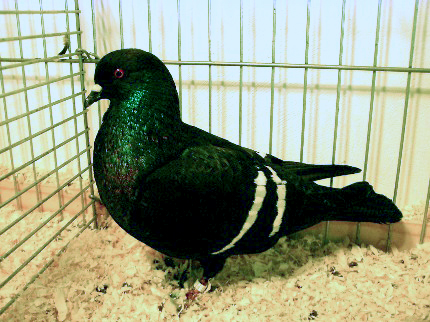
- A barred starling.
- Conservation status: Not Evaluated
- Other names: Startaube, Black Swiss
- Country of origin: Germany

Traits
- Crest type: Often plain-headed, though dependent on variety
- Feather ornamentation: Dark, lustrous and iridescent

Classification
- US Breed Group: Color
- EE Breed Group: Colour Pigeons

The Starling, Startaube, or Black Swiss, is a breed of fancy pigeon created through generations of selective breeding and originating in Germany. The breed encompasses multiple varieties, differentiated mainly by plumage. It belongs to the Colour Pigeons breed group (EE0400 or individually as NL/0405) by the European Standard Committee for Pigeons. it is recognised under the Color breed group by the US National Pigeon Association. The starling is characterised by a dark, black, body-spanning plumage defined by prominent beetle green iridescence. The best known variety of starling is the barred starling (pictured), which possesses the characteristic lustrous plumage of the breed with the addition of two defining white bars along the wing coverts. The body is loosely flecked with wash out reds and golds. It also possesses a more pale-feathered crescent mark on the neck's front, which is sometimes white or grey but it is more commonly likened to the colour of a starling (Sturnus vulgaris) the resemblance for which the breed is named. The German name of the breed, Staarenhals makes this comparison even more obvious, translating literally to "starling neck". The beak is proportional to the head, strong and dark with a white cere. The eyes are a deep orange-red and the legs are a coral pink and typically clean without extensively feathered cuffs.

== History ==
As with all other fancy pigeon breeds, the starling is a descendent of the rock dove (Columba livia), first domesticated in the Middle East and Mediterranean at least 5,000 years ago, and one of earth's most phenotypically diverse bird species. Phylogenetically, the colour breed group that the starling belongs to is most similar to the structure pigeons, bred for their impressive structural morphology (eg. crests, builds, feathers, etc.) The starling is one of the most genetically diverse fancy pigeon breeds, evidenced in its large number of variations which is only rivaled by the Archangel, a similarly incredibly genetically diverse breed. It is presumed that this genetic diversity is the result of different lineages within the respective breeds, implying that the observed high level of genetic diversity might be an artefact due to the presence of some level of genetic structure within these breeds.

The barred starling originates from southern Germany as well as the German regions of Thuringia. A German breed standard from 1954 translated by American breeder H.P. Macklin details that the starling has been bred in Thuringia since the 1600s. While varieties with crests have become more popular in the present, original Thuringian fanciers preferred plain or smooth-headed starlings, often favouring blue over the now much more popular black. On the contrary, fanciers from Swabia, a region in southern Germany, far preferred black starlings with peaked or shell crests. Despite this, smooth-headed starlings as a whole have become more common in south Germany in the modern day, while blues remain prevalent in Thuringia. A variation of starling defined by its black laced wing coverts and exclusively black, grey and white colouration is the marble starling, which was first developed in Württemberg. Some variations of the starling, namely the silver-laced starling, are frequently included as a variant of the Suabian, a similarly plumed German breed and a close relative of the starling.

== Morphological Standards ==
The starling should be most akin in body shape to the common field dove (Columba familiaris), regardless of its variation in plumage, presence of crest, or presence of feathering on the legs. The neck should be long and full, carried forward from the shoulders, which are broad and taper down the back with the wings. The tail feathers should be packed tightly together and marginally longer than the furthest point of the primaries when the wings are folded.

=== Starling varieties and standardised plumage ===
==== White-headed, monk-headed, and white-tailed starlings ====
Across all the phenotypes of starlings, white-headed, monk-headed, and white-tailed plumage variations are present regardless of outside variation. White-headed starlings (also referred to as blasse starlings) have a characteristic white head which is demarcated by white plumage which begins at the base of the upper mandible and wraps around the upper back portion of the head beneath a shell crest. It most closely resembles that of the mookee. The monk-headed starlings have an entirely white head with a slight ruff around its base. The demarcation here instead starts at the undercut of the throat and lower mandible, running 3/4 of a centimetre (7.5mm or 0.29in) under the eye to the back of the head. The border of the head should not be too high or low cut. Monk-headed starlings should also have 7-9 white flight feathers, a white tail. White feathering at the heel joint is not discouraged. Lastly in white-tailed starlings, all twelve tail feathers should be white with the underside tail wedge being the body colour of the bird. White-tails also possess a pea-sized white mark between their eyes that meets with the cere.

==== Barred starling ====
The term "starling" is most often applied to the barred starling, defined by its deep iridescent plumage, white-barred coverts, bare legs, plain uncrested head, and crescent shaped neck marking defined by either white tipped feathers, or a starling-esque light smattering of red and gold flecks. The white bars and white crescent this variety possesses should be unobstructed by jagged lines and should remain a consistent thickness throughout their length. The crescent should be 3 cm (1.2 in) wide and clearly defined against the rest of the plumage if white or grey. While the breed can have streaks and flecks of brown across its body, these marks should not be present on the primaries or tail. The body plumage should have an appreciable lustre, which is most commonly a metallic green shade, but can also be a pink or purple. Common points of scrutiny for the plumage of the barred starling are the wing bars, the crescent, and the head and legs, the latter of which should be devoid of feathering. It is permitted for barred starlings to exhibit a shelled-crest.

Barred starlings exist in a variety of colours, including blue, red, and yellow, though black is the most esteemed by breeders and remains the most popular. If the colouration of a given red or blue starling is too light or dark, the bird is not typically considered desireable. Blue barred starlings sport the plumage of the ancestral rock dove, with blue-grey bodies, black primaries, and pale grey wing coverts with the addition of the barred starling's plumage characteristics. They are subject to the same standards as black individuals, where the white markings of the neck crescent and wing bars are expected to be obvious and untarnished by jagged edges or mottled feathering. The wing bars on a blue barred starling should also be edged with thinner black. The red and yellow barred starlings sport entirely ruddy red or gold plumage respectively, the only white parts of their plumage being the characteristic crescent and bars which are subject to the same regulation as the blues and blacks.

==== Marble starling ====
Originally bred in Württemberg, the marble starling (also referred to as the marmor startauben or marmostar in German) appears far different in plumage to the barred starling, being bred exclusively in black and possessing delicately interlacing white feathers across its black wing shields which become thicker and more chaotic down the coverts, ceasing at the primaries and giving way to solid black interrupted only by pearl coloured tips on each flight. The lacing in the wing shield is produced by the white edges of the feathers within the plumage, creating interlocking triangles. It is likely this lacing pattern which caused breeder Robert Fulton to claim the starling to be "closely allied" to porcelain pigeons (Hyacinths) in his 1876 book; The illustrated book of pigeons, with standards for judging, as the marbled starling and Hyacinth are superficially reminiscent of one another in their laced patterning. It possesses also a white crescent which is far more chequered in appearance than that of the barred starling and its colours. The crescent should be higher up the neck and narrower. Though the marble starling lacks the same colour variants as the barred, monk-headed, blasse, and white-tailed plumage variations do exist. All marble starling variations are clean legged.

==== Silver-laced starling ====
Also said to have originated in Württemberg, the silver-laced starling possesses a similar deep black body colouration to the black starling, but is differentiated by a prominent lacing of white and silver feathers down the throat and neck, stark white wingshields flecked with black in an identical manner to the hyacinth pigeon. The flights are marked with round white specks but are otherwise black. Unlike a typical starling, the crescent on the neck is more defined and can reach of an additional width of 15mm (0.6 in). osme common faults seen among the plumage of silver-laced starlings are ruddy or rusty colouration in the wing shields, reedy colouration in the flights, a grizzled colouraiton to the head plumage, or irregularly sized/absent flight spots. The silver-laced starling appears incredibly close in appearance to the Suabian. American breeder Wendell M. Levi states that the silver-laced starling is more commonly attributed as a variation of Suabian than starling in the modern day, himself even referring to it as the "Suabian spangled pigeon" in his 1941 book on pigeon breeds, The Pigeon. Silver-laced starlings also produce monk-headed, blasse, and white-tailed variations, are clean-legged, and lack any crest.

== Behaviour and Breeding ==
In breeding starlings, adult pigeons who closely match one another in plumage should be bred judiciously to facilitate desired standards among any offspring. Despite this, variegated variations such as the marbled starling rarely resemble their parents regardless of the latter's similarlities to one another in morphology. The plumage of a starling does not become well-defined or desireable to the standard until the squab has undergone its first or second moult, and prior to this, the plumage is defined by an undesireable washed-out colouration that lacks the starling-like speckling across the pigeon's ground colour that the breed is recognised for, among other defining characteristics such as the crescent. Young squabs tend to have a mahogany brown colouration throughout their plumage, muddying their black parts and producing an unattractive appearance to judging. In breeding starlings, the blue-chequered phenotype may occasionally appear amongst the progeny of breeding starlings however, this plain appearance is undesired and is typically used only to breed more favourable wing shields with individuals who possess a deeper bronzy or creamy hue to their shields. Excessive use of blue checks to create this effect however, may result in the muddying of the following clutch's own plumage. A similar result is achieved when the desired colours (black, brown, or creamy white) are bred carelessly when attempting to create lacing on the wing shields.

In behaviour, the starling is noted as an incredible field pigeon (fielding is a term used for when pigeons break from racing or homing to leisure in fields before returning to lofts), as it tends not to spend an excess amount of time foraging for grain and prefers to make its way back to the loft hastily. For this reason, it is often used as a guide for other tardier individuals when fielding, as it leads others back to the loft in a more timely manner. Starlings are also proficient parents that will not only feed their own young reliably throughout summer and winter (typically the famine season), but will also feed the young of other pairs if prompted. James C. Lyell, English breeder and author of the 1887 guide Fancy Pigeons states that starlings have no problem foraging grain even in winter, and successfully feed their young in most circumstances with the exception of conditions of heavy snow cover.

== Gallery ==
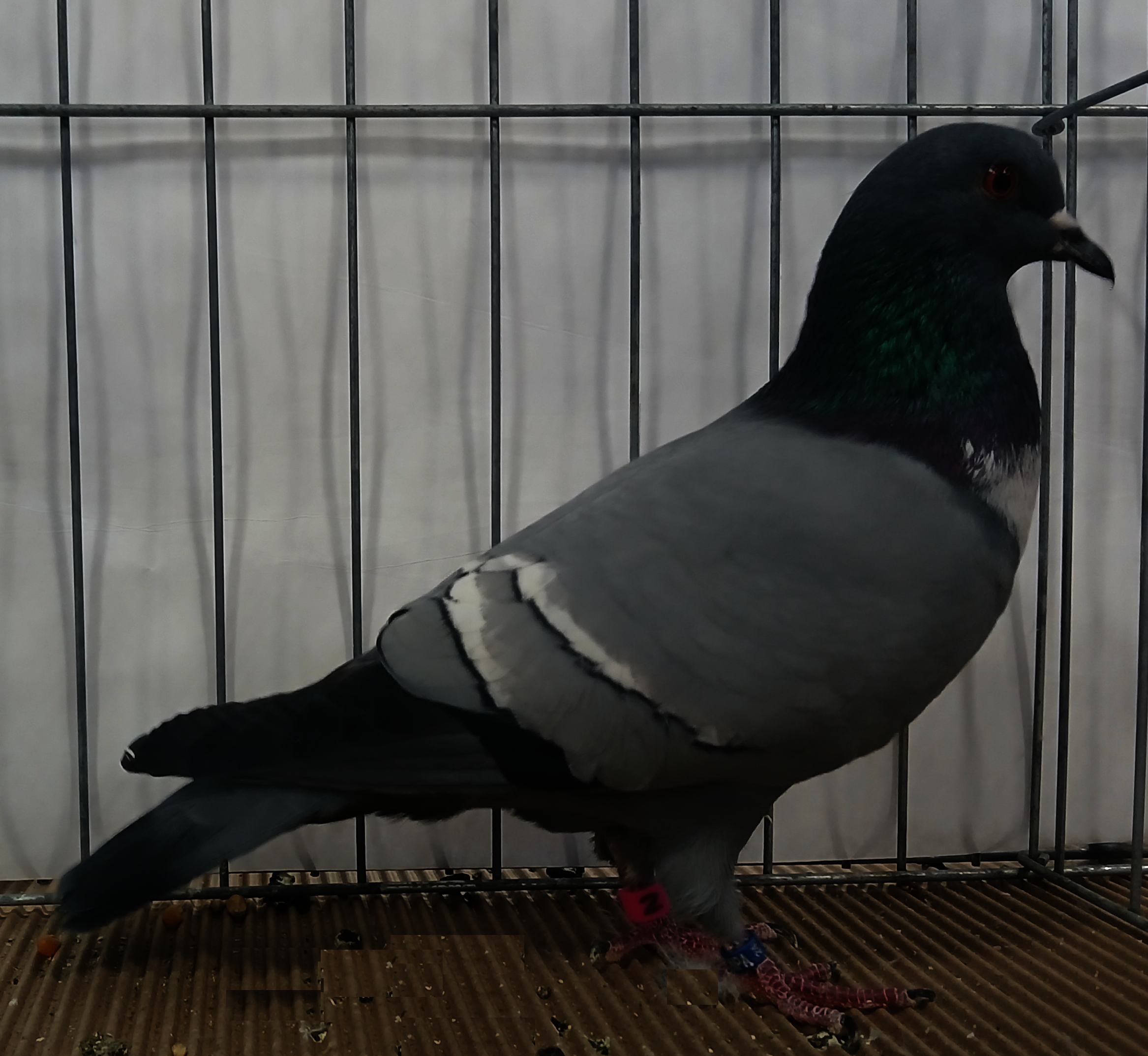

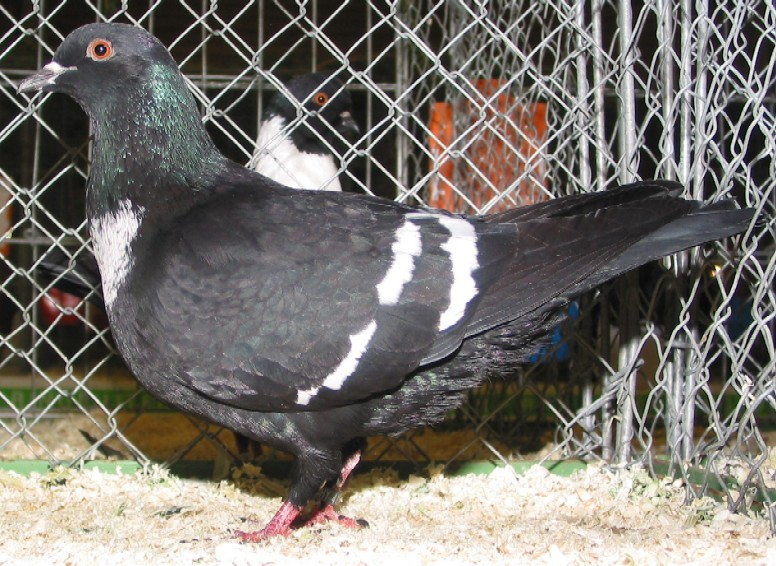

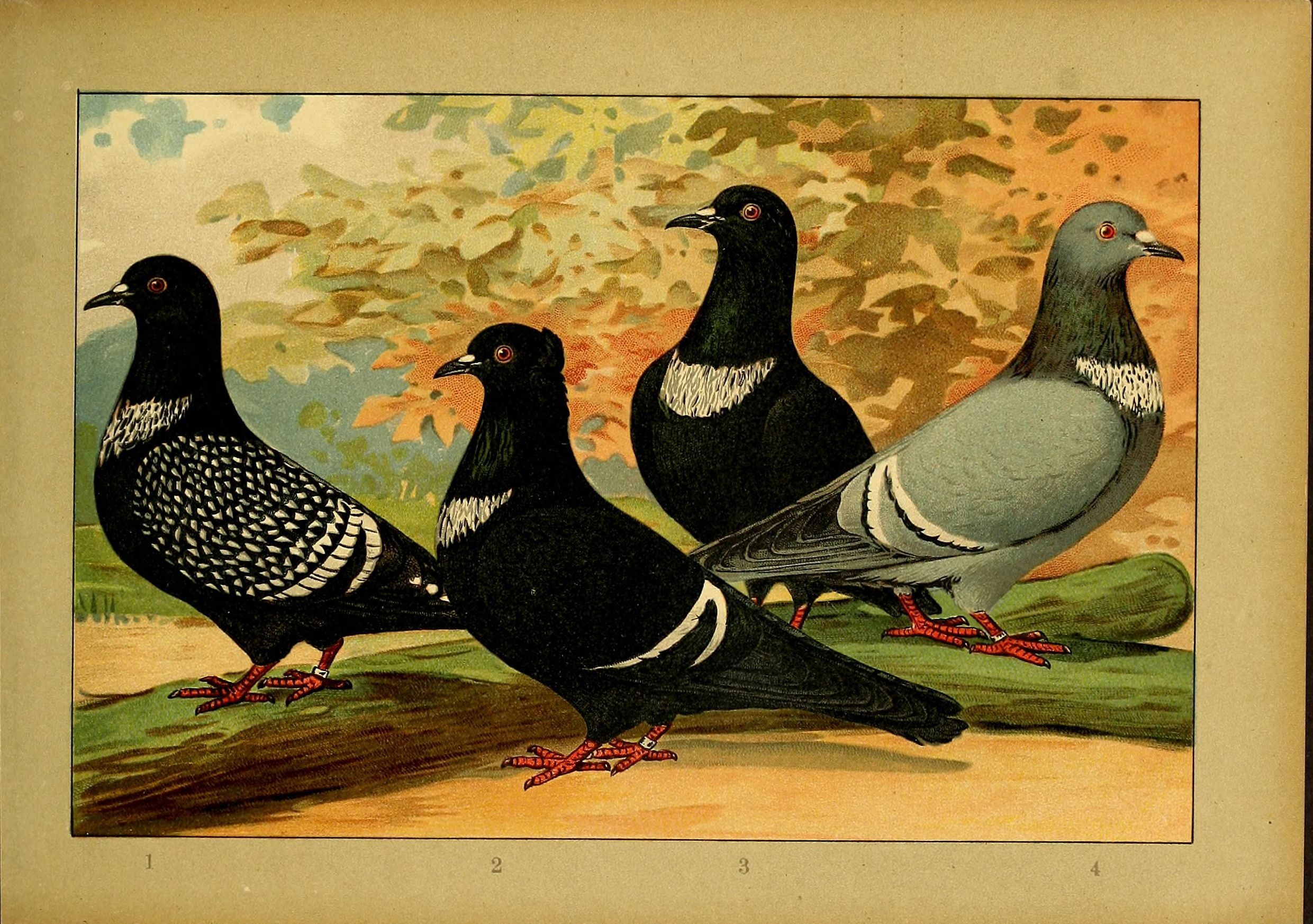
Schachtzabel 1906 Tafel 27

== See also ==
- Southern California Colour Pigeon Club - Standard for Starling Pigeons
- Pigeon Diet
- Pigeon Housing
- List of pigeon breeds
- EE List of Fancy Pigeon Breeds
- US List of Fancy Pigeon Breeds
