= Danish Suabian =

Breed of pigeon

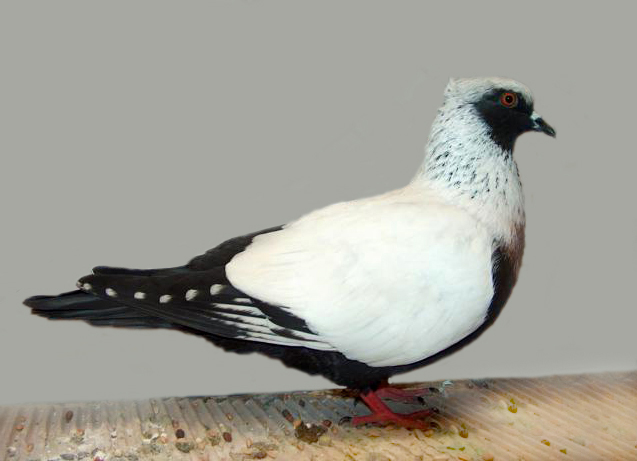
- Black Danish Suabian
- Conservation status: Common

Classification
- US Breed Group: Fancy pigeons
- EE Breed Group: Colour pigeons (DK/404)

The Danish Suabian is a breed of fancy pigeon, developed over many years of selective breeding. Danish Suabians, along with other varieties of domesticated pigeons, are all descendants from the rock pigeon (Columba livia). The breed comes in silver, blue, ash yellow, ash red, black, red, yellow, and brown barred and is either plain-head or peak crested.

== Origins ==
Suabians are thought to have been developed in France and Holland from the laced Starling and imported to Denmark around 1840.

== See also ==
- List of pigeon breeds
