= Dutch Cropper =

Breed of pigeon

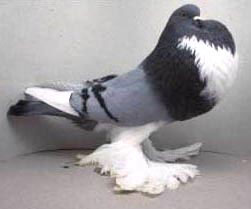
- Conservation status: Common
- Country of origin: Netherlands

Traits
- Feather ornamentation: Foot feathering

Classification
- Australian Breed Group: Group 5 Croppers
- US Breed Group: Pouters & Croppers
- EE Breed Group: Pouter Cropper NL12

Notes
- Oldest and largest National fancy pigeon breed in the Netherlands.

The Dutch Cropper is the oldest and largest National fancy pigeon breed in the Netherlands.

== History ==
As C.A.M. Spruijt points out in his 1929 book De Kropperrassen, the origin of the Dutch Cropper is not very clear. He refers to Ulysses Aldrovandi (1522–1605), who wrote in 1600 about “the great Croppers with muffs at the Batavians” (Holland and Belgium). In English literature the English Pouters came from Holland and Germany. Neumeister describes the Croppers in his first book of 1837. This book was republished in 1876, adapted by Prütz and features colour illustrations including a number of well-known German muffed Cropper breeds, which he called ‘Hollandische Kropf Tauben’.

The relationships among the various larger Cropper breeds Dutch Cropper, Ghent Cropper, Pomeranian Pouter, English Pouter, French Pouter and Saxon Pouter show a strong resemblance in main breed characteristics. The ancestors of all present Cropper/ Pouter breeds; date to at least 400 years ago in Europe. This relationship enabled the use of the related breeds when one became in danger of becoming extinct.

Immediately after the Second World War, the Dutch and Ghent Croppers were used to bring each other back to their standard. In addition, the Pomeranian and English Pouters were used. This sometimes could produce a surprise when from a good stock Dutch Cropper, a perfect Pomeranian Pouter is hatched. This happened to Jac. Beljaars, a Dutch Cropper breeder.

== Character ==
Van Gink wrote of his experiences with the Dutch Cropper. After initially having a number of other Cropper breeds, he decided one day to start with the Dutch Cropper. In particular because of its very confident nature. It is striking that the confident nature and tameness is so attached to that colour. In the article he wrote that as a boy he already had a good bond with the blue-coloured Dutch Cropper; he just had to call them and put out his hand and the birds would fly to him with loud wing clapping and land on his hand. This childhood experience always remained with him. In high school van Gink was studying in Amsterdam. He had a room near the Jordan district. All around the area were pigeon lofts. All of his friends loved pigeons. They had to smuggle their pigeon purchases into their homes, because their parents did not like the dirty pigeon mess.

== Gallery ==
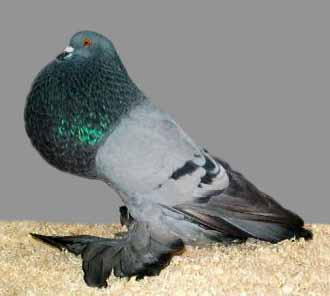
Blue bar

== See also ==
- List of pigeon breeds
- Pigeon keeping
  - Pigeon Diet
  - Pigeon Housing
