= Giant Runt =

Breed of pigeon

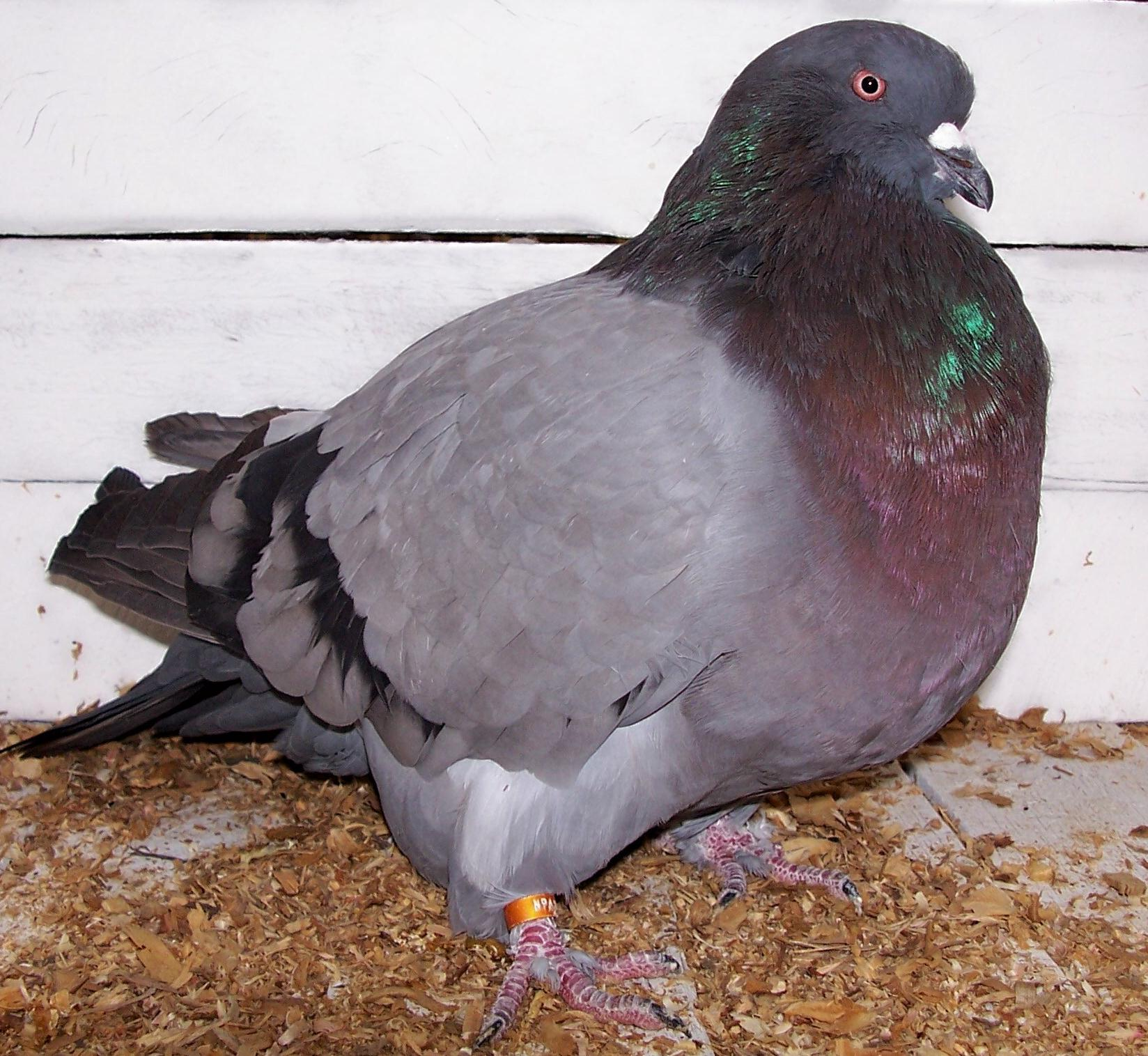
- Blue bar Giant Runt
- Conservation status: Common
- Country of origin: United States

Classification
- US Breed Group: Form

Notes
- A squabbing/show pigeon

The Giant Runt is a breed of pigeon developed by selective breeding primarily as a utility and exhibition breed. American Giant Runts, along with other varieties of the domestic pigeon, are all descendants from the rock pigeon (Columba livia). The breed is known for its large size and suitability for squab production. While not the most popular breed of pigeon, it can still be found exhibited at large shows. The American Pigeon Journal devoted a special issue for the breed.

== Origin ==
The Giant Runt was developed by crossing the original Runt with several other varieties. The American Giant Runt was the result of US breeders seeking a wider, more compact bird denoting power and body mass. A related breed is the American Giant Rumbler which is a further development. Both varieties are recognized in the United States and India.

== Gallery ==
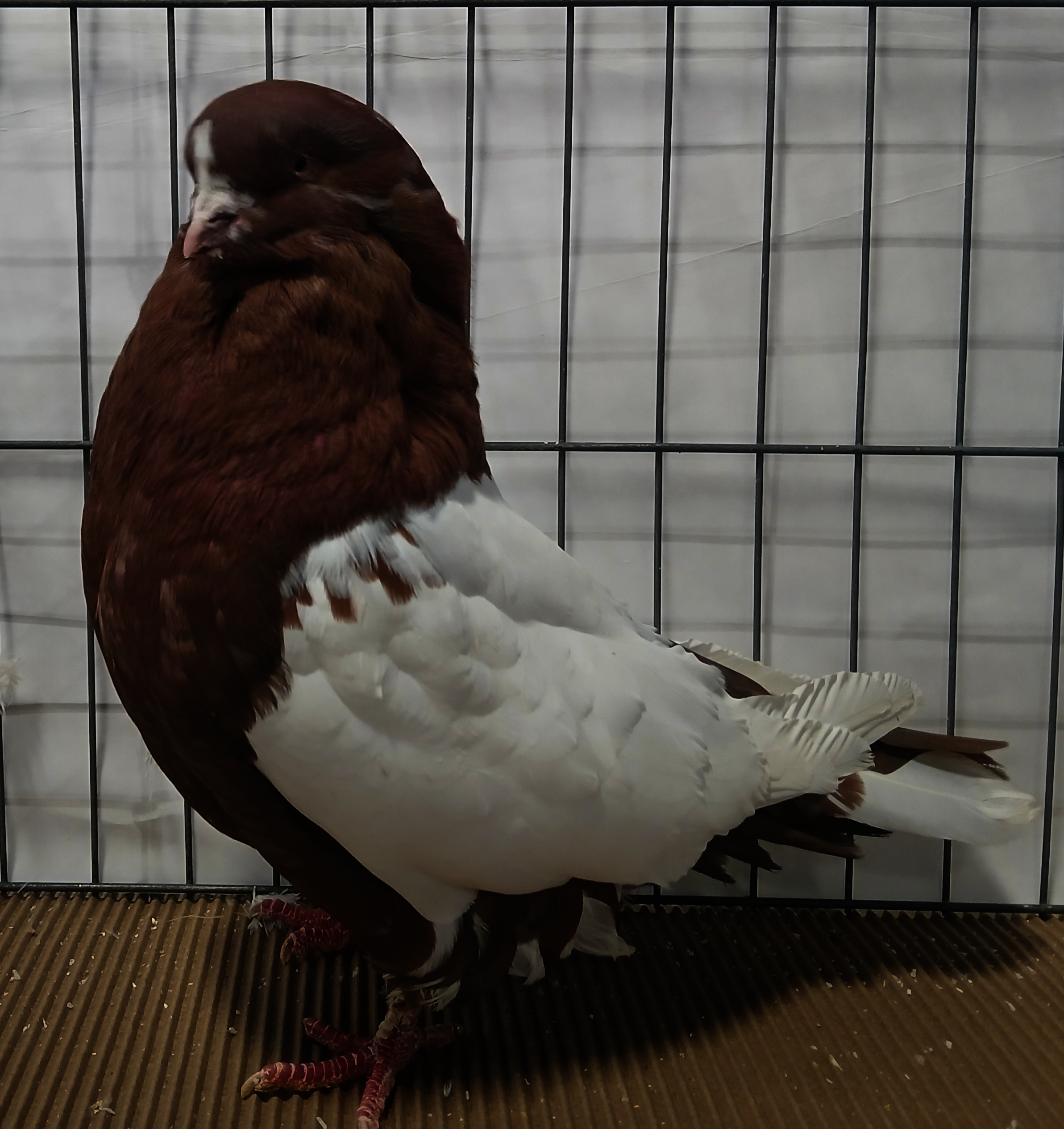
White side

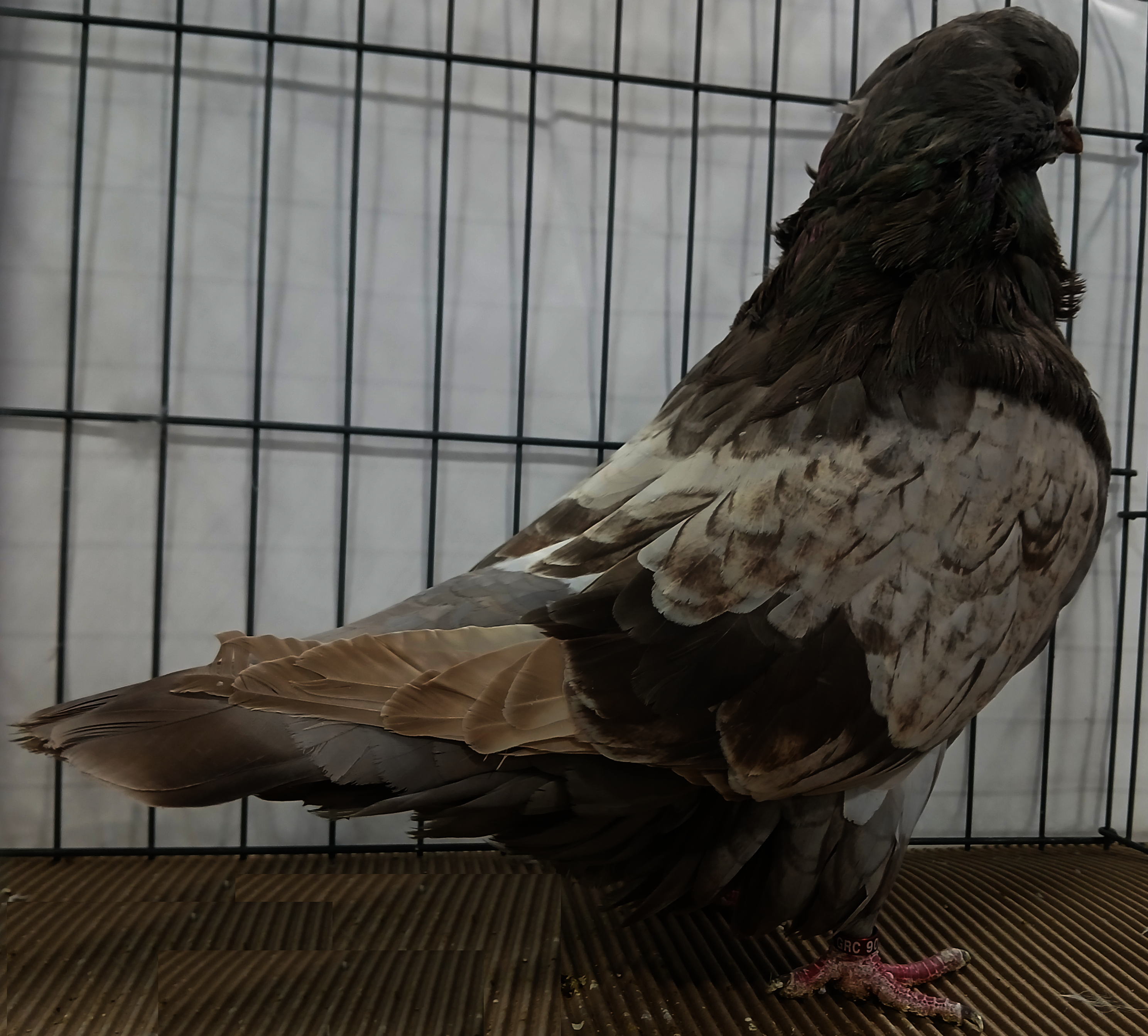
Brown

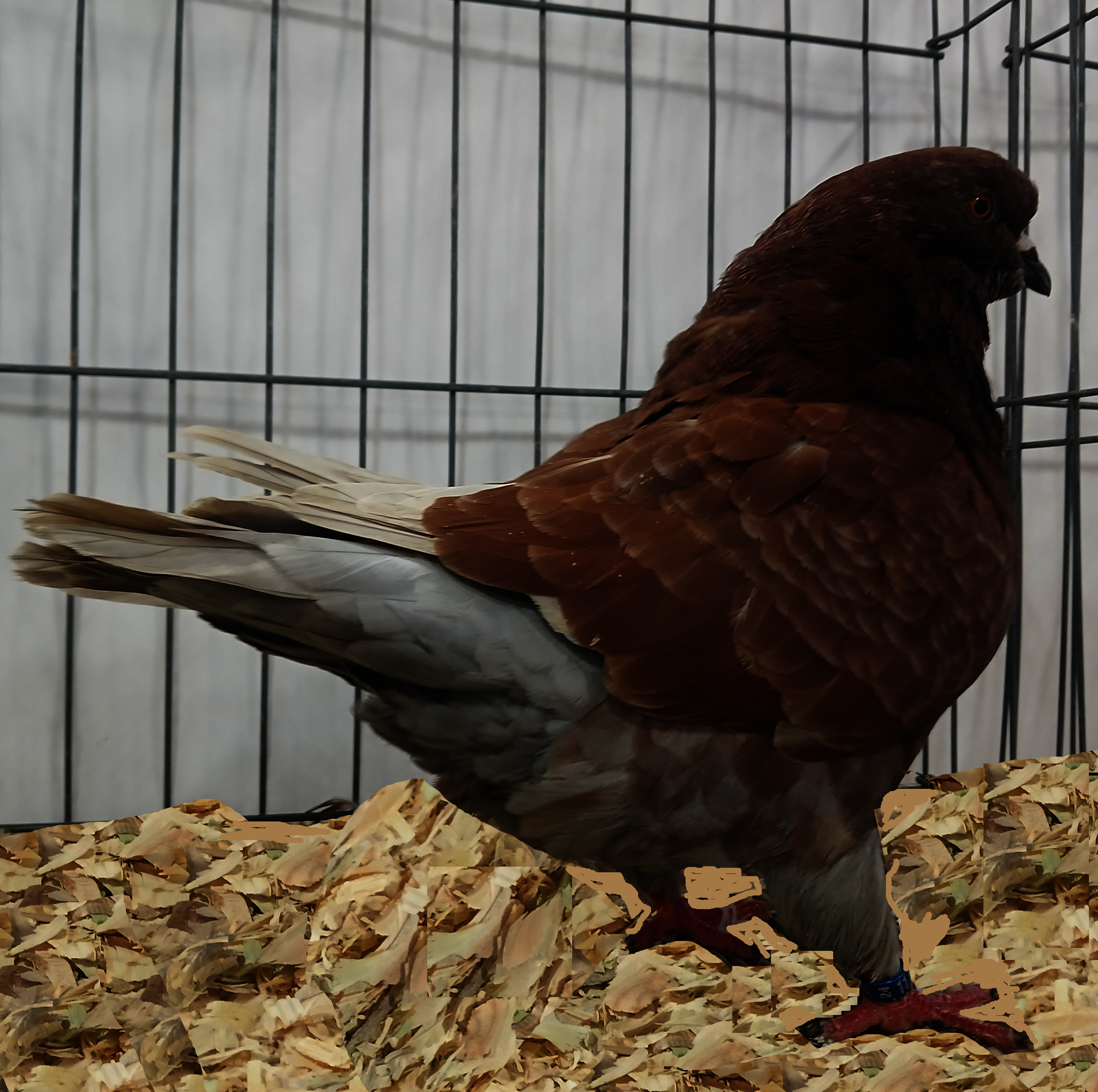
Red check

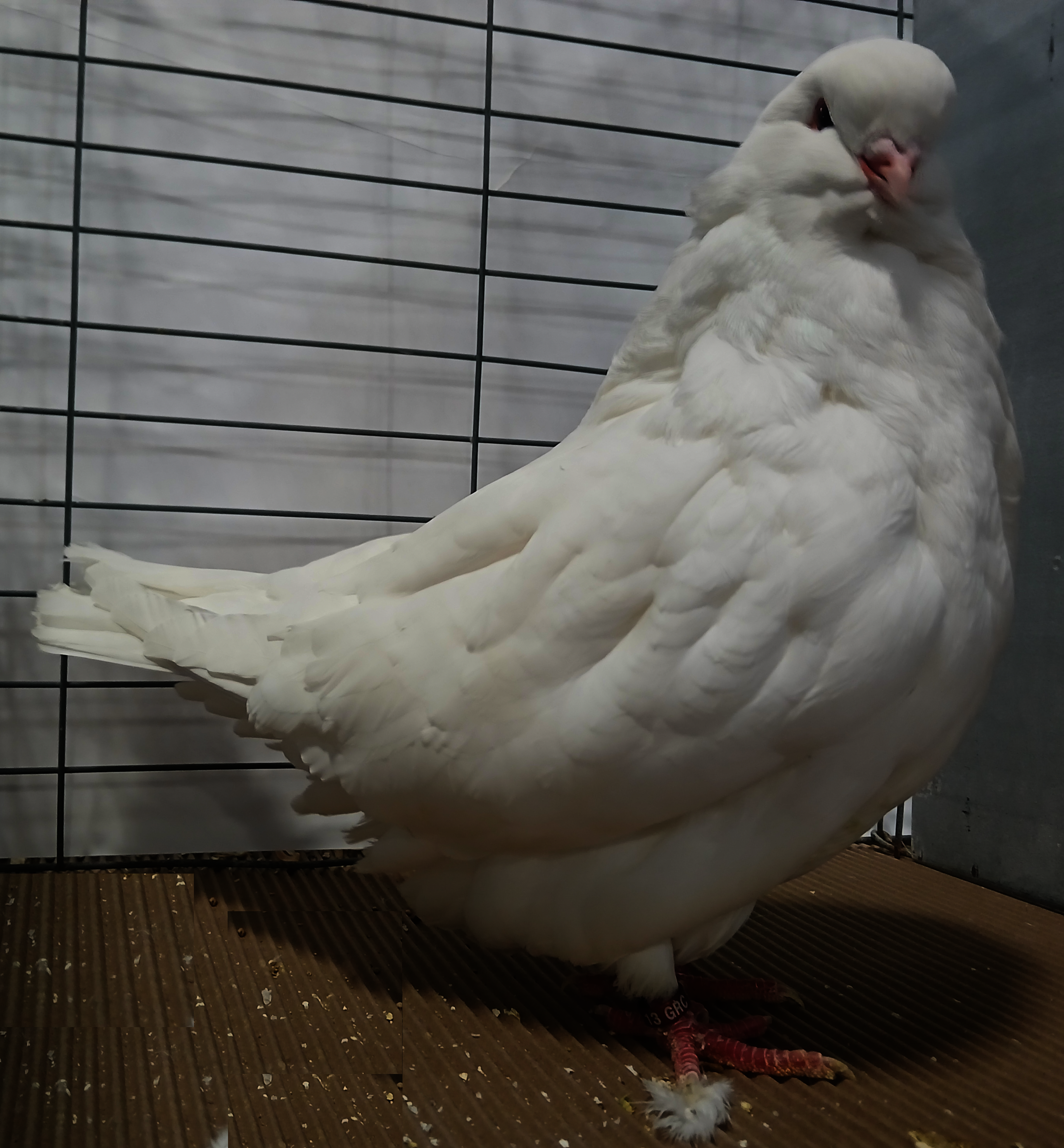
White

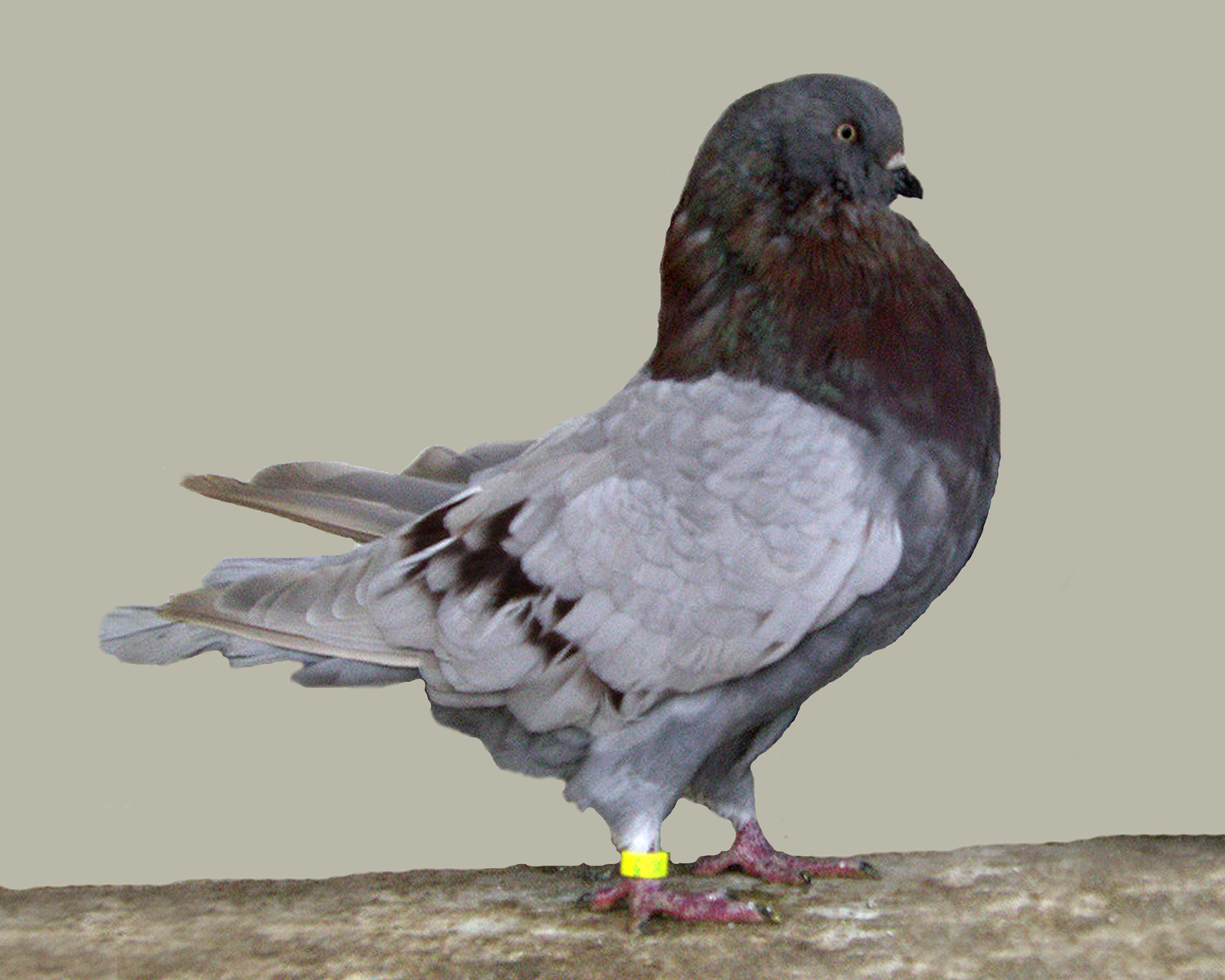
Mealie

== See also ==
- List of pigeon breeds
- Pigeon keeping
  - Pigeon Diet
  - Pigeon Housing
