= Cauchois pigeon =

Breed of pigeon

The Cauchois pigeon is a breed of fancy pigeon. Cauchois pigeons, along with other varieties of domesticated pigeons, are all descendants from the rock pigeon (Columba livia). It was also eaten in France.

== Gallery ==
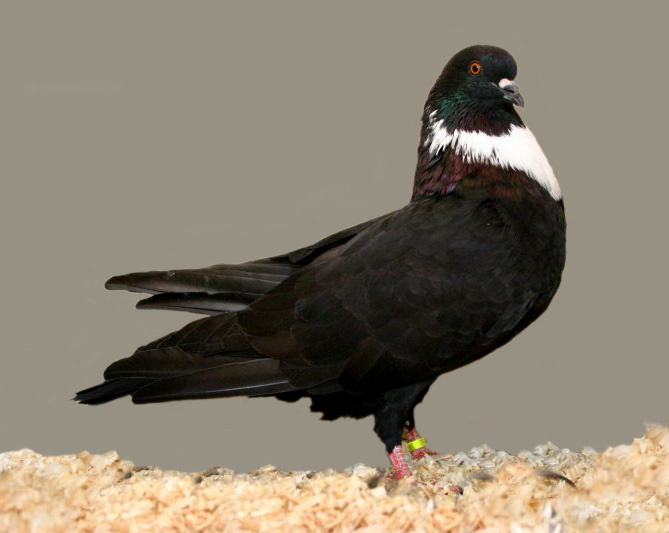
Black self Cauchoi

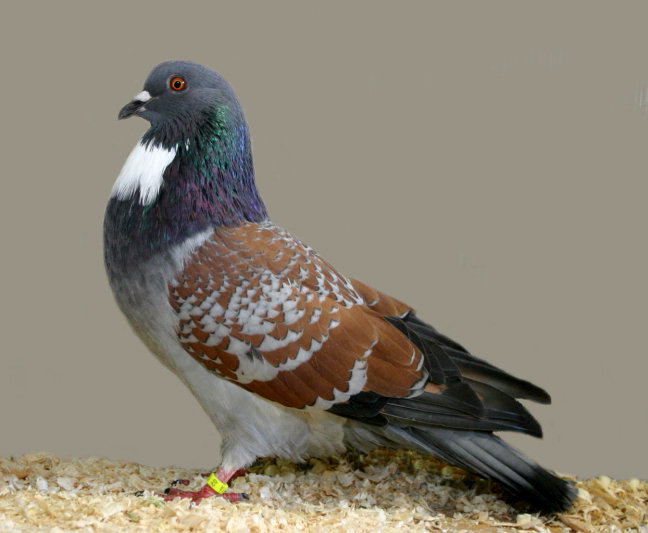
Red laced Caushoi

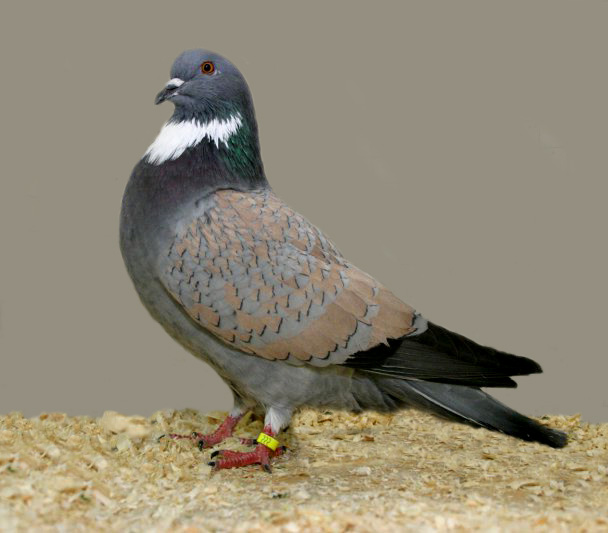
Yellow laced Cauchois

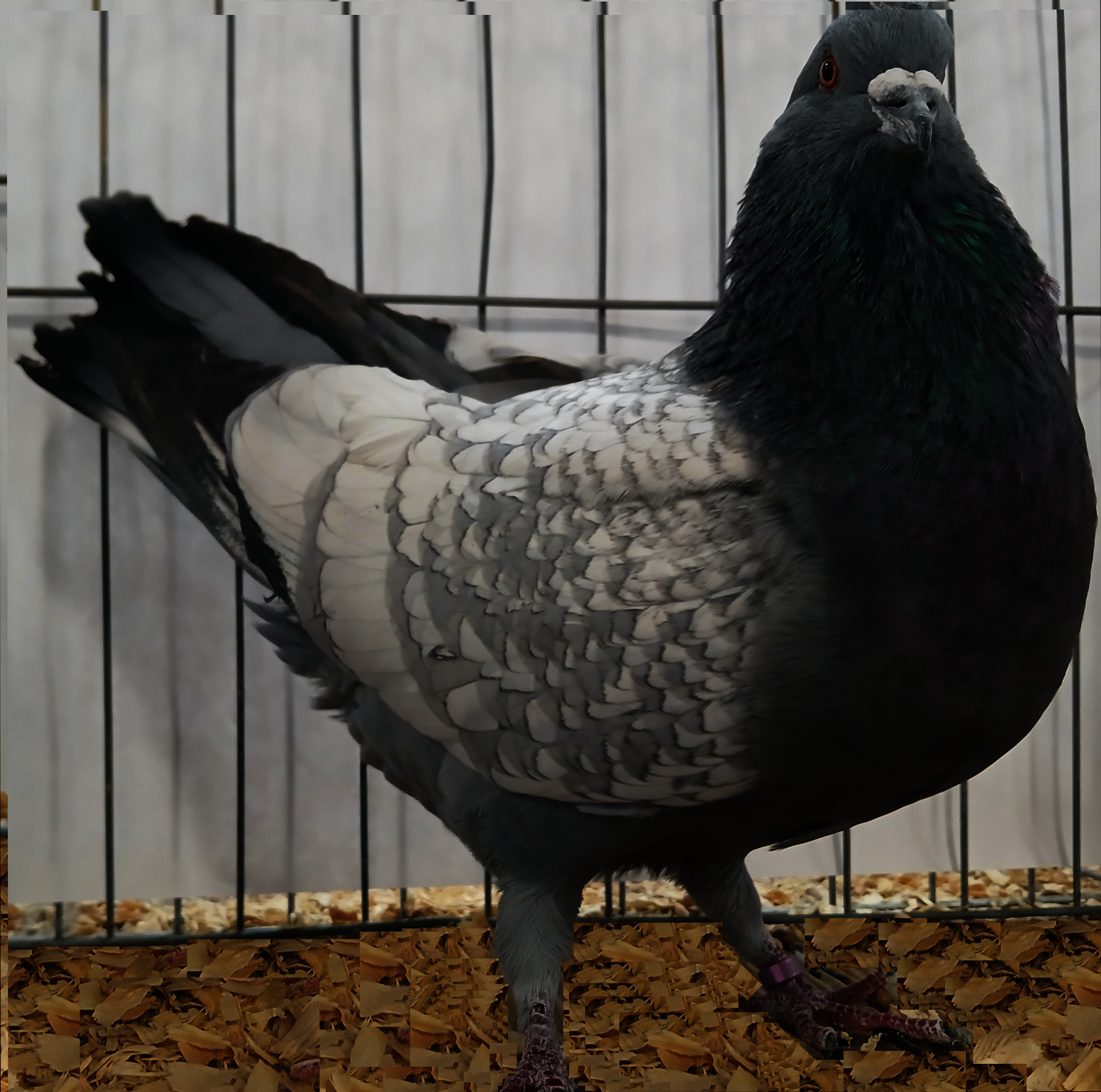
White lace

== See also ==
- Pigeon Diet
- Pigeon Housing
- List of pigeon breeds
