= Chinese Owl pigeon =

Breed of pigeon

Chinese Owl
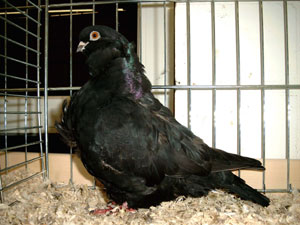
- A black Chinese Owl
- Other names: Whiskered Owl Pigeon
- Country of origin: Debated; possibly Spain or India

Classification
- Australian Breed Group: Frills and Owls
- US Breed Group: Structure pigeons
- EE Breed Group: Structure pigeons

The Chinese Owl is a breed of fancy pigeon developed over many years of selective breeding. The name "Chinese Owl" is a misnomer, as the breed did not originate in China. Its origin is uncertain, but it is speculated that they are probably descended from the Spanish Chorrera breed. Chinese Owls, as with all other varieties of domesticated pigeons, are descendants from the rock pigeon (Columba livia). The breed is known for its small size and profuse frilled feathers. Many specimens have a 'chin-crest' around the front of the neck that does not extend around to the back of the head. The feathers are more 'ruffled' and appear 'wind-swept' rather than 'curled,' as in the frill varieties. The breed comes in many colors: black, brown, blue/blue-grey, barred, ice, satinette, blondinette, white, and pied.

== Gallery ==
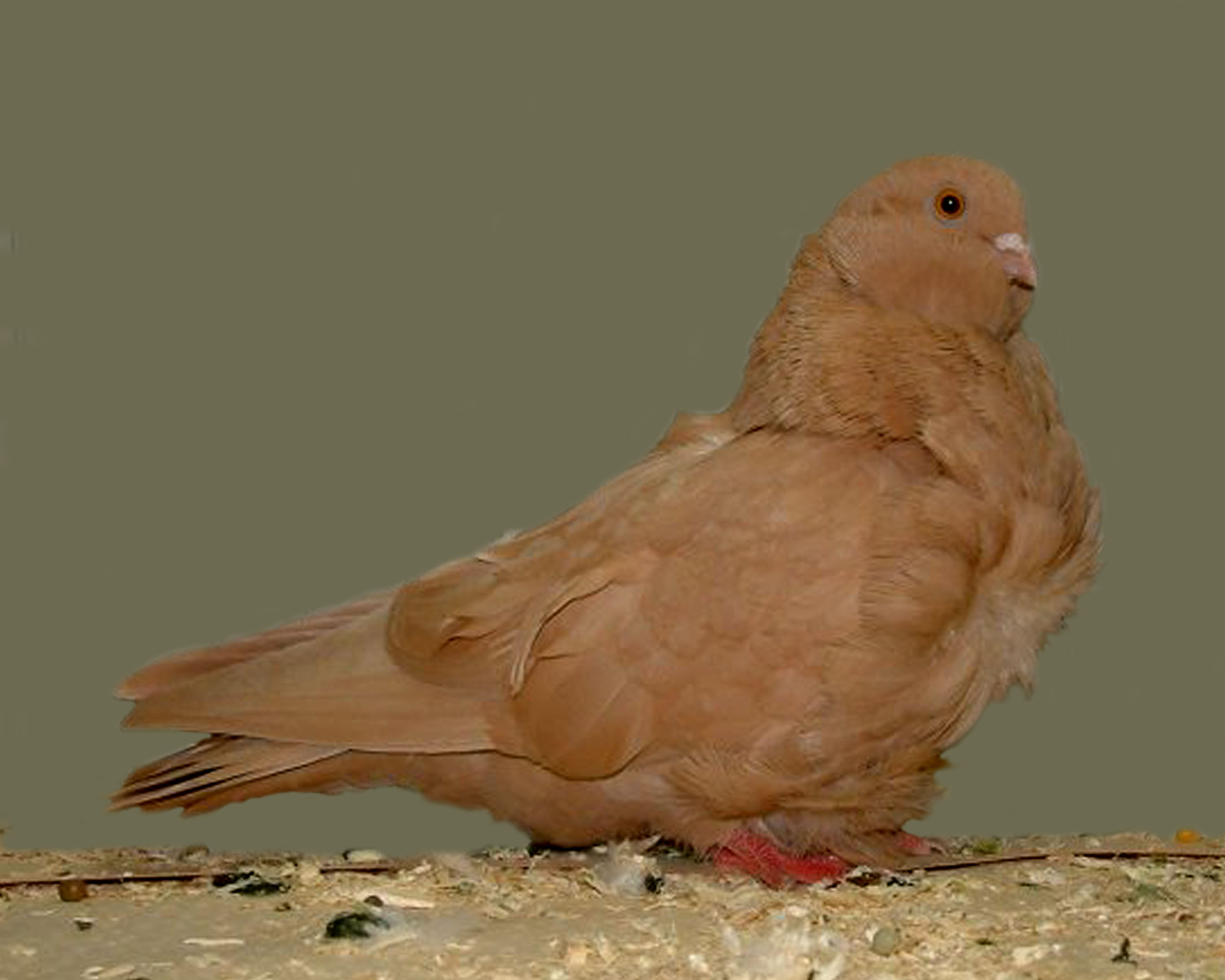
Yellow self

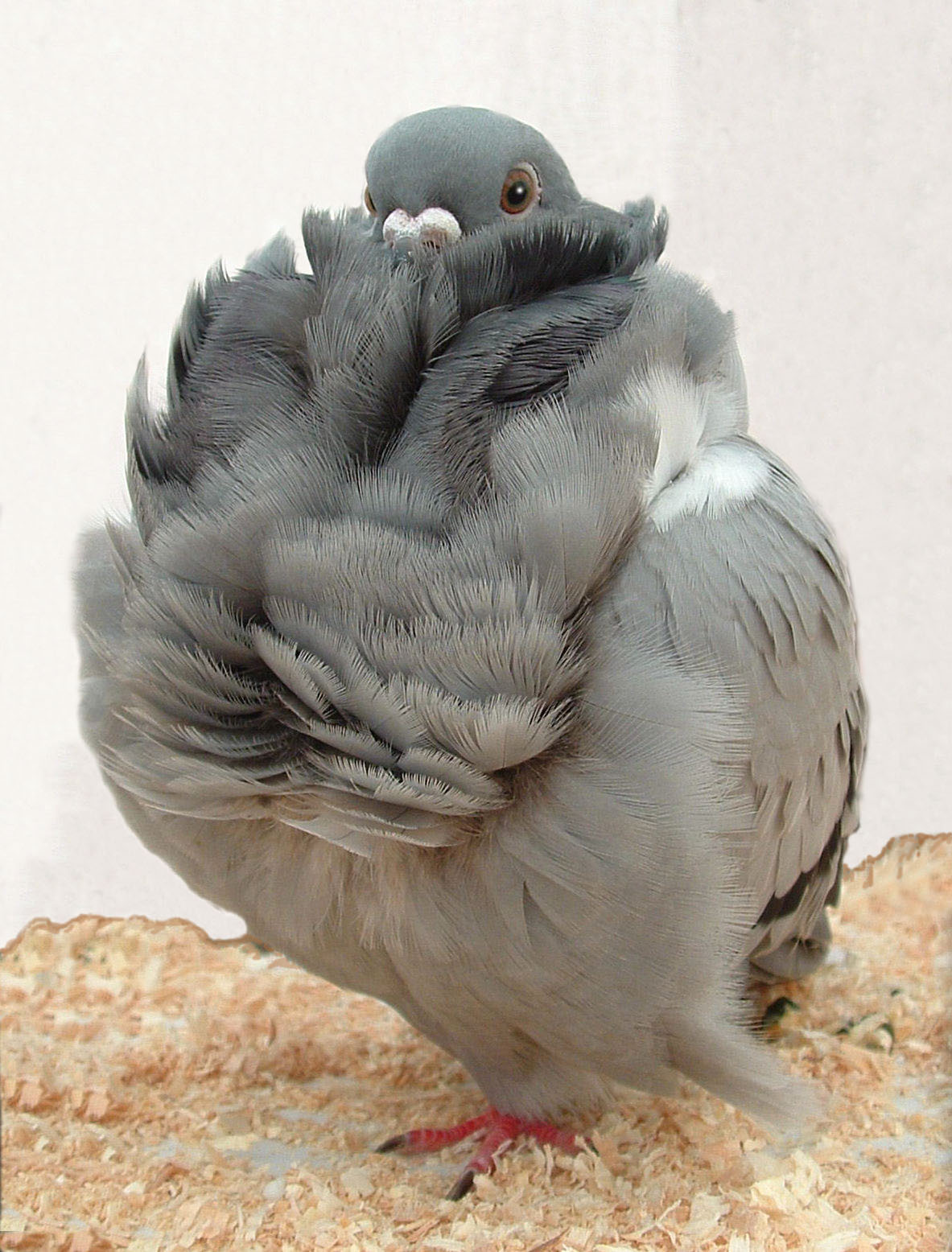
Front view

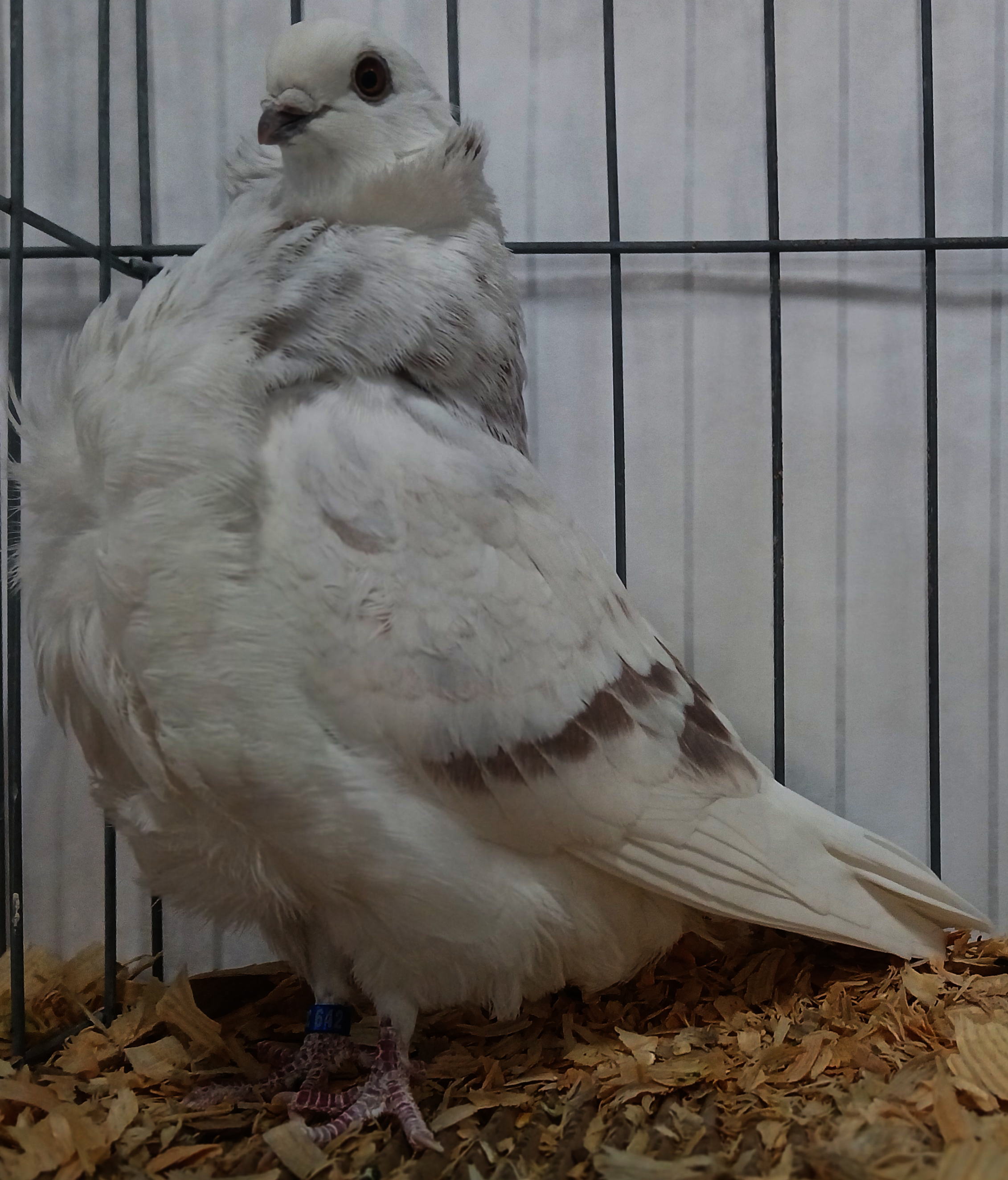
Dilute red bar

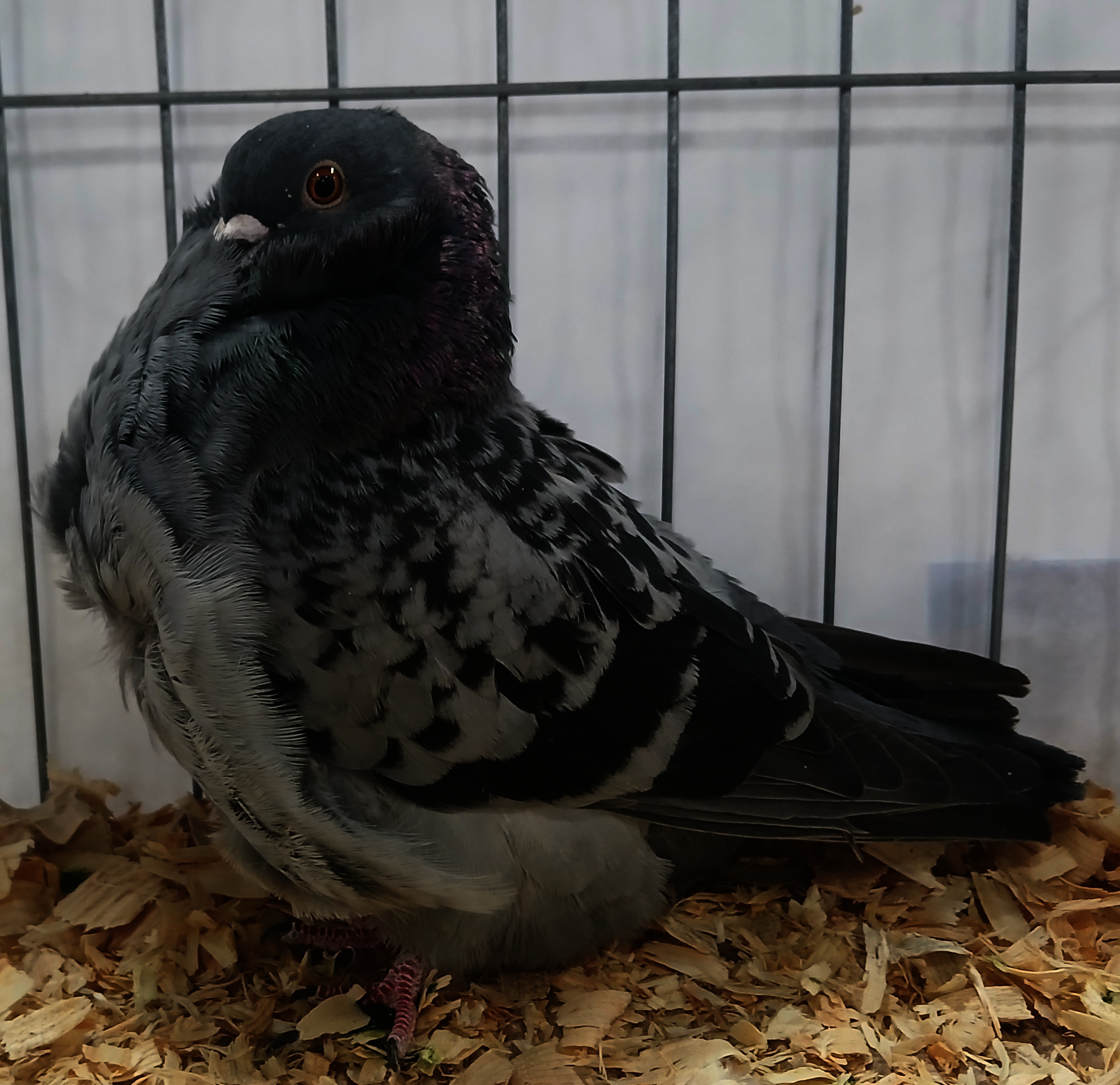
Blue check

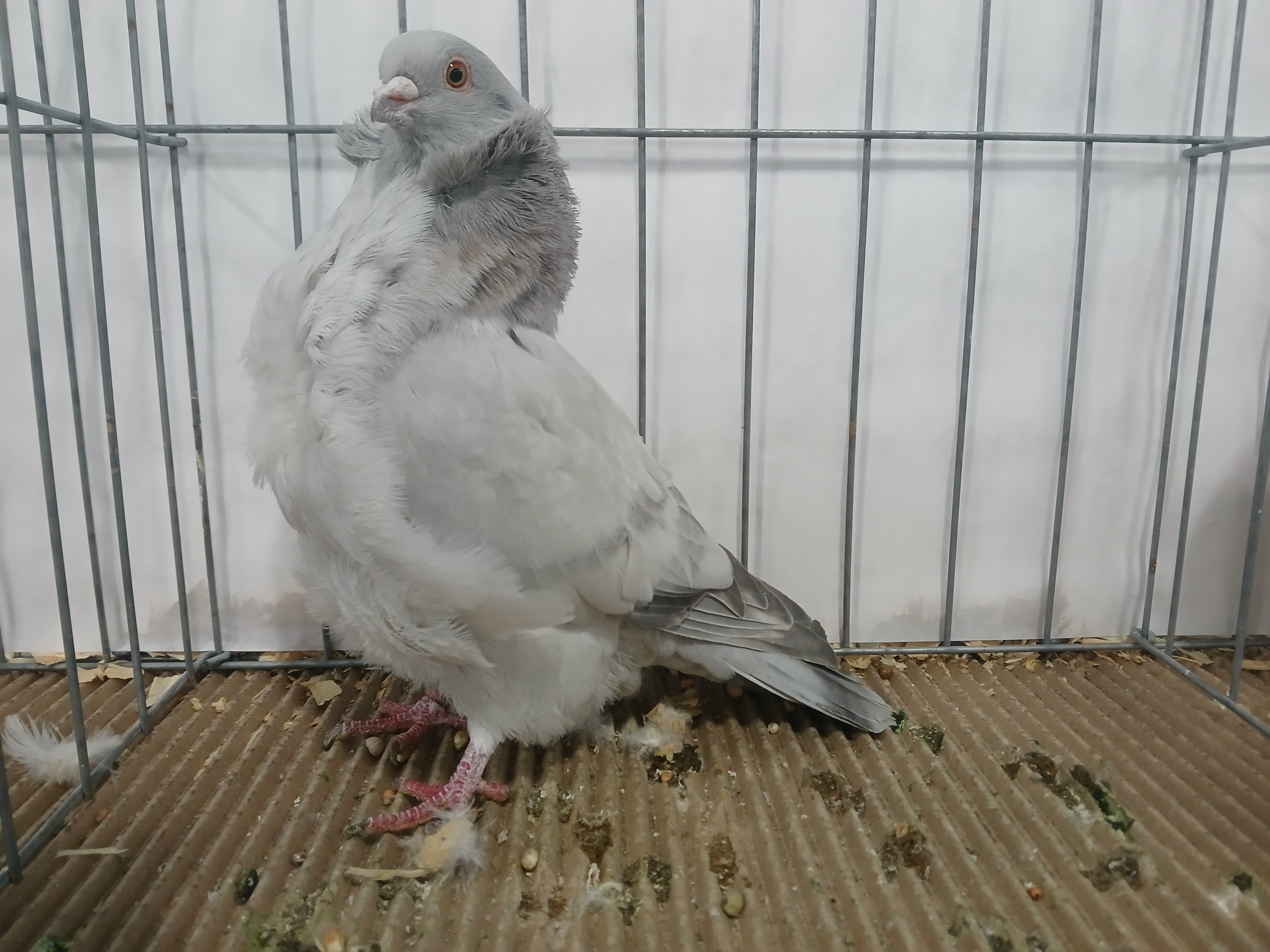
Silver bar

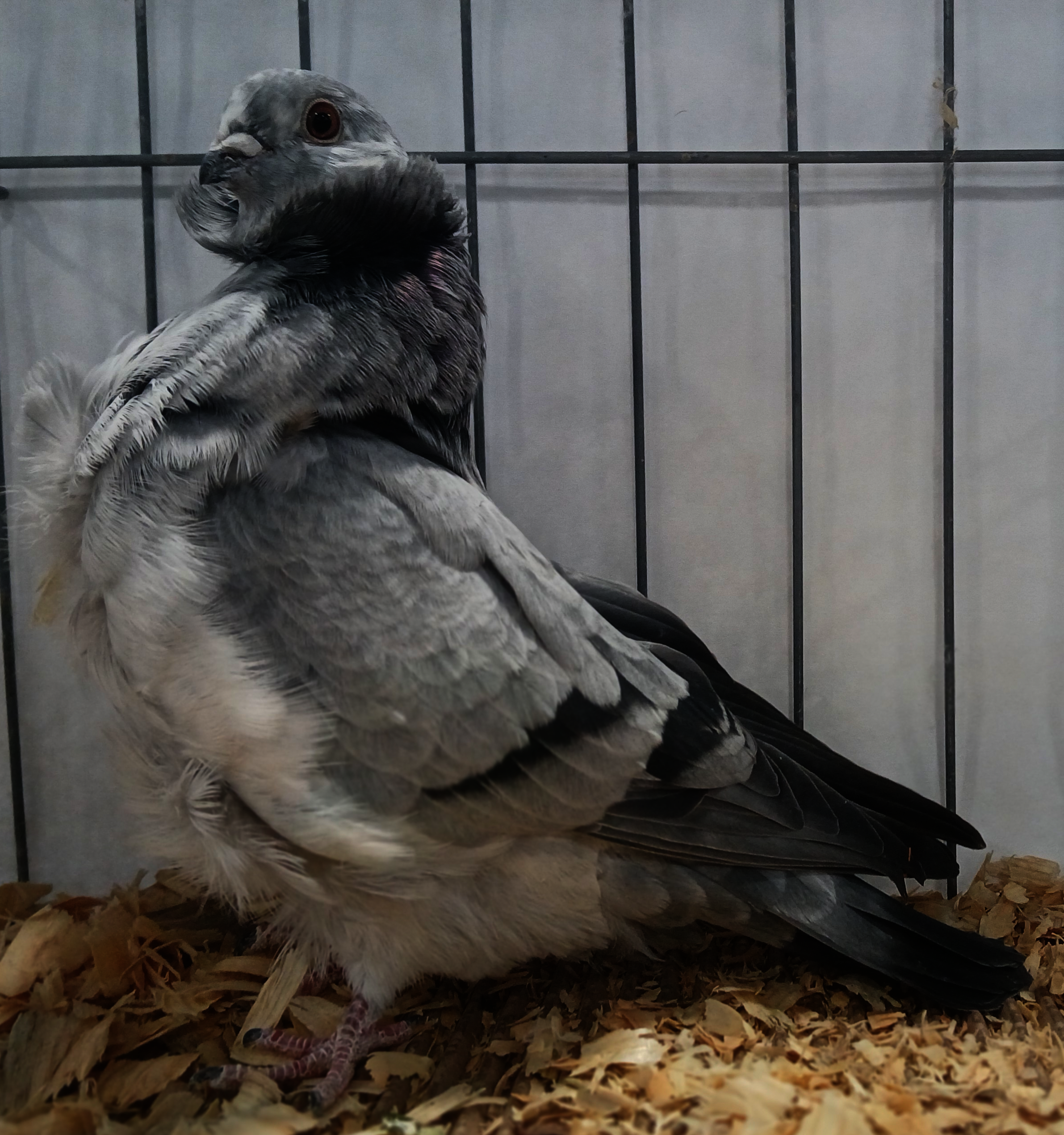
Blue grizzle

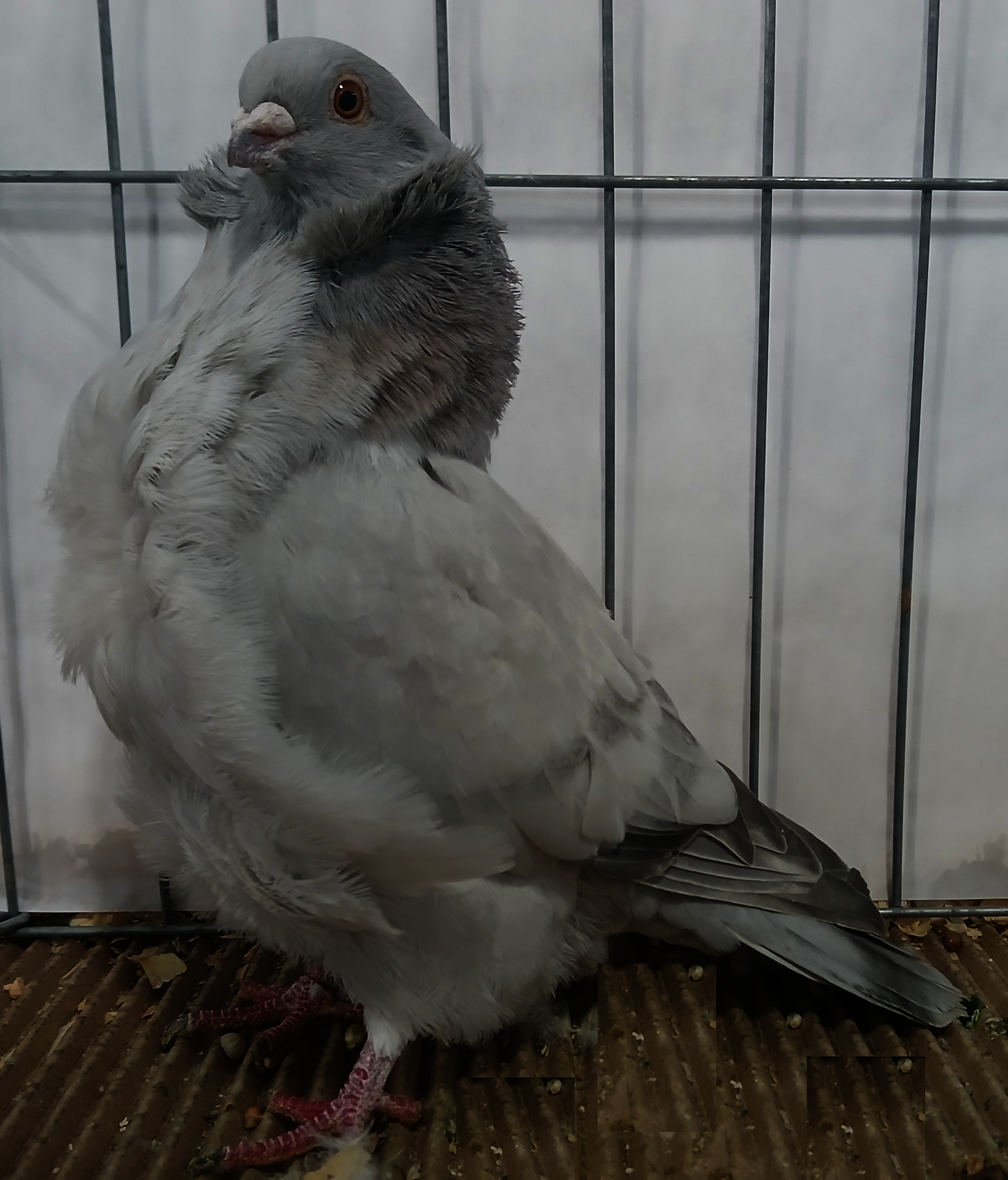

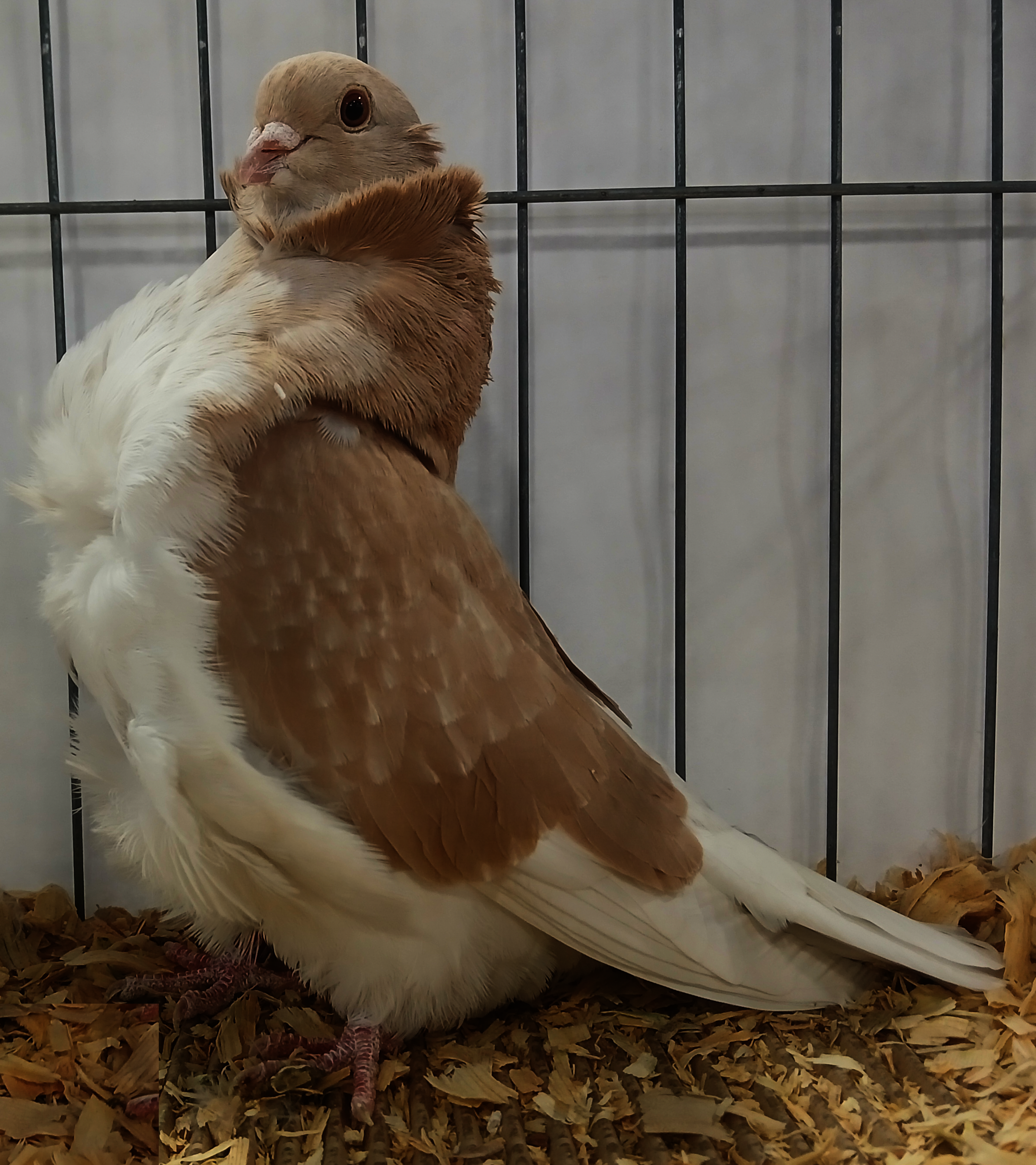
Yellow check

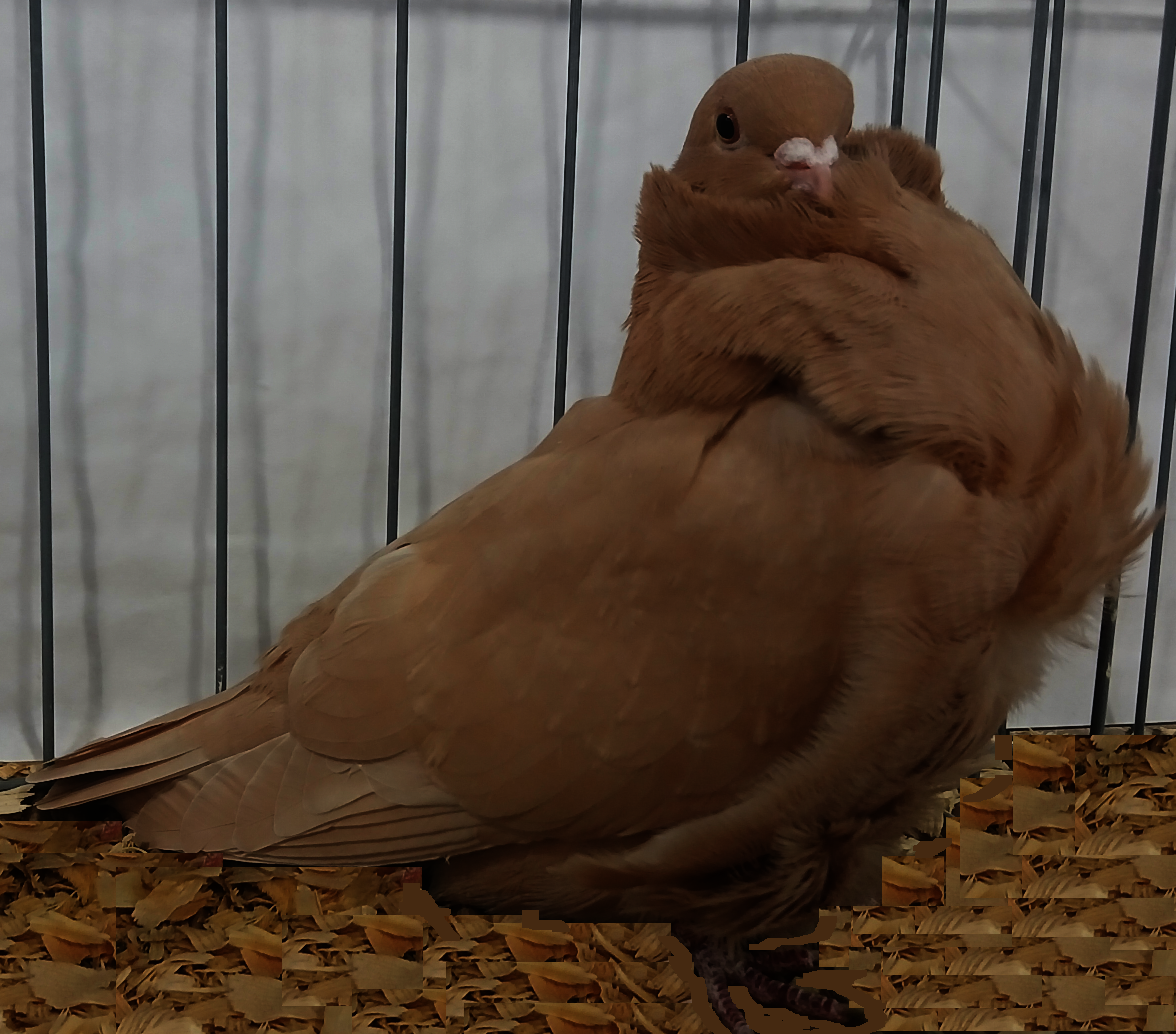
Yellow

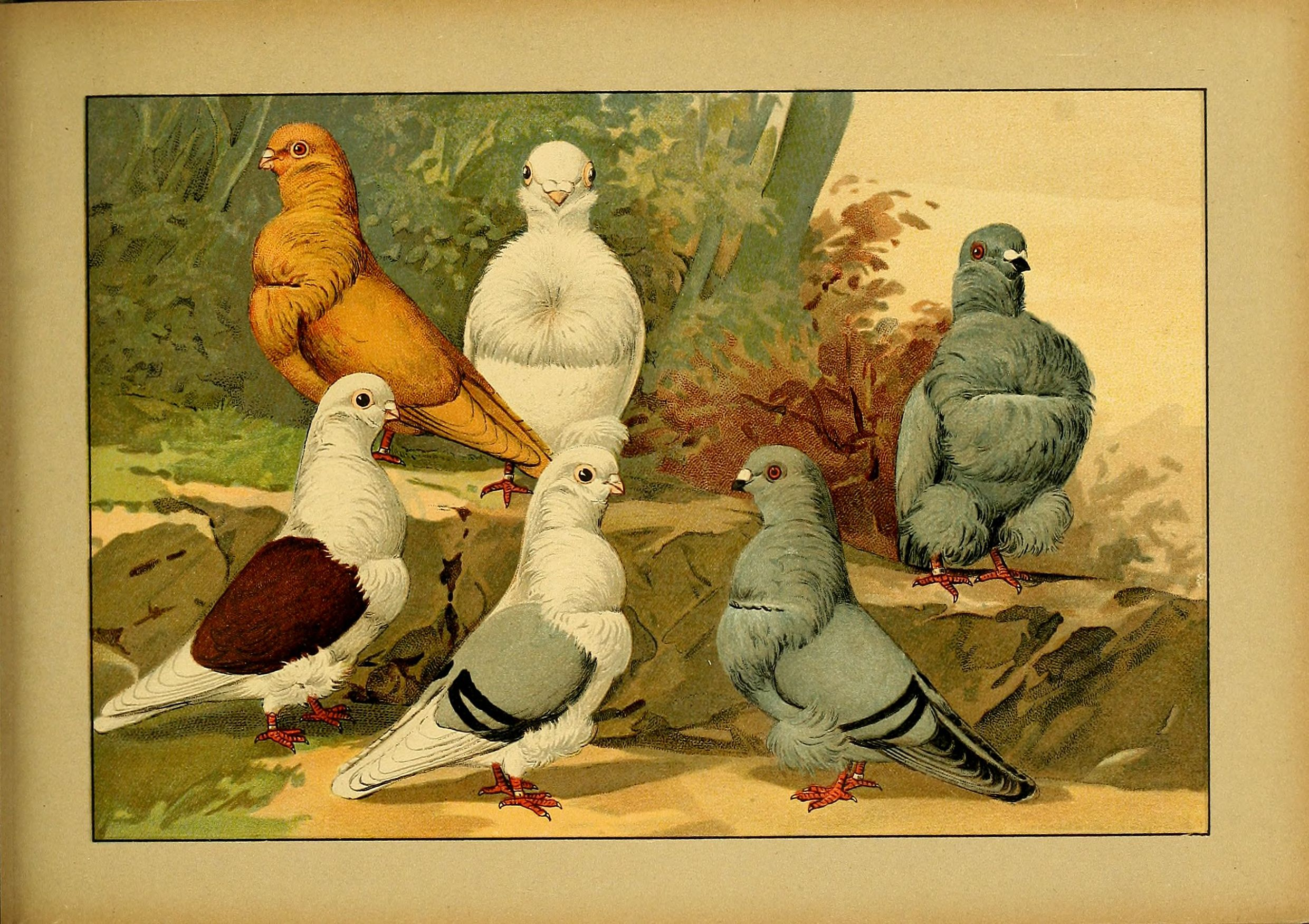
Schachtzabel 1906 Tafel 74

== See also ==
- List of pigeon breeds
- Pigeon diet
- Pigeon housing
- American Pigeon Journal
