= Frillback =

Breed of pigeon

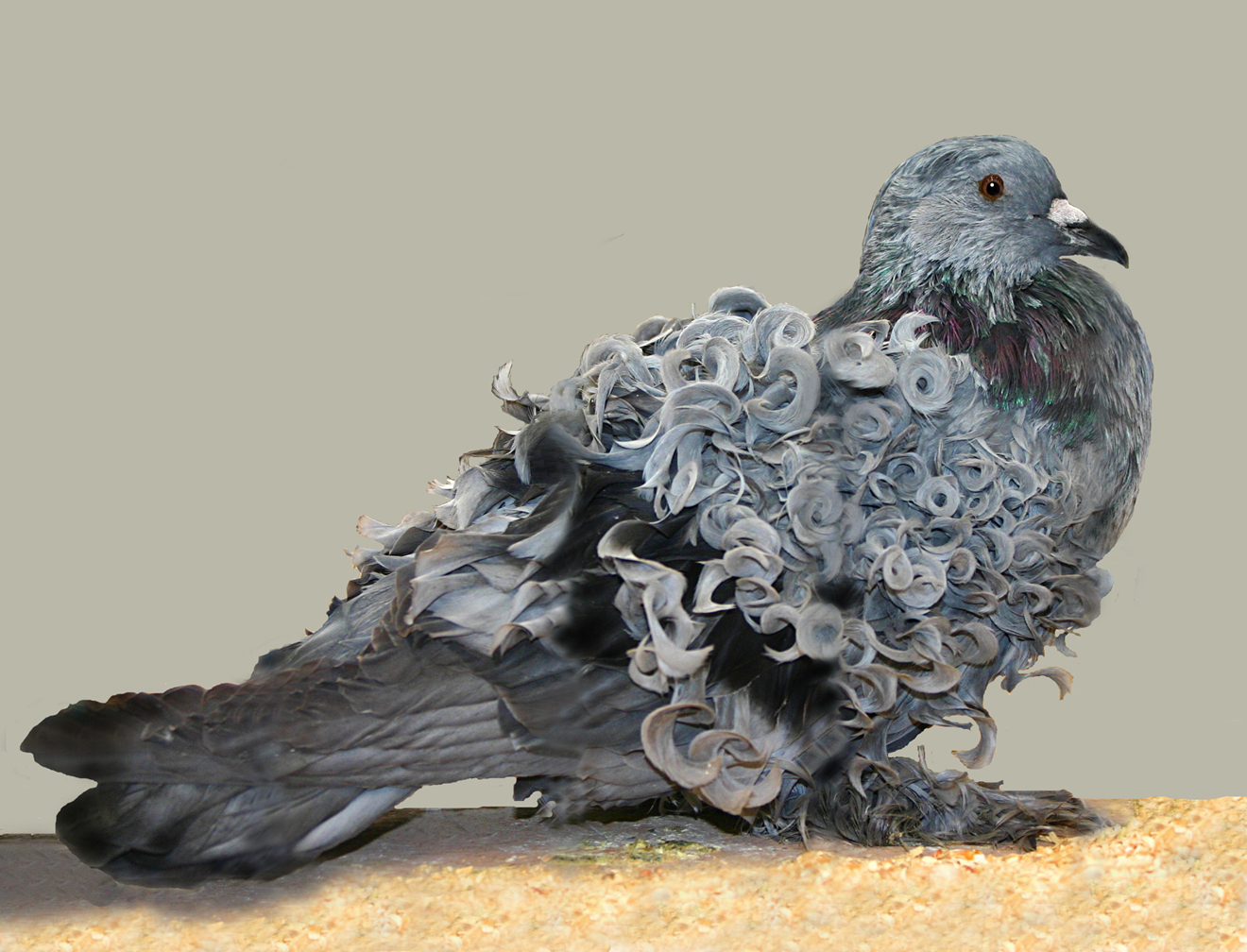
- Blue bar Frillback

Traits
- Feather ornamentation: curled over body

Classification
- Australian Breed Group: Asian feather and voice pigeons
- US Breed Group: Fancy pigeons
- EE Breed Group: Structure pigeons

Notes
- A breed of pigeon which is very far removed from its wild ancestor with its curly feathers

The Frillback is a breed of pigeon developed over many years of selective breeding. Frillbacks, along with other varieties of domesticated pigeons, are all descendants from the rock pigeon (Columba livia). The breed is known for the frill or curls on the wing shield feathers. The feather curl should also be present at the ends of the foot feathers or muffs.

== History ==
The exact origin of the breed is not definitely known. It is an ancient breed that reaches far back in history and is said to have originated in several different regions. It is generally conceded that the breed arrived from the Orient via the ports of Palestine, Arabia, Syria and Persia. They were known in England as early as 1735, and are briefly mentioned In John Moore's Treatise on Domestic Pigeons.They arrived in the U.S. around 1900. Historically they have generally been colored black or white, from the Netherlands and France, while the blue and red varieties were developed in Austria-Hungary.

== The standards of a pure American Frillback ==
The quality of a Frillback is based on a 100-point scale, with the head constituting 15 points, the color constituting 15 points, the body constituting 10 points, the curl constituting 50 points, and the muff constituting 10 points.

The colors of standard Frillbacks fall into six color categories.

1. Self – white, black, recessive red, yellow
2. Pattern – recessive red mottle, yellow mottle, rosewing, whiteside
3. Grizzle – red, yellow, blue, silver
4. Shield marked – red, yellow, blue-black bar, silver-dun bar, mealy ash-red bar, ash-cream bar
5. ARC – Any rare color
6. ARCP – Any rare color pattern

ARC and ARCP Frillbacks must be entered by at least 3 exhibitors in 3 of 5 American Frillback shows for 3 years, with judging score progress, before it is deemed appropriate. Frillbacks produce many different colors that are not recognized by the AFC because they are not standard and do not reproduce consistently. Frillbacks can carry numerous colors in many different patterns such as pied. These colors are not recognized as standard but are very common.

Size

Frillbacks are slightly larger than other colored pigeon breeds, with long tail and wing feathers.

Head

Shell-crest and plain-head are found in all colors of Frillbacks. A plain-headed Frillback should have a slightly oval head with no flat areas and a forehead that has a distinct stop at the wattle. A shell-crested Frillback should have a thick shell crest on the back of the head with rosettes on each side. The crest should stand off the head.

Eyes

The eyes should be in line with the beak. A reddish-orange is desired in all colors except shield marked. Shield marked desire a black or "bull-eye". While pearl, gravel, and cracked eyes occur, they are not desirable and are considered major faults.

Beak

The beak of a Frillback is long, with the upper beak often being slightly longer than the lower beak. The beak is dark on red and blue grizzles, black on blacks, light on yellow, horn on silver, and flesh colored on all other standard colors. The wattle is thin and white on all colors.

Muff

The muff of a Frillback will vary, however, 2 to 3 inches is a desirable length.

Frill

The curl of a Frillback covers its entire wing shield. No areas should be uncovered. The last row of curls spans the entire length of the wing. Frills form a distinct ringlet curl at the end. The bottom of the muff is also frilled. Tail and flight feathers have a distinct wrinkle.

== Gallery ==
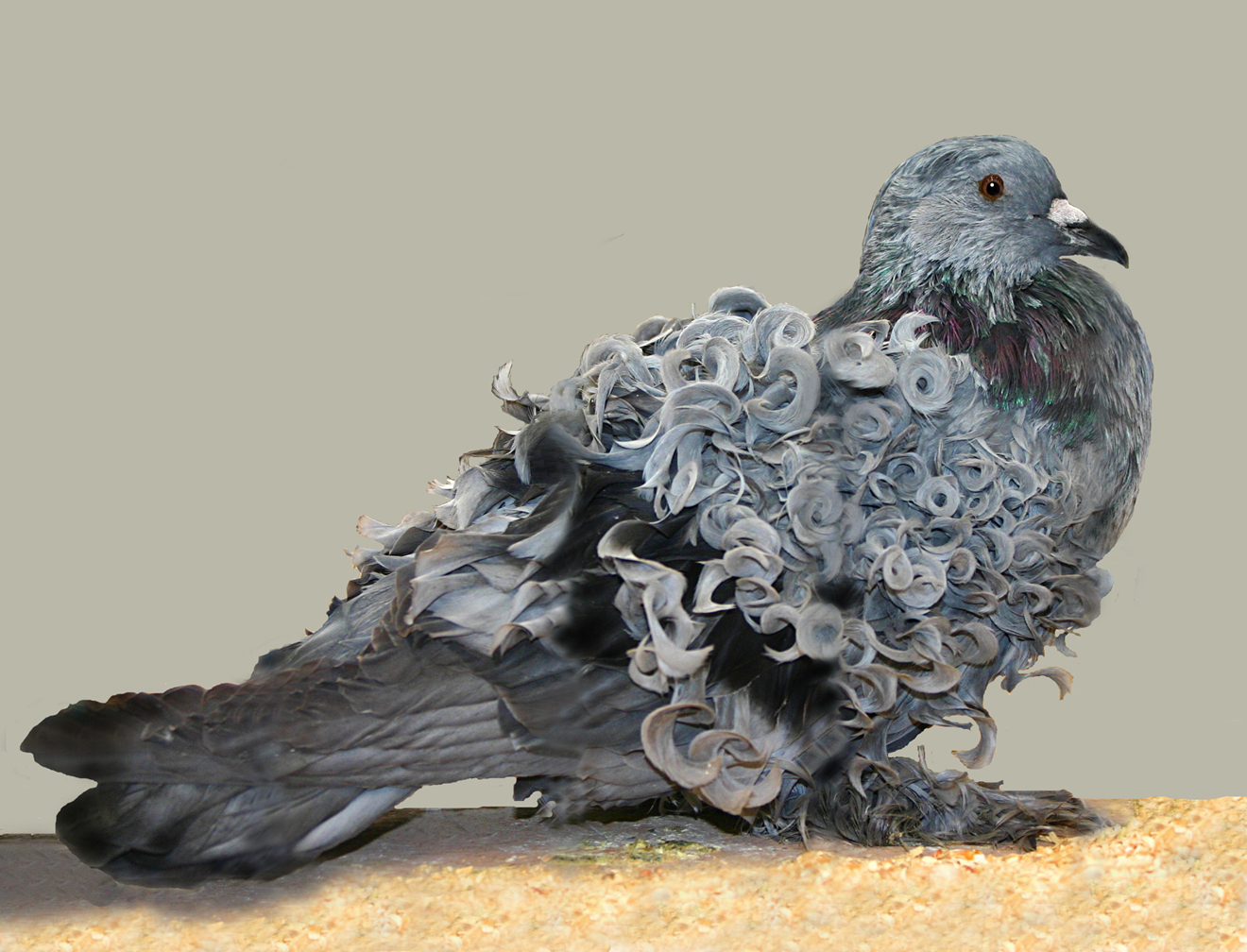
Blue bar Frillback

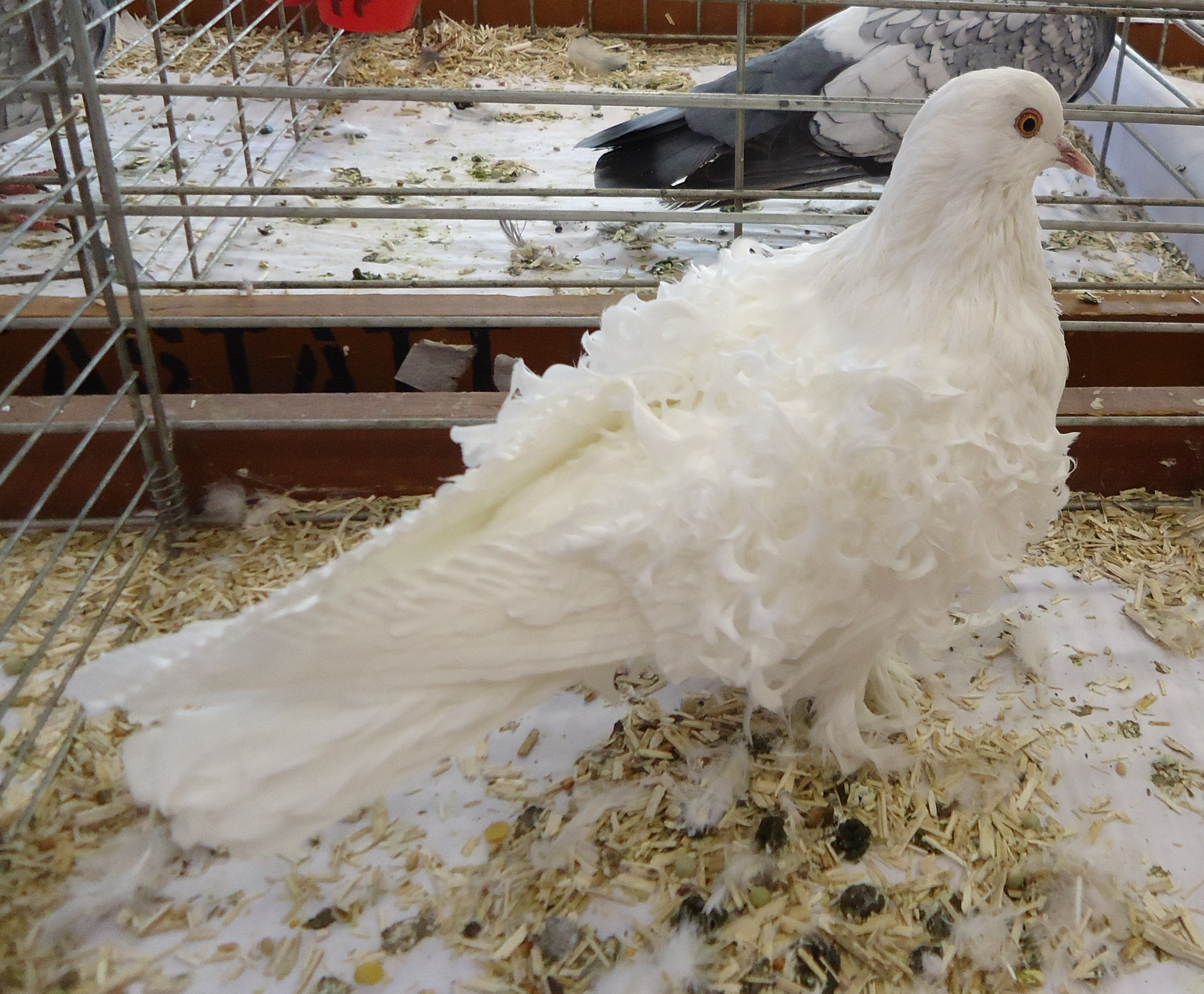
White Frillback

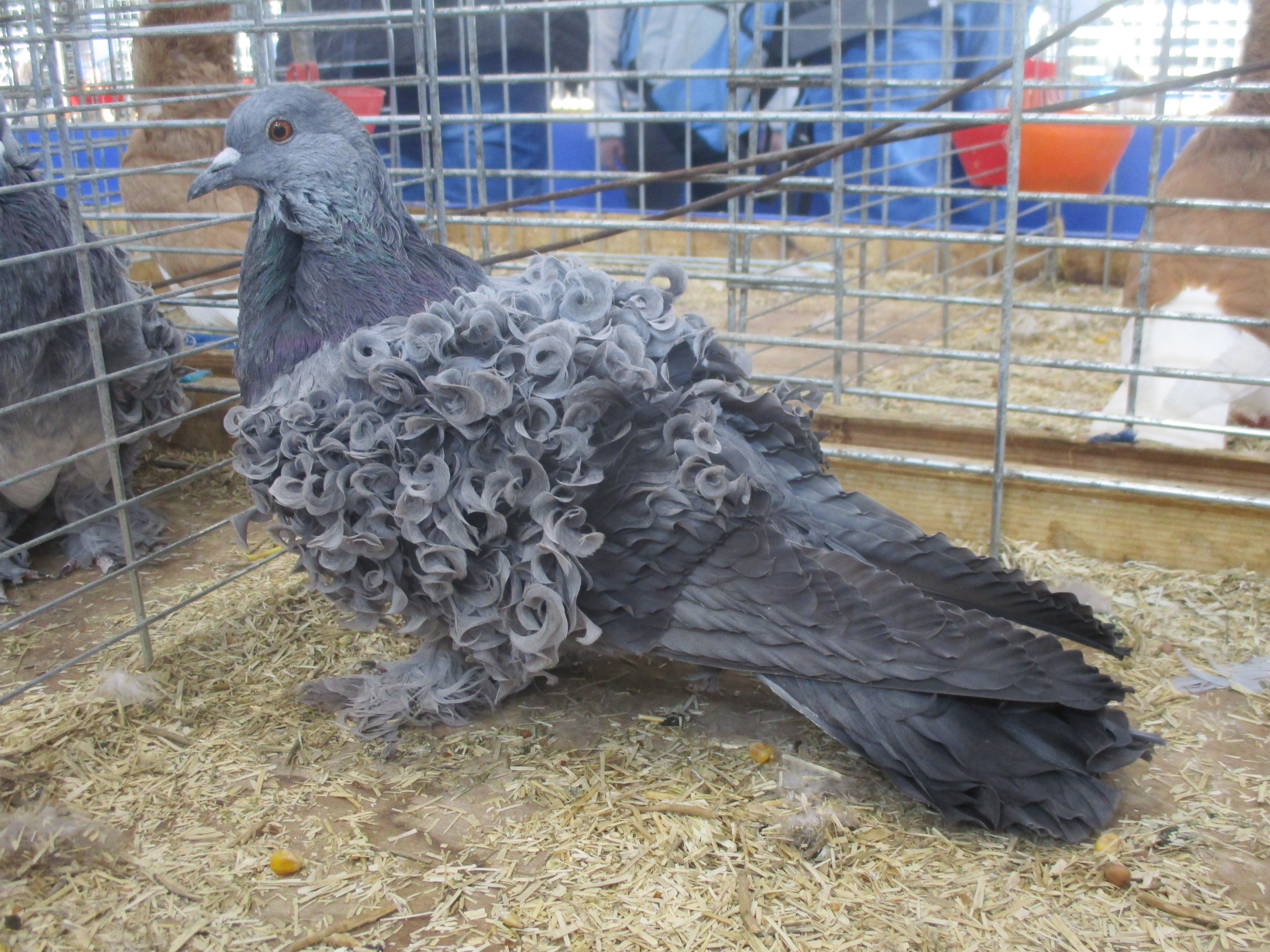
Gray Frillback

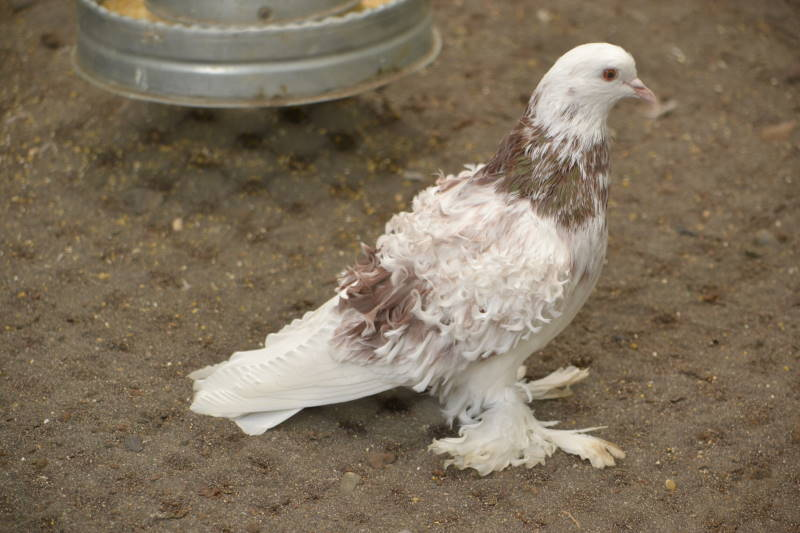
Red bar Frillback

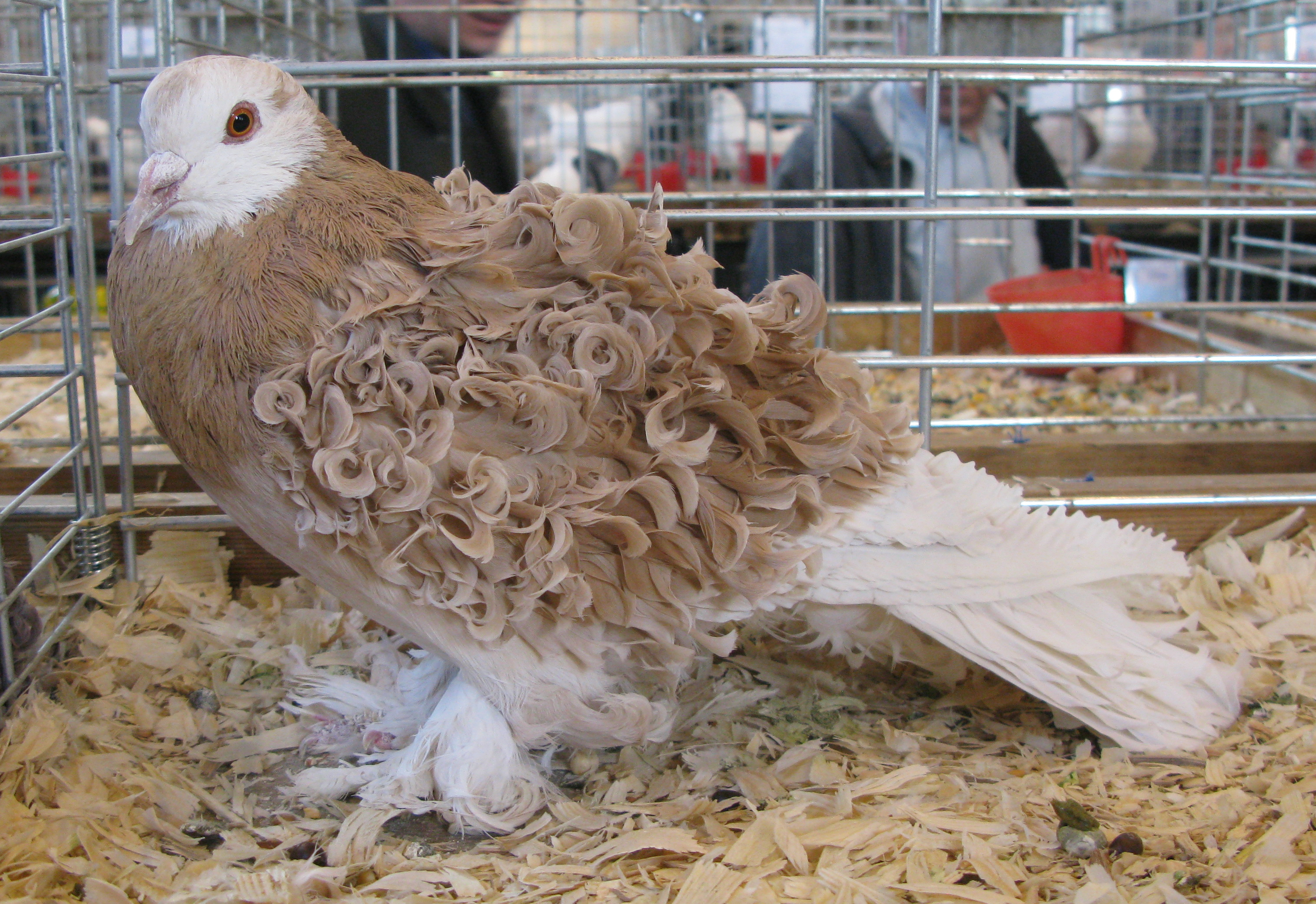
Red Frillback

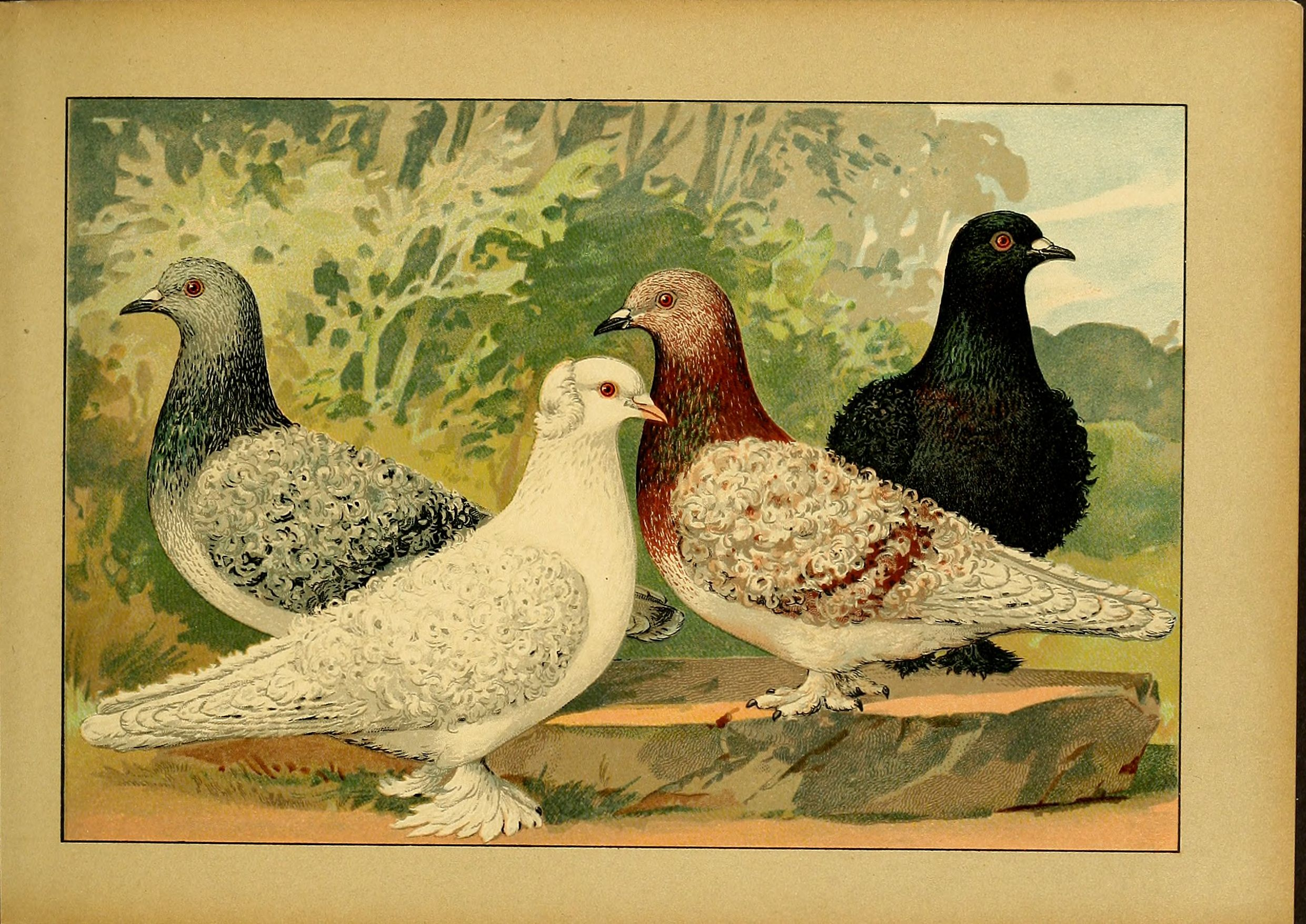
Schachtzabel 1906 Tafel 25

== See also ==
- Pigeon Diet
- Pigeon Housing
- List of pigeon breeds
