= Prishtina Roller =

Breed of pigeon

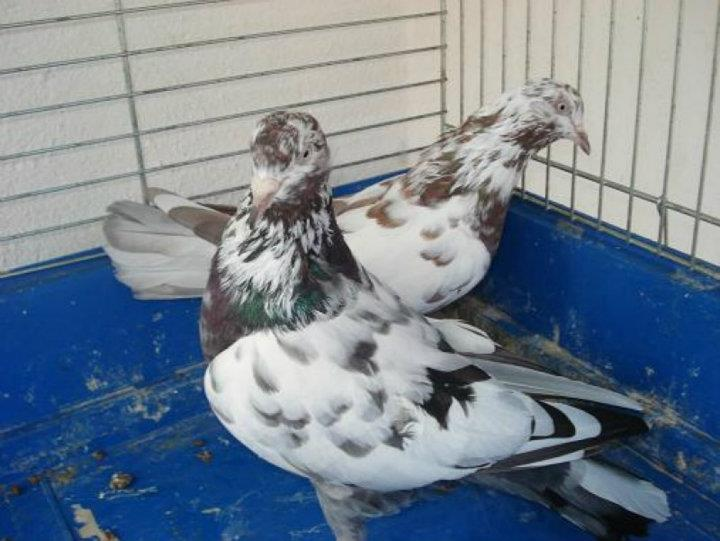
Prishtina Roller

Prishtina Roller (Akrobatiku i Prishtinës) is a specific and particular breed of pigeons from Kosovo, whose origins date from 19th and the beginning of 20th century.

Because of the long tradition of breeding (more than a hundred years), this breed is also known by several other names: Prishtina Donek – Doneku i Prishtinës, Kosova Donek – Doneku i Kosovës, Prishtina Tumbler, etc. In the process of creating the 'Prishtina Roller' breed, the donek breed was a favourite and from this has developed the 'Prishtina Roller' which takes its name from Pristina (Prishtina), the capital of Kosovo, where it has a breed standard and is registered as a breed there with the Federal Commission.

== See also ==
- Donek
- List of pigeon breeds
