= Donek =

Breed of pigeon

Dönek
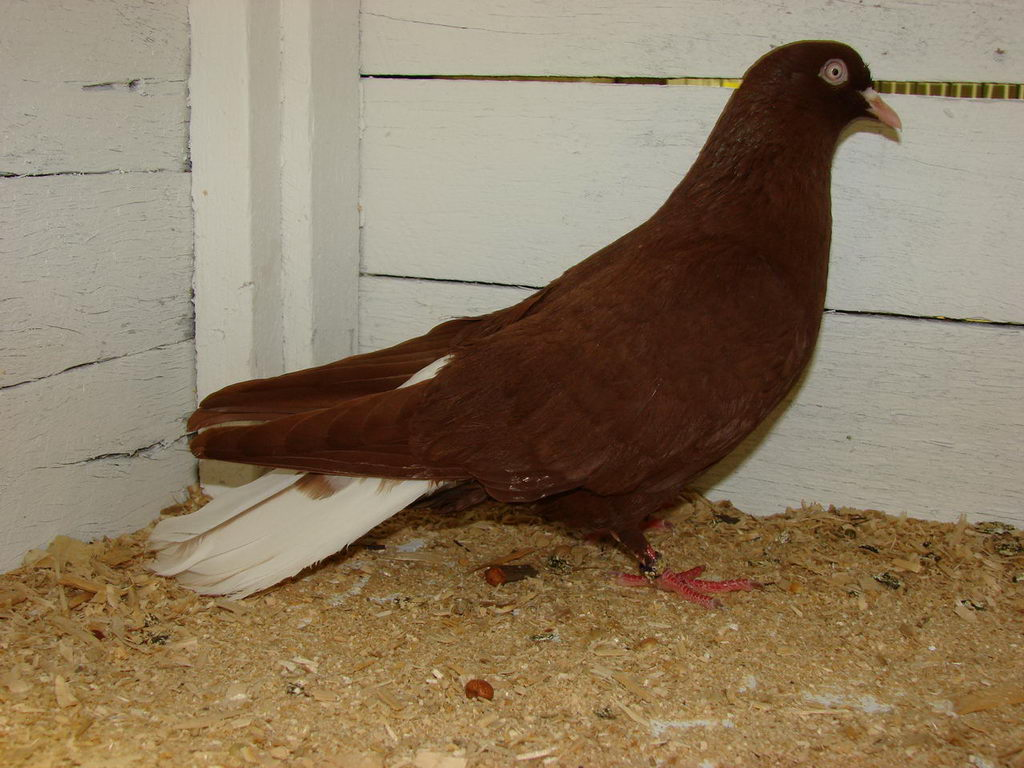
- Self red Alina
- Conservation status: Common
- Country of origin: North Macedonia

Classification
- US Breed Group: Flying

Notes
- A flying breed with a very distinctive aerial performance.

The Dönek is a Turkish breed of fancy pigeon developed over many years of selective breeding. The name Donek is of Turkish origin and means "turning and dropping down from the sky". These breeds are found around the world and in former Ottoman states like Greece and Macedonia. The Alina, along with other varieties of domesticated pigeons, are all descendants from the rock pigeon (Columba livia). The breed is known for its aerial acrobatics (spiral diving) and as such is more of a performance breed rather than a purely fancy variety. Their aerial spiraling return when called back to the loft makes a spectacular sight.

== See also ==
- List of pigeon breeds
